= List of spaceflight launches in January–June 2019 =

This article lists orbital and suborbital launches during the first half of the year 2019.

For all other spaceflight activities, see 2019 in spaceflight. For launches in the second half of 2019 see List of spaceflight launches in July–December 2019.

== Orbital launches ==
- ← Jan
- Feb
- Mar
- Apr
- May
- Jun
- Jul
- Aug
- Sep
- Oct
- Nov
- Dec →

Date and time (UTC)	Rocket	Flight number	Launch site		LSP	
Date and time (UTC)	Payload (⚀ = CubeSat)	Operator	Orbit	Function	Decay (UTC)	Outcome
Date and time (UTC)	Remarks					
=== January ===
10 January; 17:05	(China) Long March 3B/E	3B-Y56	(China) Xichang LC-2		(China) CASC	
10 January; 17:05	(China) Chinasat 2D	CNSA	Geosynchronous	Communications	In orbit	Operational
11 January; 15:31	(United States) Falcon 9 Block 5	F9-067	(United States) Vandenberg SLC-4E		(United States) SpaceX	
11 January; 15:31	(United States) Iridium NEXT 66–75	Iridium	Low Earth	Communications	In orbit	Operational
15 January	(Iran) Simorgh		(Iran) Semnan LP-2		(Iran) ISA	
15 January	(Iran) Payam-e Amirkabir / AUTSAT 1	Amirkabir University of Technology	Low Earth	Earth observation	15 January	Launch failure
15 January	Third stage malfunctioned, satellite failed to reach orbit.					
18 January; 00:50:20	(Japan) Epsilon	Epsilon-4	(Japan) Uchinoura		(Japan) JAXA	
18 January; 00:50:20	(Japan) RAPIS-1	JAXA	Low Earth (SSO)	Technology demonstration	In orbit	Successful
18 January; 00:50:20	(Japan) ALE-1 / ALE-DOM	Astro Live Experiences	Low Earth (SSO)	Artificial meteor shower	ALE-1: In orbit ALE-DOM: 3 August 2022	Payload failure
18 January; 00:50:20	(Japan) Hodoyoshi-2 (RISESAT)	Tohoku University	Low Earth (SSO)	Earth observation	14 March 2023	Successful
18 January; 00:50:20	(Vietnam) MicroDragon	VNSC	Low Earth (SSO)	Technology demonstration	1 October 2024	Operational
18 January; 00:50:20	⚀ (Singapore) / (Japan) AOBA-VELOX 4	Nanyang Technological University, Kyutech	Low Earth (SSO)	Technology demonstration	24 March 2023	Successful
18 January; 00:50:20	⚀ (Japan) NEXUS	Nihon University	Low Earth (SSO)	Amateur radio	9 November 2023	Successful
18 January; 00:50:20	⚀ (Japan) OrigamiSat-1	Tokyo Institute of Technology	Low Earth (SSO)	Technology demonstration	30 April 2022	Successful
18 January; 00:50:20	Launch of the Innovative Satellite Technology Demonstration-1 mission.					
19 January; 19:05	(United States) Delta IV Heavy	D-382	(United States) Vandenberg SLC-6		(United States) ULA	
19 January; 19:05	(United States) KH-11 17 (USA-290)	NRO	Low Earth	Reconnaissance	In orbit	Operational
19 January; 19:05	NROL-71 mission.					
21 January; 05:42	(China) Long March 11	Y6	(China) Jiuquan LS-95A		(China) CASC	
21 January; 05:42	(China) Jilin-1 Hyperspectral-01 (Jilin Lincao 1)	Chang Guang Satellite Technology	Low Earth	Earth observation	In orbit	Operational
21 January; 05:42	(China) Jilin-1 Hyperspectral-02 (Wenchang Chaosun 1)	Chang Guang Satellite Technology	Low Earth	Earth observation	In orbit	Operational
21 January; 05:42	⚀ (China) Xiaoxiang 1-03	Tianyi Research Institute	Low Earth	Technology demonstration	14 June 2022	Successful
21 January; 05:42	⚀ (China) Lingque 1A	Beijing ZeroG Technology	Low Earth	Earth observation	14 June 2022	Successful
24 January; 18:07	(India) PSLV-DL	C44	(India) Satish Dhawan FLP		(India) ISRO	
24 January; 18:07	(India) Microsat-R	DRDO	Low Earth	Earth observation ASAT target	27 March	Destroyed
24 January; 18:07	⚀ (India) Kalamsat	Space Kidz India	Low Earth	HAM Radio	22 December 2023	Successful
24 January; 18:07	Maiden flight of PSLV-DL. Microsat-R served as target for Indian ASAT experiment on 27 March 2019.					
← Jan; Feb; Mar; Apr; May; Jun; Jul; Aug; Sep; Oct; Nov; Dec →; === February ===
5 February	(Iran) Safir-1B		(Iran) Semnan LP-1		(Iran) ISA	
5 February	(Iran) Dousti	Sharif University of Technology	Low Earth	Communications, Remote sensing	5 February	Launch failure
5 February; 21:01	(France) Ariane 5 ECA	VA247	(France) Kourou ELA-3		(France) Arianespace	
5 February; 21:01	(Greece) Hellas Sat 4 / (Saudi Arabia) SaudiGeoSat-1	Hellas-Sat / ArabSat	Geosynchronous	Communications	In orbit	Operational
5 February; 21:01	(India) GSAT-31	ISRO	Geosynchronous	Communications	In orbit	Operational
21 February; 16:47	(Russia) Soyuz-2.1b / Fregat-M		(Kazakhstan) Baikonur Site 31/6		(Russia) Roscosmos	
21 February; 16:47	(Egypt) EgyptSat A	NARSS	Low Earth	Earth observation	In orbit	Operational
21 February; 16:47	Third stage anomaly but achieved orbit in contingency mode					
22 February; 01:45	(United States) Falcon 9 Block 5	F9-068	(United States) Cape Canaveral SLC-40		(United States) SpaceX	
22 February; 01:45	(Indonesia) Nusantara Satu	PSN	Geosynchronous	Communications	In orbit	Operational
22 February; 01:45	(Israel) Beresheet	SpaceIL	Moon transfer	Lunar lander	11 April	Landing failure
22 February; 01:45	(United States) S5	AFRL	Geosynchronous	Technology demonstration	In orbit	Operational
22 February; 01:45	Beresheet raised its orbit towards the Moon from a supersynchronous transfer orbit with 60,000 km apogee.					
27 February; 21:37	(Russia) Soyuz ST-B / Fregat-M	VS21	(France) Kourou ELS		(France) Arianespace	
27 February; 21:37	(United Kingdom) OneWeb × 6	OneWeb	Low Earth	Communications	In orbit	Operational
27 February; 21:37	First flight for OneWeb satellite constellation. Kourou flight 1.					
← Jan; Feb; Mar; Apr; May; Jun; Jul; Aug; Sep; Oct; Nov; Dec →; === March ===
2 March; 07:49:03	(United States) Falcon 9 Block 5	F9-069	(United States) Kennedy LC-39A		(United States) SpaceX	
2 March; 07:49:03	(United States) SpX-DM1	SpaceX / NASA	Low Earth (ISS)	Flight test / ISS logistics	8 March	Successful
2 March; 07:49:03	Crew Dragon Demo 1: Test of the SpaceX Dragon 2 as part of Commercial Crew Development program.					
9 March; 17:28	(China) Long March 3B/E	3B-Y54	(China) Xichang LC-2		(China) CASC	
9 March; 17:28	(China) Chinasat 6C (Zhongxing 6C)	China Satcom	Geosynchronous	Communications	In orbit	Operational
9 March; 17:28	300th launch of the Long March rocket family.					
14 March; 19:14:09	(Russia) Soyuz-FG		(Kazakhstan) Baikonur Site 1/5		(Russia) Roscosmos	
14 March; 19:14:09	(Russia) Soyuz MS-12 / 58S	Roscosmos	Low Earth (ISS)	Expedition 59/60	3 October; 10:59	Successful
14 March; 19:14:09	Crewed flight with three cosmonauts.					
16 March; 00:26	(United States) Delta IV M+(5,4)	D-383	(United States) Cape Canaveral SLC-37B		(United States) ULA	
16 March; 00:26	(United States) WGS-10 (USA-291)	U.S. Air Force	Geosynchronous	Communications	In orbit	Operational
16 March; 00:26	Last flight of Delta IV M+ (5,4) variant					
22 March; 01:50:35	(Italy) Vega	VV14	(France) Kourou ELV		(France) Arianespace	
22 March; 01:50:35	(Italy) PRISMA	Italian Space Agency	Low Earth (SSO)	Earth observation	In orbit	Operational
22 March; 01:50:35	600th satellite orbited by Arianespace					
27 March; 09:39	(China) OS-M1		(China) Jiuquan LS-95B		(China) OneSpace	
27 March; 09:39	(China) Lingque 1B	Beijing ZeroG Technology	Low Earth	Earth observation	27 March	Launch failure
27 March; 09:39	Maiden flight of OS-M1 rocket.					
28 March; 23:27	(United States) Electron	"Two Thumbs Up"	(New Zealand) Mahia LC-1A		(United States) Rocket Lab	
28 March; 23:27	(United States) R3D2	DARPA	Low Earth	Technology demonstration	23 May 2021; 10:00	Successful
31 March; 15:50	(China) Long March 3B/E	3B-Y44	(China) Xichang LC-2		(China) CASC	
31 March; 15:50	(China) Tianlian 2-01	CNSA	Geosynchronous	Communications (tracking and relay)	In orbit	Operational
← Jan; Feb; Mar; Apr; May; Jun; Jul; Aug; Sep; Oct; Nov; Dec →; === April ===
1 April; 03:57	(India) PSLV-QL	C45	(India) Satish Dhawan SLP		(India) ISRO	
1 April; 03:57	(India) EMISAT	ISRO	Low Earth	ELINT	In orbit	Operational
1 April; 03:57	⚀ (Spain) Aistechsat-3	GomSpace	Low Earth	Communications, Traffic monitoring	In orbit	Operational
1 April; 03:57	⚀ (Switzerland) Astrocast 0.2	Astrocast SA	Low Earth	Communications	19 November 2023	Successful
1 April; 03:57	⚀ (Lithuania) BlueWalker 1	AST & Science	Low Earth	Test flight	29 November 2023	Successful
1 April; 03:57	⚀ (United States) Flock-4a × 20	Planet Labs	Low Earth	Earth observation	First: 14 March 2023; Last: 8 August 2023	Successful
1 April; 03:57	⚀ (United States) Lemur-2 × 4	Spire Global	Low Earth	Earth observation	First: 7 March 2023; Last: 30 June 2023	Successful
1 April; 03:57	⚀ (Lithuania) M6P	SpaceWorks Orbital / Lacuna Space	Low Earth	Communications	20 July 2023	Successful
1 April; 03:57	Maiden flight of PSLV-QL					
4 April; 11:01:35	(Russia) Soyuz-2.1a		(Kazakhstan) Baikonur Site 31/6		(Russia) Roscosmos	
4 April; 11:01:35	(Russia) Progress MS-11 / 72P	Roscosmos	Low Earth (ISS)	ISS logistics	29 July	Successful
4 April; 17:03	(Russia) Soyuz ST-B / Fregat-MT	VS22	(France) Kourou ELS		(France) Arianespace	
4 April; 17:03	(Luxembourg) O3b × 4 (FM17–FM20)	SES S.A.	Medium Earth	Communications	In orbit	Operational
11 April; 22:35	(United States) Falcon Heavy	FH-002	(United States) Kennedy LC-39A		(United States) SpaceX	
11 April; 22:35	(Saudi Arabia) Arabsat-6A	ArabSat	Geosynchronous	Communications	In orbit	Operational
17 April; 20:46	(United States) Antares 230		(United States) MARS LP-0A		(United States) Northrop Grumman	
17 April; 20:46	(United States) Cygnus NG-11; S.S. Roger Chaffee	NASA	Low Earth (ISS)	ISS logistics	6 December	Successful
17 April; 20:46	⚀ (United States) AeroCube-10 × 2	The Aerospace Corporation	Low Earth	Technology demonstration	10A: 4 May 2023; 10B: 15 May 2023	Successful
17 April; 20:46	⚀ (France) EntrySat	ISAE-SUPAERO / ONERA	Low Earth	Technology demonstration	10 August 2021	Successful
17 April; 20:46	⚀ (United Kingdom) IOD-1 GEMS	Orbital Micro Systems	Low Earth	Technology demonstration / Meteorology	3 April 2021; 14:11	Successful
17 April; 20:46	⚀ (Poland) KRAKsat	AGH University of Science and Technology / Jagiellonian University	Low Earth	Technology demonstration	17 January 2022	Spacecraft failure
17 April; 20:46	⚀ (Nepal) NepaliSat-1	KyuTech / NAST	Low Earth	Technology demonstration	4 October 2021	Successful
17 April; 20:46	⚀ (United States) Quantum-Radar 3	SEOPS	Low Earth	Satellite laser ranging	7 March 2023	Successful
17 April; 20:46	⚀ (Sri Lanka) Raavana 1	ACCIMT	Low Earth	Technology demonstration	3 October 2021	Successful
17 April; 20:46	⚀ (United States) SASSI2	University of Illinois / Purdue University	Low Earth	Technology demonstration / Education	28 April	Spacecraft failure
17 April; 20:46	⚀ (United States) Seeker	NASA	Low Earth	Technology demonstration	In orbit	Successful
17 April; 20:46	⚀ (Singapore) SpooQy-1	NUS / SSTA	Low Earth	Technology demonstration	16 October 2021	Successful
17 April; 20:46	⚀ (Poland) Swiatowid	SatRevolution	Low Earth	Technology demonstration / Earth observation	14 March 2021	Successful
17 April; 20:46	⚀ (United States) ThinSat × 60	Virginia Space	Low Earth	Technology demonstration / Education	28 April	Successful (49/60 ThinSats)
17 April; 20:46	⚀ (Japan) Uguisu	KyuTech	Low Earth	Technology demonstration	7 October 2021	Successful
17 April; 20:46	⚀ (United States) VCC A (Aeternitas)	Virginia Space Grant Consortium	Low Earth	Technology demonstration	18 October 2021	Spacecraft failure
17 April; 20:46	⚀ (United States) VCC B (Libertas)	Virginia Space Grant Consortium	Low Earth	Technology demonstration	13 October 2021	Spacecraft failure
17 April; 20:46	⚀ (United States) VCC C (Ceres)	Virginia Space Grant Consortium	Low Earth	Technology demonstration	15 May 2021	Spacecraft failure
17 April; 20:46	SASSI2 and the 60 ThinSats were secondary payloads carried aboard the Antares upper stage booster. EntrySat, IOD-1, KRAKsat, Swiatowid, Virginia CubeSat Constellation (VCC), Uguisu, Raavana 1, NepaliSat-1, and SpooQy-1 were carried in Cygnus and later deployed from the ISS. The AeroCubes and Seeker were carried in the unpressurized compartment of Cygnus, and deployed from Cygnus after its departure from the ISS. Uguisu, Raavana 1, NepaliSat-1, and SpooQy-1 were deployed into orbit from the ISS on 17 June 2019. IOD-1 GEMS, KRAKsat, Swiatowid, EntrySat, and three VCC satellites were deployed into orbit on 3 July 2019. NepaliSat-1 is the first Nepalese satellite and Raavana 1 is the first Sri Lankan satellite. On the departure of Cygnus NG-11 from the ISS, SlingShot Deployer—carrying Quantum Radar, NARSSCube-2, RFTSat, and ORCA—was placed on its hatch bulkhead. Those CubeSats and also AeroCube-10 were deployed into orbit from Cygnus on 7 August 2019. The VCC satellites were unresponsive to attempts to contact them following their deployment.					
20 April; 14:41	(China) Long March 3B/E	3B-Y59	(China) Xichang LC-3		(China) CASC	
20 April; 14:41	(China) BeiDou-3 I1Q (Beidou-44)	CNSA	IGSO	Navigation	In orbit	Operational
29 April; 22:52	(China) Long March 4B	4B-Y36	(China) Taiyuan LC-9		(China) CASC	
29 April; 22:52	(China) Tianhui 2-01A	CNSA	Low Earth (SSO)	Earth observation	In orbit	Operational
29 April; 22:52	(China) Tianhui 2-01B	CNSA	Low Earth (SSO)	Earth observation	In orbit	Operational
← Jan; Feb; Mar; Apr; May; Jun; Jul; Aug; Sep; Oct; Nov; Dec →; === May ===
4 May; 06:48	(United States) Falcon 9 Block 5	F9-070	(United States) Cape Canaveral SLC-40		(United States) SpaceX	
4 May; 06:48	(United States) SpaceX CRS-17	NASA	Low Earth (ISS)	ISS logistics	3 June	Successful
4 May; 06:48	(United States) Red-Eye 1 (Pinot)	DARPA	Low Earth	Technology demonstration	24 July 2022	Successful
4 May; 06:48	Red-Eye 1 was carried in CRS-17, and deployed into orbit from the ISS on 27 June 2019.					
5 May; 06:00	(United States) Electron	"That's a Funny Looking Cactus"	(New Zealand) Mahia LC-1A		(United States) Rocket Lab	
5 May; 06:00	(United States) Harbinger (ICEYE X3)	U.S. Air Force	Low Earth	Technology demonstration	In orbit	Operational
5 May; 06:00	⚀ (United States) Falcon ODE	U.S. Air Force	Low Earth	Technology demonstration	In orbit	Operational
5 May; 06:00	⚀ (United States) SPARC-1	U.S. Air Force	Low Earth	Technology demonstration	26 June 2023	Successful
17 May; 15:48	(China) Long March 3C/E	3C-Y16	(China) Xichang LC-2		(China) CASC	
17 May; 15:48	(China) BeiDou-2 G8 (Beidou-45)	CNSA	Geosynchronous	Navigation	In orbit	Operational
22 May; 00:00	(India) PSLV-CA	C46	(India) Satish Dhawan FLP		(India) ISRO	
22 May; 00:00	(India) RISAT-2B	ISRO	Low Earth (SSO)	Earth observation (radar)	In orbit	Operational
22 May; 22:49	(China) Long March 4C	4C-Y23	(China) Taiyuan LC-9		(China) CASC	
22 May; 22:49	(China) Yaogan 33	CAS	Low Earth	Reconnaissance	22 May	Launch failure
24 May; 02:30	(United States) Falcon 9 Block 5	F9-071	(United States) Cape Canaveral SLC-40		(United States) SpaceX	
24 May; 02:30	(United States) Starlink × 60	SpaceX	Low Earth	Communications	First: 20 February 2020; Last: 24 October 2022	Successful
24 May; 02:30	Starlink test mission, launching 60 Starlink v0.9 experimental satellites.					
27 May; 06:23	(Russia) Soyuz-2.1b / Fregat-M		(Russia) Plesetsk Site 43/4		(Russia) RVSN RF	
27 May; 06:23	(Russia) GLONASS-M 758	VKS	Medium Earth	Navigation	In orbit	Operational
30 May; 17:42	(Russia) Proton-M / Briz-M P4		(Kazakhstan) Baikonur Site 200/39		(Russia) Roscosmos	
30 May; 17:42	(Russia) Yamal-601	Gazprom Space Systems	Geosynchronous	Communications	In orbit	Operational
← Jan; Feb; Mar; Apr; May; Jun; Jul; Aug; Sep; Oct; Nov; Dec →; === June ===
5 June; 04:06	(China) Long March 11H		(China) Yellow Sea Launch Platform		(China) CASC	
5 June; 04:06	(China) Bufeng-1A	CAST	Low Earth	Earth observation	In orbit	Operational
5 June; 04:06	(China) Bufeng-1B	CAST	Low Earth	Earth observation	In orbit	Operational
5 June; 04:06	(China) Jilin-1 Gaofen-03A	Chang Guang Satellite Technology	Low Earth	Earth observation	In orbit	Operational
5 June; 04:06	(China) Tianxiang-1A	CETC	Low Earth	Technology demonstration Communications	In orbit	Operational
5 June; 04:06	(China) Tianxiang-1B	CETC	Low Earth	Technology demonstration Communications	In orbit	Operational
5 June; 04:06	⚀ (China) Tianqi-3 (Tao Xingzhi)	Guodian Gaoke	Low Earth	Technology demonstration	In orbit	Operational
5 June; 04:06	⚀ (China) Xiaoxiang 1-04	Tianyi Research Institute	Low Earth	Technology demonstration	In orbit	Operational
5 June; 04:06	China's first sea launch in the Yellow Sea off Shandong.					
12 June; 14:17	(United States) Falcon 9 Block 5	F9-072	(United States) Vandenberg SLC-4E		(United States) SpaceX	
12 June; 14:17	(Canada) RADARSAT Constellation × 3	Canadian Space Agency	Low Earth (SSO)	Earth observation	In orbit	Operational
20 June; 21:43	(France) Ariane 5 ECA	VA248	(France) Kourou ELA-3		(France) Arianespace	
20 June; 21:43	(France) Eutelsat 7C	Eutelsat	Geosynchronous	Communications	In orbit	Operational
20 June; 21:43	(United States) AT&T T-16	DirecTV	Geosynchronous	Satellite television	In orbit	Operational
24 June; 18:09	(China) Long March 3B/E	3B-Y60	(China) Xichang LC-3		(China) CASC	
24 June; 18:09	(China) BeiDou-3 I2Q (Beidou-46)	CNSA	IGSO	Navigation	In orbit	Operational
25 June; 06:30	(United States) Falcon Heavy	FH-003	(United States) Kennedy LC-39A		(United States) SpaceX	
25 June; 06:30	(United States) STP-2	U.S. Air Force	Low Earth, Medium Earth	Technology demonstration	In orbit	Operational
25 June; 06:30	(United States) DSX	AFRL	Medium Earth	Technology demonstration	In orbit	Successful
25 June; 06:30	(United States) (Taiwan) COSMIC-2 × 6	NOAA / NSPO	Low Earth	Atmospheric	In orbit	Operational
25 June; 06:30	(United States) GPIM	NASA	Low Earth	Technology demonstration	14 October 2020	Successful
25 June; 06:30	(United States) NPSAT1	NRL	Low Earth	Atmospheric	In orbit	Operational
25 June; 06:30	(United States) Oculus-ASR	Michigan Technological University	Low Earth	Technology demonstration	23 February 2023	Successful
25 June; 06:30	(United States) OTB	General Atomics Electromagnetic Systems	Low Earth	Technology demonstration	In orbit	Operational
25 June; 06:30	(United States) Prox-1	Georgia Institute of Technology	Low Earth	Technology demonstration	In orbit	Operational
25 June; 06:30	⚀ (United States) ARMADILLO	UT Austin	Low Earth	Technology demonstration	23 August 2022	Successful
25 June; 06:30	⚀ (United States) BRICSat-2	United States Naval Academy	Low Earth	Technology demonstration / Amateur radio	20 April 2022	Successful
25 June; 06:30	⚀ (United States) E-TBEx A	NASA	Low Earth	Atmospheric	9 March 2021	Successful
25 June; 06:30	⚀ (United States) E-TBEx B	NASA	Low Earth	Atmospheric	22 February 2021	Successful
25 June; 06:30	⚀ (United States) FalconSAT-7	USAFA	Low Earth	Technology demonstration	2 July 2021	Spacecraft failure
25 June; 06:30	⚀ (United States) LEO	Cal Poly	Low Earth	Technology demonstration	28 October 2021	Successful
25 June; 06:30	⚀ (United States) LightSail 2	The Planetary Society	Low Earth	Technology demonstration	17 November 2022	Successful
25 June; 06:30	⚀ (United States) PSAT2	United States Naval Academy	Low Earth	Amateur radio	15 February 2023	Successful
25 June; 06:30	⚀ (United States) StangSat	Merritt Island High School	Low Earth	Technology demonstration	In orbit	Operational
25 June; 06:30	⚀ (United States) TEPCE × 2	NRL	Low Earth	Technology demonstration	1 February 2020	Successful
25 June; 06:30	STP-2 carries multiple cubesats and other small payloads for NASA, NOAA, The Planetary Society and others in addition to the primary mission which consists of multiple U.S. Air Force payloads.					
29 June; 04:30	(United States) Electron	"Make It Rain"	(New Zealand) Mahia LC-1A		(United States) Rocket Lab	
29 June; 04:30	(United States) BlackSky Global 3	BlackSky Global	Low Earth	Earth observation	In orbit	Operational
29 June; 04:30	⚀ (Australia) ACRUX-1	Melbourne Space Program	Low Earth	Education	17 June 2022	Successful
29 June; 04:30	⚀ (Mexico) Painani 1	SEDENA	Low Earth	Technology demonstration	14 January 2023	Successful
29 June; 04:30	⚀ (United States) Prometheus 2-7	USSOCOM	Low Earth	Technology demonstration	20 May 2022	Successful
29 June; 04:30	⚀ (United States) Prometheus 2-9	USSOCOM	Low Earth	Technology demonstration	6 June 2022	Successful
29 June; 04:30	⚀ (United States) SpaceBEE 8	Swarm Technologies	Low Earth	Communications	26 April 2021	Successful
29 June; 04:30	⚀ (United States) SpaceBEE 9	Swarm Technologies	Low Earth	Communications	16 December 2021	Successful
← Jan; Feb; Mar; Apr; May; Jun; Jul; Aug; Sep; Oct; Nov; Dec →

== Suborbital flights ==
Date and time (UTC)	Rocket	Flight number	Launch site		LSP	
Date and time (UTC)	Payload (⚀ = CubeSat)	Operator	Orbit	Function	Decay (UTC)	Outcome
Date and time (UTC)	Remarks					
4 January; 09:27	(Canada) Black Brant XIIA		(Norway) Andøya		(United States) NASA	
4 January; 09:27	(United States) CAPER-2	Dartmouth College	Suborbital	Auroral research	4 January	Successful
4 January; 09:27	Apogee: 774 kilometres (481 mi)					
13 January; 09:13	(United States) Terrier-Improved Malemute		(Norway) Andøya		(United States) NASA	
13 January; 09:13	(United States) G-CHASER	University of Colorado	Suborbital	Student payloads	13 January	Successful
13 January; 09:13	Apogee: 174 kilometres (108 mi)					
22 January	(Israel) Silver Sparrow ?		F-15 Eagle, Israel		(Israel) IAF	
22 January		IAI/IDF	Suborbital	Missile test target	22 January	Successful
22 January	Arrow III target, successfully intercepted					
22 January	(Israel) Arrow III		(Israel) Negev		(Israel) IAF	
22 January		IAI/IDF	Suborbital	Flight test	22 January	Successful
22 January	Successful intercept, Apogee: ~200 kilometres (120 mi)					
23 January; 15:05	(United States) New Shepard	NS-10	(United States) Corn Ranch		(United States) Blue Origin	
23 January; 15:05	(United States) Crew Capsule 2.0	Blue Origin	Suborbital	Test flight	23 January	Successful
23 January; 15:05	Tenth test flight of the New Shepard development program, fourth one with the current vehicle.					
6 February; 07:01	(United States) Minuteman-III		(United States) Vandenberg Air Force Base LF-04		(United States) US Air Force	
6 February; 07:01	(United States) FTU-1	US Air Force	Suborbital	Test flight	6 February	Successful
6 February; 08:31	(Russia) RS-24 Yars		(Russia) Plesetsk		(Russia) RVSN	
6 February; 08:31		RVSN	Suborbital	Missile test	6 February	Successful
12 February	(India) PDV-II		(India) ITR IC-4		(India) DRDO	
12 February	(India) ASAT	DRDO	Suborbital	Satellite intercept	12 February	Launch failure
12 February	First attempt of Mission Shakhti (ASAT Test with Microsat-R as target)					
22 February; 16:54	(United States) SpaceShipTwo	VF-01	(United States) White Knight Two, from Mojave Spaceport		(United States) Virgin Galactic	
22 February; 16:54	(United States) VSS Unity	Virgin Galactic	Suborbital	Test flight	22 February	Successful
22 February; 16:54	Second crewed sub-orbital high altitude flight of SpaceShipTwo with three crew members on board, pilot David Mackay, co-pilot Mike Masucci and chief trainer Beth Moses, Apogee: 89.9 kilometres (55.9 mi)					
2 March; 17:45	(United States) SARGE		(United States) Spaceport America, New Mexico		(United States) Exos Aerospace	
2 March; 17:45	SARGE M1	Exos Aerospace	Suborbital	Microgravity Research	2 March	Partial failure
2 March; 17:45	Second launch of the SARGE suborbital launch vehicle, it carried several small research payloads and was intended to reach a peak altitude of 80 kilometers, but winds kept the rocket from achieving its planned altitude, it reached only an apogee of 20 kilometres (12 mi)					
25 March; 17:20	(United States) ICBM-T2		(United States) Ronald Reagan Ballistic Missile Defense Test Site		(United States) MDA	
25 March; 17:20	(United States) FTG-11 target	MDA	Suborbital	ABM target	25 March	Successful
25 March; 17:20	Ballistic missile target for interception					
25 March; 17:30	(United States) GBI-OBV		(United States) Vandenberg Air Force Base		(United States) MDA	
25 March; 17:30	(United States) FTG-11 Interceptor	MDA	Suborbital	ABM test	25 March	Successful
25 March; 17:30	Ballistic missile interceptor					
25 March; 17:31	(United States) GBI-OBV		(United States) Vandenberg Air Force Base		(United States) MDA	
25 March; 17:31	(United States) FTG-11 Interceptor	MDA	Suborbital	ABM test	25 March	Successful
25 March; 17:31	Ballistic missile interceptor					
27 March; 05:40	(India) PDV-II		(India) ITR IC-4		(India) DRDO	
27 March; 05:40	(India) ASAT	DRDO	Suborbital	Satellite intercept	27 March	Successful
27 March; 05:40	Mission Shakhti (ASAT Test with Microsat-R as target), Apogee: 270 kilometres (170 mi), satellite successfully destroyed					
5 April; 22:14	(Canada) Black Brant XIA		(Norway) Andøya		(United States) NASA	
5 April; 22:14	(United States) AZURE 1	Clemson	Suborbital	Auroral	5 April	Successful
5 April; 22:14	Apogee: 320 kilometres (200 mi)					
5 April; 22:16	(Canada) Black Brant XIA		(Norway) Andøya		(United States) NASA	
5 April; 22:16	(United States) AZURE 2	Clemson	Suborbital	Auroral	5 April	Successful
5 April; 22:16	Apogee: 320 kilometres (200 mi)					
11 April; 16:51	(Canada) Black Brant IX		(United States) White Sands Missile Range		(United States) NASA	
11 April; 16:51	(United States) (Japan) (Spain) (Norway) (France) CLASP-2	NASA / NAOJ / JAXA / IAC / IAS	Suborbital	Solar astronomy	11 April	Successful
11 April; 16:51	Apogee: 274 kilometres (170 mi)					
21 April	(United States) Traveler IV		(United States) Spaceport America, New Mexico		(United States) USC Rocket Propulsion Lab	
21 April	Flight test	–	Suborbital	Flight test	21 April	Successful
21 April	First suborbital flight by a student team. Apogee: 104 kilometres (65 mi)					
22 April; 23:28	(China) Tianxing 1	Y1	(China)		(China) Space Transportation	
22 April; 23:28	(China)	Space Transportation	Suborbital	Flight test	22 April	Successful
22 April; 23:28	Test flight of the Tianxing 1 suborbital spaceplane.					
23 April	(United States) Terrier Malemute		(United States) Pacific Missile Range Facility		(United States) NNSA	
23 April	(United States) HOT SHOT 2	NNSA	Suborbital	Technology experiments	23 April	Successful
23 April	Apogee: ~320 kilometres (200 mi)?					
24 April	(United States) Terrier Malemute		(United States) Pacific Missile Range Facility		(United States) NNSA	
24 April	(United States) HOT SHOT 3	NNSA	Suborbital	Technology experiments	24 April	Successful
24 April	Apogee: ~320 kilometres (200 mi)?					
1 May; 09:42	(United States) Minuteman-III		(United States) Vandenberg Air Force Base LF-10		(United States) US Air Force	
1 May; 09:42		US Air Force	Suborbital	Test flight	1 May	Successful
2 May; 13:35	(United States) New Shepard	NS-11	(United States) Corn Ranch		(United States) Blue Origin	
2 May; 13:35	(United States) Crew Capsule 2.0	Blue Origin	Suborbital	Test flight	2 May	Successful
2 May; 13:35	Took 38 research payloads into space					
3 May; 20:45	(Japan) Momo 3		(Japan) Taiki Aerospace Research Field		(Japan) Interstellar Technologies	
3 May; 20:45	(Japan)	Kochi University of Technology	Suborbital	Infrasound propagation measurement	3 May	Successful
3 May; 20:45	Apogee: 113 kilometres (70 mi)					
9 May; 07:40	(United States) Minuteman-III		(United States) Vandenberg Air Force Base LF-09		(United States) US Air Force	
9 May; 07:40		US Air Force	Suborbital	Test flight	9 May	Successful
9 May	(United States) UGM-133 Trident II		(United States) USS Rhode Island (SSBN-740), ETR		(United States) US Navy	
9 May		US Navy	Suborbital	Missile test	9 May	Successful
9 May	Demonstration and Shakedown Operation (DASO) 29					
10 May	(United States) SM-3-IB		(United States) USS Roosevelt (DDG-80), Hebrides Range		(United States) US Navy	
10 May		US Navy	Suborbital	Test flight	10 May	Successful
10 May	FS-19 E4, apogee: ~150 kilometres (93 mi)?					
23 May	(Pakistan) Shaheen-II		(Pakistan) Sonmiani		(Pakistan) ASFC	
23 May		ASFC	Suborbital	Missile test	23 May	Successful
13 June; 02:21	(Brazil) VSB-30?		(Sweden) Esrange		(Germany) DLR / (Sweden) SSC	
13 June; 02:21	(Germany) ATEK/MAPHEUS-8	DLR	Suborbital	Technology demonstration	13 June	Successful
13 June; 02:21	Apogee: 240 kilometres (150 mi)					
19 June; 11:28	(Canada) Black Brant IX		(Marshall Islands) Kwajalein Atoll		(United States) NASA	
19 June; 11:28	(United States) TooWINDY 1	NASA	Suborbital	Ionosphere research	19 June	Successful
19 June; 11:28	Apogee: 373 kilometres (232 mi)					
19 June; 11:33	(Canada) Black Brant IX		(Marshall Islands) Kwajalein Atoll		(United States) NASA	
19 June; 11:33	(United States) TooWINDY 2	NASA	Suborbital	Ionosphere research	19 June	Successful
19 June; 11:33	Apogee: 412 kilometres (256 mi)					
20 June; 09:38	(United States) Terrier-Improved Orion		(United States) Wallops Flight Facility		(United States) NASA	
20 June; 09:38	(United States) RockOn	University of Colorado	Suborbital	Student payloads	20 June	Successful
20 June; 09:38	Apogee: 117 kilometres (73 mi)					
24 June; 06:52	(Brazil) VSB-30		(Sweden) Esrange		(Europe) EuroLaunch	
24 June; 06:52	(Sweden) MASER-14	SSC	Suborbital	Microgravity	24 June	Successful
24 June; 06:52	apogee: 260 kilometres (160 mi)					
29 June; 18:00	(United States) SARGE		(United States) Spaceport America, New Mexico		(United States) Exos Aerospace	
29 June; 18:00	SARGE M1	Exos Aerospace	Suborbital	Microgravity Research	29 June	Launch failure
29 June; 18:00	Third launch of the SARGE suborbital launch vehicle, it carried several small research payloads for nine clients. The flight failed seconds after launch. However, the rocket was recovered.					
