= List of spaceflight launches in July–December 2019 =

This is a list of orbital and suborbital launches during the second half of the year 2019. For all other spaceflight activities, see 2019 in spaceflight. For launches in the first half of 2019, see List of spaceflight launches in January–June 2019. For launches in 2020, see 2020 in spaceflight.

== Orbital launches ==
- ← Jan
- Feb
- Mar
- Apr
- May
- Jun
- Jul
- Aug
- Sep
- Oct
- Nov
- Dec →

Date and time (UTC)	Rocket	Flight number	Launch site		LSP	
Date and time (UTC)	Payload (⚀ = CubeSat)	Operator	Orbit	Function	Decay (UTC)	Outcome
Date and time (UTC)	Remarks					
← Jan; Feb; Mar; Apr; May; Jun; Jul; Aug; Sep; Oct; Nov; Dec →; === July ===
5 July; 05:41	(Russia) Soyuz-2.1b / Fregat-M		(Russia) Vostochny Site 1S		(Russia) Roscosmos	
5 July; 05:41	(Russia) Meteor-M №2-2	Roscosmos	Low Earth (SSO)	Meteorology	In orbit	Operational
5 July; 05:41	(United States) CarboNIX	Exolaunch	Low Earth (SSO)	Technology demonstration	In orbit	Operational
5 July; 05:41	(United Kingdom) DoT-1	SSTL	Low Earth (SSO)	Technology demonstration	In orbit	Operational
5 July; 05:41	(Finland) ICEYE X4	ICEYE	Low Earth (SSO)	Earth observation	In orbit	Operational
5 July; 05:41	(Finland) ICEYE X5	ICEYE	Low Earth (SSO)	Earth observation	In orbit	Operational
5 July; 05:41	⚀ (Russia) AmurSat	Amur State University	Low Earth (SSO)	Technology demonstration	In orbit	Operational
5 July; 05:41	⚀ (Germany) BeeSat × 4 (10-13)	Technische Universität Berlin	Low Earth (SSO)	Technology demonstration	In orbit	Operational
5 July; 05:41	⚀ (Germany) BeeSat 9	Technische Universität Berlin	Low Earth (SSO)	Technology demonstration	In orbit	Operational
5 July; 05:41	⚀ (Germany) D-Star One EXOCONNECT	German Orbital Systems	Low Earth (SSO)	Earth observation	In orbit	Operational
5 July; 05:41	⚀ (Germany) D-Star One LightSat	German Orbital Systems	Low Earth (SSO)	Earth observation	In orbit	Operational
5 July; 05:41	⚀ (United States) El Camino Real	Momentus Space	Low Earth (SSO)	Technology demonstration	In orbit	Spacecraft failure
5 July; 05:41	⚀ (Thailand) JAISAT 1	RAST	Low Earth (SSO)	Amateur radio	In orbit	Operational
5 July; 05:41	⚀ (United States) Lemur-2 × 8	Spire Global	Low Earth (SSO)	Earth observation SIGINT	In orbit	Operational
5 July; 05:41	⚀ (Czech Republic) Lucky-7	SkyFox Labs	Low Earth (SSO)	Technology demonstration	In orbit	Operational
5 July; 05:41	⚀ (Germany) MOVE-2b	TUM	Low Earth (SSO)	Earth observation	In orbit	Operational
5 July; 05:41	⚀ (France) MTCube (ROBUSTA 1C)	University of Montpellier	Low Earth (SSO)	Technology demonstration	In orbit	Operational
5 July; 05:41	⚀ (Israel) NSLSat 1	NSLComm	Low Earth (SSO)	Technology demonstration	In orbit	Operational
5 July; 05:41	⚀ (Sweden) (Germany) (Denmark) (Italy) SEAM 2.0	KTH / AAC Clyde Space / GomSpace / Kayser Italia	Low Earth (SSO)	Technology demonstration	In orbit	Operational
5 July; 05:41	⚀ (Germany) SONATE	University of Würzburg	Low Earth (SSO)	Technology demonstration	In orbit	Operational
5 July; 05:41	⚀ (Russia) Sokrat	Moscow State University	Low Earth (SSO)	Technology demonstration	In orbit	Operational
5 July; 05:41	⚀ (Estonia) TTÜ101	Tallinn University of Technology	Low Earth (SSO)	Technology demonstration	In orbit	Operational
5 July; 05:41	⚀ UTE-Ecuador	Universidad Tecnológica Equinoccial	Low Earth (SSO)	Technology demonstration	In orbit	Operational
5 July; 05:41	⚀ (Russia) VDNH-80	Moscow State University / VDNKh	Low Earth (SSO)	Technology demonstration	In orbit	Operational
10 July; 17:14	(Russia) Soyuz-2-1v / Volga		(Russia) Plesetsk Site 43/4		(Russia) RVSN RF	
10 July; 17:14	(Russia) Kosmos 2535	VKS	Low Earth	Satellite inspection	In orbit	Operational
10 July; 17:14	(Russia) Kosmos 2536	VKS	Low Earth	Satellite inspection	In orbit	Operational
10 July; 17:14	(Russia) Kosmos 2537	VKS	Low Earth	Radar calibration	7 October 2023	Successful
10 July; 17:14	(Russia) Kosmos 2538	VKS	Low Earth	Radar calibration	In orbit	Operational
11 July; 01:53:03	(Italy) Vega	VV15	(France) Kourou ELV		(France) Arianespace	
11 July; 01:53:03	(United Arab Emirates) Falcon Eye 1 (fr)	UAE Armed Forces	Low Earth	IMINT (Reconnaissance)	11 July	Launch failure
11 July; 01:53:03	Possibly an ignition failure of the second stage. Later investigation findings showed the failure mostly traced into a structural failure on the second stage's forward dome resulting from higher temperatures.					
13 July; 12:30:57	(Russia) Proton-M / DM-03		(Kazakhstan) Baikonur Site 81/24		(Russia) Roscosmos	
13 July; 12:30:57	(Russia) (Germany) Spektr-RG	IKI RAN; Max Planck Institute	Sun–Earth L_{2}, halo orbit	X-ray astronomy	In orbit	Operational
13 July; 12:30:57	Russian–German high-energy astrophysics space observatory. Launching to L_{2}.					
20 July; 16:28:20	(Russia) Soyuz-FG		(Kazakhstan) Baikonur Site 1/5		(Russia) Roscosmos	
20 July; 16:28:20	(Russia) Soyuz MS-13 / 59S	Roscosmos	Low Earth (ISS)	Expedition 60/61	6 February 2020	Successful
20 July; 16:28:20	Crewed flight with three cosmonauts.					
22 July; 09:13	(India) GSLV Mk III	M1	(India) Satish Dhawan SLP		(India) ISRO	
22 July; 09:13	(India) Chandrayaan-2	ISRO	Selenocentric	Lunar orbiter	In orbit	Operational
22 July; 09:13	(India) Vikram	ISRO	Selenocentric	Lunar lander	In orbit	Landing Failure
22 July; 09:13	(India) Pragyan	ISRO	Selenocentric	Lunar rover	In orbit	Landing Failure
22 July; 09:13	Chandrayaan-2 Mission.The lander crashed on the lunar surface and broke into pieces during powered descent. The Orbiter remains operational.					
25 July; 05:00	(China) Hyperbola-1		(China) Jiuquan LS-95A		(China) i-Space	
25 July; 05:00	⚀ (China) CAS-7B	CAMSAT	Low Earth	Amateur radio	6 August	Successful
25 July; 05:00	⚀ (China) Demonstration payload	CAMSAT	Low Earth	Technology demonstration, boilerplate	26 July	Successful
25 July; 05:00	Maiden flight of Hyperbola-1.					
25 July; 22:01:56	(United States) Falcon 9 Block 5	F9-073	(United States) Cape Canaveral SLC-40		(United States) SpaceX	
25 July; 22:01:56	(United States) SpaceX CRS-18	NASA	Low Earth (ISS)	ISS logistics	27 August	Successful
25 July; 22:01:56	⚀ (United States) RFTSat	Northwest Nazarene University	Low Earth	Technology demonstration	In orbit	Operational
25 July; 22:01:56	⚀ (Egypt) NARSSCube-2	NARSS	Low Earth	Technology demonstration	In orbit	Operational
25 July; 22:01:56	⚀ (United States) ORCA-1	DARPA	Low Earth	Technology demonstration	In orbit	Operational
25 July; 22:01:56	RFTSat, NARSSCube-2, and ORCA are carried in CRS-18 to ISS. They were placed in SlingShot Deployer on Cygnus NG-11 hatch bulkhead. They were deployed into orbit by SlingShot Deployer on 7 August 2019 after the departure of Cygnus NG-11 from the ISS. The upper stage has introduced a Grey Band on this mission.					
26 July; 03:57	(China) Long March 2C	2C-Y37	(China) Xichang LC-3		(China) CASC	
26 July; 03:57	(China) Yaogan 30-05 01	CAS	Low Earth	Reconnaissance	In orbit	Operational
26 July; 03:57	(China) Yaogan 30-05 02	CAS	Low Earth	Reconnaissance	In orbit	Operational
26 July; 03:57	(China) Yaogan 30-05 03	CAS	Low Earth	Reconnaissance	In orbit	Operational
26 July; 03:57	Grid fins located on the interstage of the rocket are being used to test first stage landing zone control and recovery technologies.					
30 July; 05:56	(Russia) Soyuz-2.1a / Fregat-M		(Russia) Plesetsk Site 43/4		(Russia) RVSN RF	
30 July; 05:56	(Russia) Meridian 8 (18L)	VKS	Molniya	Communications (military)	In orbit	Operational
31 July; 12:10:46	(Russia) Soyuz-2.1a		(Kazakhstan) Baikonur Site 31/6		(Russia) Roscosmos	
31 July; 12:10:46	(Russia) Progress MS-12 / 73P	Roscosmos	Low Earth (ISS)	ISS logistics	29 November	Successful
← Jan; Feb; Mar; Apr; May; Jun; Jul; Aug; Sep; Oct; Nov; Dec →; === August ===
5 August; 21:56	(Russia) Proton-M / Briz-M		(Kazakhstan) Baikonur Site 81/24		(Russia) RVSN RF	
5 August; 21:56	(Russia) Blagovest-14L	VKS	Geosynchronous	Communications (military)	In orbit	Operational
5 August; 21:56	Fourth Blagovest satellite launch, completing the initial Blagovest satellite constellation.					
6 August; 19:30	(France) Ariane 5 ECA	VA249	(France) Kourou ELA-3		(France) Arianespace	
6 August; 19:30	EDRS-C / (United Kingdom) HYLAS-3	ESA / Avanti	Geosynchronous	Communications	In orbit	Operational
6 August; 19:30	(United States) Intelsat 39	Intelsat	Geosynchronous	Communications	In orbit	Operational
6 August; 23:23	(United States) Falcon 9 Block 5	F9-074	(United States) Cape Canaveral SLC-40		(United States) SpaceX	
6 August; 23:23	(Israel) AMOS 17	Spacecom	Geosynchronous	Communications	In orbit	Operational
6 August; 23:23	The launch was free of charge for Spacecom as compensation for AMOS-6's destruction on 1 September 2016. The booster, B1047, was expended.					
8 August; 10:13	(United States) Atlas V 551	AV-084	(United States) Cape Canaveral SLC-41		(United States) ULA	
8 August; 10:13	(United States) USA-292 (AEHF-5)	U.S. Air Force	Geosynchronous	Communications (military)	In orbit	Operational
8 August; 10:13	⚀ (United States) TDO-1	U.S. Air Force	Highly elliptical	Space debris tracking	30 December 2022	Successful
17 August; 04:11	(China) Jielong 1		(China) Jiuquan LS-95A		(China) CALT	
17 August; 04:11	(China) Tianqi-2	Guodian Gaoke	Low Earth	Technology demonstration	In orbit	Operational
17 August; 04:11	(China) Qian Sheng-1 01 (QS1-01)	Qian Sheng Exploration	Low Earth	Earth observation, communications	In orbit	Operational
17 August; 04:11	(China) Xingshidai-5	ADASpace	Low Earth	Remote sensing	In orbit	Operational
17 August; 04:11	Maiden flight of Jielong 1 (also known as Smart Dragon 1). First launch for the Qian Sheng satellite constellation.					
19 August; 12:03	(China) Long March 3B/E	3B-Y58	(China) Xichang LC-2		(China) CASC	
19 August; 12:03	(China) Chinasat 18	China Satcom	Intended: Geosynchronous; Actual: GTO	Communications	In orbit	Spacecraft failure
19 August; 12:03	Spacecraft apparently failed to deploy solar panels after stage separation. It remains inoperable in geostationary transfer orbit (GTO). The satellite has been declared as total loss by the Chinese government.					
19 August; 12:12	(United States) Electron	"Look Ma, No Hands"	(New Zealand) Mahia LC-1A		(United States) Rocket Lab	
19 August; 12:12	(United States) BlackSky Global 4	BlackSky Global	Low Earth	Earth observation	In orbit	Operational
19 August; 12:12	⚀ (France) BRO 1	UnseenLabs	Low Earth	ELINT	In orbit	Operational
19 August; 12:12	⚀ (United States) Pearl White × 2	Air Force Space Command	Low Earth	Technology demonstration	In orbit	Operational
22 August; 03:38:31	(Russia) Soyuz-2.1a		(Kazakhstan) Baikonur Site 31/6		(Russia) Roscosmos	
22 August; 03:38:31	(Russia) Soyuz MS-14 / 60S	Roscosmos	Low Earth (ISS)	Test flight / ISS logistics	6 September; 21:32	Successful
22 August; 03:38:31	Uncrewed flight to certify Soyuz-2.1a for crew transport missions with FEDOR (Skybot F-850) robot on board. First docking attempt on 24 August was aborted due to an issue on ISS, second attempt on 27 August was successful. Delivered Mini-EUSO telescope to ISS.					
22 August; 13:06	(United States) Delta IV M+ (4,2)U	D-384	(United States) Cape Canaveral SLC-37B		(United States) ULA	
22 August; 13:06	(United States) GPS IIIA-02 Magellan	U.S. Air Force	Medium Earth	Navigation	In orbit	Operational
22 August; 13:06	Last flight of the Delta IV "single stick" M+ series (Delta IV Heavy will continue flying). Named after Portuguese explorer Ferdinand Magellan.					
29 August (ground test)	(Iran) Safir-1B		(Iran) Semnan LP-1		(Iran) ISA	
29 August (ground test)	(Iran) Nahid 1	Iranian Space Research Center	Low Earth	Communications	N/A	Rocket destroyed prior to launch
29 August (ground test)	Rocket apparently exploded on the launch pad. According to the Iranian Ministry of ICT, the Nahid 1 satellite had yet to be delivered to the launch site.					
30 August; 14:00	(Russia) Rokot / Briz-KM		(Russia) Plesetsk Site 133/3		(Russia) RVSN RF	
30 August; 14:00	(Russia) Geo-IK-2 No.3 (Musson-2)	VKS	Low Earth	Geodesy	In orbit	Operational
30 August; 23:41	(China) Kuaizhou 1A	Y10	(China) Jiuquan LS-95A		(China) ExPace	
30 August; 23:41	(China) Taiji-1 (KX-09)	CAS	Low Earth (SSO)	Microgravity science Gravitational-wave astronomy	In orbit	Operational
30 August; 23:41	⚀ (China) Xiaoxiang 1-07	Tianyi Research Institute	Low Earth (SSO)	Technology demonstration	In orbit	Operational
← Jan; Feb; Mar; Apr; May; Jun; Jul; Aug; Sep; Oct; Nov; Dec →; === September ===
12 September; 03:26	(China) Long March 4B	4B-Y39	(China) Taiyuan LC-9		(China) CASC	
12 September; 03:26	(China) Ziyuan I-02D	PLA	Low Earth (SSO)	Earth observation	In orbit	Operational
12 September; 03:26	(China) Ice Pathfinder (BNU-1)	Beijing Normal University	Low Earth (SSO)	Earth observation	In orbit	Operational
12 September; 03:26	⚀ (China) Taurus 1 (Jinniuzuo-1)	Shanghai Aerospace Science and Technology	Low Earth (SSO)	Technology demonstration	In orbit	Operational
19 September; 06:42	(China) Long March 11	Y8	(China) Jiuquan LS-95A		(China) CASC	
19 September; 06:42	(China) Zhuhai-1 OHS 3A–3D	Zhuhai Orbita Control Engineering	Low Earth (SSO)	Earth observation	In orbit	Operational
19 September; 06:42	(China) Zhuhai-1 OVS 3A	Zhuhai Orbita Control Engineering	Low Earth (SSO)	Earth observation	In orbit	Operational
22 September; 21:10	(China) Long March 3B / YZ-1	3B-Y65	(China) Xichang LC-2		(China) CASC	
22 September; 21:10	(China) BeiDou-3 M23 (Beidou-47)	CNSA	Medium Earth	Navigation	In orbit	Operational
22 September; 21:10	(China) BeiDou-3 M24 (Beidou-48)	CNSA	Medium Earth	Navigation	In orbit	Operational
24 September; 16:05	(Japan) H-IIB		(Japan) Tanegashima LA-Y2		(Japan) MHI	
24 September; 16:05	(Japan) HTV-8	JAXA	Low Earth (ISS)	ISS logistics	3 November; 02:09	Successful
24 September; 16:05	⚀ (Egypt) NARSSCube-1	NARSS	Low Earth	Technology demonstration	20 December 2021	Successful
24 September; 16:05	⚀ (Japan) AQT-D	University of Tokyo	Low Earth	Technology demonstration	20 April 2022	Successful
24 September; 16:05	⚀ (Rwanda) RWASAT-1	Rwanda Utilities Regulatory Authority	Low Earth	Technology demonstration	27 April 2022	Successful
24 September; 16:05	The first launch attempt on 10 September, 21:33 UTC, was postponed due to a fire on the launch pad. NARSSCube-1, AQT-D, and RWASAT-1 were carried to ISS inside HTV-8 for later deployment into orbit from the ISS. RWASAT-1 was Rwanda's first satellite. The satellites were deployed into orbit from the ISS on 20 November 2019.					
25 September; 00:54	(China) Long March 2D	2D-Y43	(China) Jiuquan SLS-2		(China) CASC	
25 September; 00:54	(China) Yunhai-1 02	SAST	Low Earth (SSO)	Meteorology	In orbit	Spacecraft damaged; operational status uncertain
25 September; 00:54	Struck by a piece of space debris on 18 March 2021, eighteen months after launch. 37 associated pieces of debris have being tracked from the collision. The source of the debris was a piece of the Zenit-2 rocket that launched Tselina-2 in 1996. The satellite appears to have survived the encounter, though its operational status remains uncertain.					
25 September; 13:57:43	(Russia) Soyuz-FG		(Kazakhstan) Baikonur Site 1/5		(Russia) Roscosmos	
25 September; 13:57:43	(Russia) Soyuz MS-15 / 61S	Roscosmos	Low Earth (ISS)	Expedition 61/62	17 April 2020; 05:16	Successful
25 September; 13:57:43	Crewed flight with three cosmonauts. Last flight of Soyuz-FG and last launch from Baikonur Site 1 ("Gagarin's Start"); replaced by Soyuz-2.1a launching from Site 31 for crewed missions starting with Soyuz MS-16 in April 2020.					
26 September; 07:46	(Russia) Soyuz-2.1b / Fregat-M		(Russia) Plesetsk Site 43/4		(Russia) RVSN RF	
26 September; 07:46	(Russia) EKS-3 (Tundra 13L)	VKS	Molniya	Early warning	In orbit	Operational
← Jan; Feb; Mar; Apr; May; Jun; Jul; Aug; Sep; Oct; Nov; Dec →; === October ===
4 October; 18:51	(China) Long March 4C	4C-Y33	(China) Taiyuan LC-9		(China) CASC	
4 October; 18:51	(China) Gaofen 10R	CAST	Low Earth (SSO)	Earth observation	In orbit	Operational
4 October; 18:51	Replacement for the Gaofen 10 satellite lost on 31 August 2016.					
9 October; 10:17	(Russia) Proton-M / Briz-M P4		(Kazakhstan) Baikonur Site 200/39		(Russia) (United States) ILS	
9 October; 10:17	(France) Eutelsat 5 West B	Eutelsat	Geosynchronous	Communications	In orbit	Operational
9 October; 10:17	(United States) MEV-1	Northrop Grumman	Geosynchronous	Satellite servicing	In orbit	Operational
9 October; 10:17	MEV-1 successfully rendezvoused with Intelsat 901 on 25 February 2020. MEV-1 will extend Intelsat 901's operational life by five years through in-orbit station-keeping.					
11 October; 02:00	(United States) Pegasus-XL	F44	(United States) Stargazer, CCAFS Skid Strip		(United States) Northrop Grumman	
11 October; 02:00	(United States) ICON	NASA	Low Earth	Ionospheric research	In orbit	Spacecraft failure
17 October; 01:22	(United States) Electron	"As The Crow Flies"	(New Zealand) Mahia LC-1A		(United States) Rocket Lab	
17 October; 01:22	⚀ (United States) Palisade	Astro Digital	Low Earth (Polar)	Technology demonstration	In orbit	Operational
17 October; 15:21	(China) Long March 3B/E	3B-Y57	(China) Xichang LC-3		(China) CASC	
17 October; 15:21	(China) TJS-4	CNSA	Geosynchronous	Communications; SIGINT	In orbit	Operational
← Jan; Feb; Mar; Apr; May; Jun; Jul; Aug; Sep; Oct; Nov; Dec →; === November ===
2 November; 13:59:47	(United States) Antares 230+		(United States) MARS LP-0A		(United States) Northrop Grumman	
2 November; 13:59:47	(United States) Cygnus NG-12; S.S. Alan Bean	NASA	Low Earth (ISS)	ISS logistics	17 March 2020; 23:00	Successful
2 November; 13:59:47	(United States) STPSat 4	USAF STP	Low Earth	Technology demonstration	4 October 2022	Successful
2 November; 13:59:47	⚀ (United States) AeroCube 14 (IMPACT) × 2	NRO	Low Earth	Technology demonstration	14A: 4 February 2023; 14B: 8 February 2023	Successful
2 November; 13:59:47	⚀ (United States) AeroCube 15 (Rogue) × 2	U.S. Air Force	Low Earth	Technology demonstration	15A: 7 February 2023; 15B: 10 February 2023	Successful
2 November; 13:59:47	⚀ (United States) Argus-02	Saint Louis University	Low Earth	Technology demonstration	6 May 2022	Successful
2 November; 13:59:47	⚀ (United States) HARP	UM	Low Earth	Technology demonstration Atmospheric research	4 April 2022	Successful
2 November; 13:59:47	⚀ (United States) HuskySat-1	University of Washington	Low Earth	Technology demonstration	12 Apr 2023	Successful
2 November; 13:59:47	⚀ (United States) Orbital Factory 2	University of Texas	Low Earth	Technology demonstration	20 March 2023	Successful
2 November; 13:59:47	⚀ (United States) Phoenix	Arizona State University	Low Earth	Technology demonstration	12 June 2022	Successful
2 November; 13:59:47	⚀ (United States) RadSat-u	Montana State University	Low Earth	Technology demonstration	30 April 2022	Successful
2 November; 13:59:47	⚀ (United States) SOCRATES	University of Minnesota	Low Earth	Technology demonstration	2022	Successful
2 November; 13:59:47	⚀ (United States) SwampSat II	University of Florida	Low Earth	Technology demonstration	19 October 2021	Successful
2 November; 13:59:47	First CRS-2 mission for Cygnus. The ELaNa 25A mission launched on this resupply flight. STPSat-4 was deployed into orbit from ISS on 29 January 2020. AeroCube 14 × 2, AeroCube 15 × 2, HuskySat-1, SwampSat-II, and Orbital Factory 2 were deployed into orbit from Cygnus NG-12 after it departed from the ISS. RadSat-U, Phoenix, SOCRATES, HARP, and Argus-02 were deployed into orbit from the ISS on 19 February 2020.					
3 November; 03:22:39	(China) Long March 4B	4B-Y38	(China) Taiyuan LC-9		(China) CASC	
3 November; 03:22:39	(China) Gaofen 7	Ministry of Natural Resources	Low Earth (SSO)	Earth observation	In orbit	Operational
3 November; 03:22:39	(China) Huangpu-1 (Jingzhi-1)	SAST	Low Earth (SSO)	Earth observation Technology demonstration	In orbit	Operational
3 November; 03:22:39	Sudan Remote Sensing Satellite 1 (SRSS-1)	Sudan	Low Earth (SSO)	Earth observation Technology demonstration	In orbit	Operational
3 November; 03:22:39	⚀ (China) Xiaoxiang 1-08 / Tianyi 15 / Dianfeng	Tianyi Research Institute	Low Earth (SSO)	Technology demonstration	25 April 2023	Successful
3 November; 03:22:39	Xiaoxiang 1-08 carries the first propulsion system in space using solid iodine as propellant (cold gas thruster) developed by a French start-up. Test of grid fins towards development of reusable boosters for Long March 8. SRSS-1, Sudan's first satellite developed and built by Chinese satellite manufacturer, Shenzhen Aerospace Oriental Red Sea Satellite Co., was launched as a rideshare on this mission.					
4 November; 17:43	(China) Long March 3B/E	3B-Y61	(China) Xichang LC-2		(China) CASC	
4 November; 17:43	(China) BeiDou-3 I3Q	CNSA	IGSO	Navigation	In orbit	Operational
11 November; 14:56	(United States) Falcon 9 Block 5	Starlink V1.0-L1	(United States) Cape Canaveral SLC-40		(United States) SpaceX	
11 November; 14:56	(United States) Starlink × 60	SpaceX	Low Earth	Communications	In orbit	Operational
11 November; 14:56	First operational Starlink mission, launching the first 60 Starlink v1.0 satellites. The booster was flown for the 4th time. First launch of Starlink Group 1 Satellites.					
13 November; 03:40	(China) Kuaizhou 1A	Y11	(China) Jiuquan LS-95A		(China) ExPace	
13 November; 03:40	(China) Jilin-1 Gaofen-02A	Chang Guang Satellite Technology	Low Earth (SSO)	Earth observation	In orbit	Operational
13 November; 06:35	(China) Long March 6	Y4	(China) Taiyuan LC-16		(China) CASC	
13 November; 06:35	(China) Ningxia-1 (Zhongzi) × 5	Ningxia Jingui Information Technology	Low Earth	Earth observation	In orbit	Operational
17 November; 10:00	(China) Kuaizhou 1A	Y7	(China) Jiuquan LS-95A		(China) ExPace	
17 November; 10:00	(Germany) KL-Alpha A	KLEO Connect	Low Earth	Technology demonstration	In orbit	Operational
17 November; 10:00	(Germany) KL-Alpha B	KLEO Connect	Low Earth	Technology demonstration	In orbit	Operational
17 November; 10:00	The two satellites are part of an international cooperative commercial project between the Innovation Academy for Microsatellites of the Chinese Academy of Sciences (CAS) and KLEO Connect. KL-Alpha A and B are the first commercial satellites built by a Chinese satellite construction organization for a foreign company.					
23 November; 00:55	(China) Long March 3B / YZ-1	3B-Y66	(China) Xichang LC-3		(China) CASC	
23 November; 00:55	(China) BeiDou-3 M21	CNSA	Medium Earth	Navigation	In orbit	Operational
23 November; 00:55	(China) BeiDou-3 M22	CNSA	Medium Earth	Navigation	In orbit	Operational
25 November; 17:52	(Russia) Soyuz-2-1v / Volga		(Russia) Plesetsk Site 43/4		(Russia) RVSN RF	
25 November; 17:52	(Russia) Kosmos 2542	Ministry of Defence	Low Earth (SSO)	Satellite inspection	24 October 2023; 10:07	Successful
25 November; 17:52	(Russia) Kosmos 2543	Ministry of Defence	Low Earth (SSO)	Satellite inspection ASAT test	In orbit	Operational
25 November; 17:52	Kosmos 2542, the main satellite, deployed a small inspector sub-satellite, Kosmos 2543, on 6 December. Kosmos 2543 deployed an even smaller sub-satellite at a high velocity on 15 July 2020, an event that U.S. military officials characterized as a test of a space-based anti-satellite weapon.					
26 November; 21:23	(France) Ariane 5 ECA	VA250	(France) Kourou ELA-3		(France) Arianespace	
26 November; 21:23	(United Kingdom) Inmarsat-5 F5 (GX5)	Inmarsat	Geosynchronous	Communications	In orbit	Operational
26 November; 21:23	(Egypt) TIBA 1	Egypt	Geosynchronous	Communications	In orbit	Operational
27 November; 03:58	(India) PSLV-XL	C47	(India) Satish Dhawan SLP		(India) ISRO	
27 November; 03:58	(India) Cartosat-3	ISRO	Low Earth (SSO)	Earth observation	In orbit	Operational
27 November; 03:58	⚀ (United States) Flock-4p × 12	Planet Labs	Low Earth (SSO)	Earth observation	In orbit	Operational
27 November; 03:58	⚀ (United States) Meshbed	Analytical Space Inc.	Low Earth (SSO)	Technology demonstration	2 May 2023	Successful
27 November; 23:52	(China) Long March 4C	4C-Y24	(China) Taiyuan LC-9		(China) CASC	
27 November; 23:52	(China) Gaofen 12	Ministry of Agriculture and Rural Affairs	Low Earth (SSO)	Earth observation	In orbit	Operational
← Jan; Feb; Mar; Apr; May; Jun; Jul; Aug; Sep; Oct; Nov; Dec →; === December ===
5 December; 17:29	(United States) Falcon 9 Block 5	F9-076	(United States) Cape Canaveral SLC-40		(United States) SpaceX	
5 December; 17:29	(United States) SpaceX CRS-19	NASA	Low Earth (ISS)	ISS logistics	7 January 2020	Successful
5 December; 17:29	⚀ (Mexico) (United States) AzTechSat-1	UPAEP / NASA	Low Earth	Technology demonstration	10 December 2021	Successful
5 December; 17:29	⚀ (United States) CIRiS	USU	Low Earth	Technology demonstration	14 March 2023	Successful
5 December; 17:29	⚀ (United States) CryoCube 1	NASA	Low Earth	Technology demonstration	23 November 2021	Successful
5 December; 17:29	⚀ (United States) EdgeCube	SSU	Low Earth	Technology demonstration	25 October 2022	Successful
5 December; 17:29	⚀ (United States) MakerSat-1	NNU	Low Earth	Technology demonstration	29 October 2022	Successful
5 December; 17:29	⚀ (United States) MiniCarb (CNGB)	LLNL / GSFC	Low Earth	Technology demonstration	In orbit	Operational
5 December; 17:29	⚀ (United States) ORCA-2	DARPA	Low Earth	Technology demonstration	In orbit	Operational
5 December; 17:29	⚀ (United States) ORCA-8	DARPA	Low Earth	Technology demonstration	8 August 2022	Successful
5 December; 17:29	⚀ (Belgium) QARMAN	Von Karman Institute	Low Earth	Technology demonstration	6 February 2022	Successful
5 December; 17:29	⚀ (United States) SORTIE	ASTRA LLC	Low Earth	Technology demonstration	18 September 2022	Successful
5 December; 17:29	⚀ (United States) VPM	AFRL	Low Earth	Magnetospheric research	29 September 2022	Successful
5 December; 17:29	The ELaNa 25B and 28 missions were launched on this resupply flight. EdgeCube, CIRiS, MakerSat-1, VPM, ORCA-2, ORCA-8 and MiniCarb were deployed from Cygnus NG-12 after its departure from the ISS. AzTechSat-1, CryoCube 1, SORTIE, and QARMAN were deployed from the ISS on 19 February 2020.					
6 December; 08:18	(United States) Electron	"Running Out Of Fingers"	(New Zealand) Mahia LC-1A		(United States) Rocket Lab	
6 December; 08:18	(Japan) ALE-2	Astro Live Experiences	Low Earth (SSO)	Artificial meteor shower	In orbit	Spacecraft failure
6 December; 08:18	▫ (Hungary) ATL 1	BME	Low Earth (SSO)	Technology demonstration	11 October 2020	Successful
6 December; 08:18	▫ (Spain) FossaSat 1	Fossa Systems	Low Earth (SSO)	Technology demonstration	28 October 2020	Successful
6 December; 08:18	▫ (United States) NOOR 1A (Unicorn 2B)	Stara Space	Low Earth (SSO)	Technology demonstration	29 December 2020	Successful
6 December; 08:18	▫ (United States) NOOR 1B (Unicorn 2C)	Stara Space	Low Earth (SSO)	Technology demonstration	7 April 2020	Successful
6 December; 08:18	▫ (Hungary) SMOG-P	BME University	Low Earth (SSO)	Technology demonstration	28 September 2020	Successful
6 December; 08:18	▫ (Germany) TRSI Sat	ACME AtronOmatic	Low Earth (SSO)	Technology demonstration	9 October 2020	Successful
6 December; 08:18	Launched ALE-2 and six PocketQubes forming Alba Cluster 2 for Alba Orbital. Tested reusability technologies on the first stage following stage separation and reentry.					
6 December; 09:34:11	(Russia) Soyuz-2.1a		(Kazakhstan) Baikonur Site 31/6		(Russia) Roscosmos	
6 December; 09:34:11	(Russia) Progress MS-13 / 74P	Roscosmos	Low Earth (ISS)	ISS logistics	8 July 2020	Successful
7 December; 02:55	(China) Kuaizhou 1A	Y2	(China) Taiyuan Mobile Launch Platform		(China) ExPace	
7 December; 02:55	(China) Jilin-1 Gaofen-02B	Chang Guang Satellite Technology	Low Earth (SSO)	Earth observation	In orbit	Operational
7 December; 08:52	(China) Kuaizhou 1A	Y12	(China) Taiyuan LC-16		(China) ExPace	
7 December; 08:52	(China) HEAD-2A	HEAD Aerospace	Low Earth (SSO)	AIS ship tracking	In orbit	Operational
7 December; 08:52	(China) HEAD-2B	HEAD Aerospace	Low Earth (SSO)	AIS ship tracking	In orbit	Operational
7 December; 08:52	⚀ (China) Tianqi-4A	Guodian Gaoke	Low Earth (SSO)	IoT	In orbit	Operational
7 December; 08:52	⚀ (China) Tianqi-4B	Guodian Gaoke	Low Earth (SSO)	IoT	In orbit	Operational
7 December; 08:52	⚀ (China) Tianyi 16	Spacety Aerospace	Low Earth (SSO)	Earth observation	In orbit	Operational
7 December; 08:52	⚀ (China) Tianyi 17	Spacety Aerospace	Low Earth (SSO)	Earth observation	In orbit	Operational
11 December; 08:54:48	(Russia) Soyuz-2.1b / Fregat-M		(Russia) Plesetsk Site 43/3		(Russia) RVSN RF	
11 December; 08:54:48	(Russia) GLONASS-M 759	VKS	Medium Earth	Navigation	In orbit	Operational
11 December; 09:55	(India) PSLV-QL	C48	(India) Satish Dhawan FLP		(India) ISRO	
11 December; 09:55	(India) RISAT-2BR1	ISRO	Low Earth	Earth observation Reconnaissance	In orbit	Operational
11 December; 09:55	(Japan) Izanagi (QPS-SAR 1)	iQPS	Low Earth	Earth observation	In orbit	Operational
11 December; 09:55	⚀ (United States) 1HOPSAT TD	Hera Systems	Low Earth	Earth observation Technology demonstration	In orbit	Operational
11 December; 09:55	⚀ (Israel) Duchifat-3	Herzliya Science Center	Low Earth	Earth observation Education	In orbit	Operational
11 December; 09:55	⚀ (United States) Lemur-2 × 4	Spire Global	Low Earth	Earth observation	In orbit	Operational
11 December; 09:55	⚀ (Israel) NANOVA / COMMTRAIL (Tyvak 92)	Elbit Systems	Low Earth	Search and rescue	In orbit	Operational
11 December; 09:55	⚀ (United States) Pathfinder Risk Reduction (Tyvak 129)	Tyvak	Low Earth	Technology demonstration	In orbit	Operational
11 December; 09:55	50th PSLV launch.					
16 December; 07:22	(China) Long March 3B / YZ-1	3B-Y67	(China) Xichang LC-3		(China) CASC	
16 December; 07:22	(China) BeiDou-3 M19	CNSA	Medium Earth	Navigation	In orbit	Operational
16 December; 07:22	(China) BeiDou-3 M20	CNSA	Medium Earth	Navigation	In orbit	Operational
17 December; 00:10	(United States) Falcon 9 Block 5	F9-077	(United States) Cape Canaveral SLC-40		(United States) SpaceX	
17 December; 00:10	(Japan) (Singapore) JCSAT-18 / Kacific 1	JSAT / Kacific	Geosynchronous	Communications	In orbit	Operational
18 December; 08:54:20	(Russia) Soyuz ST-A / Fregat-M	VS23	(France) Kourou ELS		(France) Arianespace	
18 December; 08:54:20	CHEOPS	ESA	Low Earth (SSO)	Space telescope Exoplanetary science	In orbit	Operational
18 December; 08:54:20	(Italy) COSMO-SkyMed (CSG) 1	ASI	Low Earth (SSO)	Earth observation (radar)	In orbit	Operational
18 December; 08:54:20	⚀ (France) ANGELS	CNES	Low Earth (SSO)	Technology demonstration	In orbit	Operational
18 December; 08:54:20	⚀ (France) EyeSat	CNES	Low Earth (SSO)	Astronomy	In orbit	Operational
18 December; 08:54:20	⚀ OPS-SAT	ESA	Low Earth (SSO)	Technology demonstration	In orbit	Operational
20 December; 03:22:29	(China) Long March 4B	4B-Y44	(China) Taiyuan LC-9		(China) CASC	
20 December; 03:22:29	(China) (Brazil) CBERS 4A / Ziyuan I-04A	CASC / INPE	Low Earth (SSO)	Earth observation	In orbit	Operational
20 December; 03:22:29	(Ethiopia) ETRSS-1	ESSTI	Low Earth (SSO)	Earth observation	In orbit	Operational
20 December; 03:22:29	(China) Gemini-1 01 (Yuheng)	NUDT	Low Earth (SSO)	Technology demonstration	In orbit	Operational
20 December; 03:22:29	(China) Gemini-1 02 (Shuntian)	NUDT	Low Earth (SSO)	Technology demonstration	In orbit	Operational
20 December; 03:22:29	(China) Tianqin 1	Sun Yat-sen University	Low Earth (SSO)	Gravitational-wave astronomy	In orbit	Operational
20 December; 03:22:29	(China) Tianyan 01 / Yizheng-1	Jiangsu Satellite Technology Services	Low Earth (SSO)	Earth observation	In orbit	Operational
20 December; 03:22:29	(China) Weilai 1R / Future 1R	China Central Television	Low Earth (SSO)	Earth observation	In orbit	Operational
20 December; 03:22:29	⚀ (Brazil) FloripaSat-1	UFSC	Low Earth (SSO)	Technology demonstration	In orbit	Operational
20 December; 03:22:29	⚀ (China) Tianyan 02 / Xingshidai-8	ADASpace	Low Earth (SSO)	Earth observation	In orbit	Operational
20 December; 03:22:29	ETRSS-1 is the first Ethiopian satellite, which was developed in collaboration between Ethiopian Space Science and Technology Institute and China Academy of Space Technology, with $6 million pledged by China to provide grant and training covering the satellite's $8 million development cost.					
20 December; 11:36:43	(United States) Atlas V N22	AV-080	(United States) Cape Canaveral SLC-41		(United States) ULA	
20 December; 11:36:43	(United States) Starliner Boe-OFT	Boeing / NASA	Low Earth (ISS)	Flight test / ISS logistics	22 December 2019; 12:58	Spacecraft anomaly, recovered successfully
20 December; 11:36:43	Boeing Orbital Flight Test of CST-100 Starliner as part of Commercial Crew Development program. Approach to ISS aborted after achieving orbit due to error in Mission-Elapsed Timer on the spacecraft, resulting in an anomalous orbital injection. Spacecraft landed at White Sands Missile Range on 22 December 2019 after two days in space.					
24 December; 12:03	(Russia) Proton-M / DM-03		(Kazakhstan) Baikonur Site 81/24		(Russia) Roscosmos	
24 December; 12:03	(Russia) Elektro-L No.3	Roscosmos	Geosynchronous	Meteorology	In orbit	Operational
26 December; 23:11:57	(Russia) Rokot / Briz-KM		(Russia) Plesetsk Site 133/3		(Russia) RVSN RF	
26 December; 23:11:57	(Russia) Gonets-M 14	Gonets Satellite System	Low Earth	Communications	In orbit	Operational
26 December; 23:11:57	(Russia) Gonets-M 15	Gonets Satellite System	Low Earth	Communications	In orbit	Operational
26 December; 23:11:57	(Russia) Gonets-M 16	Gonets Satellite System	Low Earth	Communications	In orbit	Operational
26 December; 23:11:57	(Russia) BLITS-M	Roscosmos	Low Earth	Laser ranging	10 April 2020	Payload separation failure
26 December; 23:11:57	Final flight of Rokot. BLITS-M failed to separate from the upper stage.					
27 December; 12:45	(China) Long March 5	Y3	(China) Wenchang LC-1		(China) CASC	
27 December; 12:45	(China) Shijian 20	CAST	Geosynchronous	Communications	In orbit	Operational
27 December; 12:45	Long March 5 return-to-flight mission following the July 2017 launch failure.					

- ← Jan
- Feb
- Mar
- Apr
- May
- Jun
- Jul
- Aug
- Sep
- Oct
- Nov
- Dec →

== Suborbital flights ==
Date and time (UTC)	Rocket	Flight number	Launch site		LSP	
Date and time (UTC)	Payload (⚀ = CubeSat)	Operator	Orbit	Function	Decay (UTC)	Outcome
Date and time (UTC)	Remarks					
2 July; 11:00	(United States) Orion Abort Test Booster		(United States) Cape Canaveral SLC-46		(United States) NASA	
2 July; 11:00	(United States) Orion Ascent Abort-2	NASA	Suborbital	Test flight	2 July	Successful
2 July; 11:00	In-flight abort test under the highest aerodynamic loads. A specific booster repurposed from a LGM-118 Peacekeeper missile was used in this mission.					
24 July	(Iran) Shahab-3		Iran		(Iran) IRGC	
24 July		IRGC	Suborbital	Missile test	24 July	Successful
24 July	Apogee: ~150 kilometres (93 mi)					
26 July	(Russia) RS-12M Topol		(Russia) Kapustin Yar		(Russia) RVSN	
26 July		RVSN	Suborbital	Missile test	26 July	Successful
26 July ?	(United States) eMRBM ?		(United States) C-17, Pacific Ocean ?		(United States) MDA	
26 July ?	(United States) (Israel) FTA-01	MDA	Suborbital	Arrow III target	26 July ?	Successful
26 July ?	Apogee: 300 kilometres (190 mi), the FTA-01 exercise saw three US Missile Defense Agency medium range targets of undisclosed type launched from an undisclosed location on undisclosed dates in July, all intercepted by Israeli Arrow 3 interceptors launched from Kodiak, Alaska.					
26 July ?	(Israel) Arrow III		(United States) Kodiak		(Israel) IAF / (United States) MDA	
26 July ?	(United States) (Israel) FTA-01	MDA/IDF	Suborbital	ABM test	26 July ?	Successful
26 July ?	Intercepted target missile, apogee: 100 kilometres (62 mi)					
26 July ?	(United States) eMRBM ?		(United States) C-17, Pacific Ocean ?		(United States) MDA	
26 July ?	(United States) (Israel) FTA-01	MDA	Suborbital	Arrow III target	26 July ?	Successful
26 July ?	Apogee: 300 kilometres (190 mi), successful intercepted					
26 July ?	(Israel) Arrow III		(United States) Kodiak		(Israel) IAF / (United States) MDA	
26 July ?	(United States) (Israel) FTA-01	MDA/IDF	Suborbital	ABM test	26 July ?	Successful
26 July ?	Intercepted target missile, apogee: 100 kilometres (62 mi)					
26 July ?	(United States) eMRBM ?		(United States) C-17, Pacific Ocean ?		(United States) MDA	
26 July ?	(United States) (Israel) FTA-01	MDA	Suborbital	Arrow III target	26 July ?	Successful
26 July ?	Apogee: 300 kilometres (190 mi), successful intercepted					
26 July ?	(Israel) Arrow III		(United States) Kodiak		(Israel) IAF / (United States) MDA	
26 July ?	(United States) (Israel) FTA-01	MDA/IDF	Suborbital	ABM test	26 July ?	Successful
26 July ?	Intercepted target missile, apogee: 100 kilometres (62 mi)					
27 July; 07:20	(Japan) Momo 4		(Japan) Taiki Aerospace Research Field		(Japan) Interstellar Technologies	
27 July; 07:20	(Japan)	Kochi University of Technology	Suborbital	Infrasound propagation measurement	27 July	Launch failure
27 July; 07:20	The rocket suffered an early engine shutdown and only reached 13 kilometres (8.1 mi) altitude.					
11 August; 06:07	(Canada) Black Brant IX		(United States) White Sands Missile Range		(United States) NASA	
11 August; 06:07	(United States) SISTINE	University of Colorado	Suborbital	UV Astronomy	11 August	Successful
11 August; 06:07	Apogee: 259 km (161 mi).					
12 August; 09:44	(United States) Terrier-Improved Malemute		(United States) Wallops Flight Facility		(United States) NASA	
12 August; 09:44	(United States) RockSat-X	NASA	Suborbital	Student experiments	12 August	Successful
12 August; 09:44	Apogee: 154 kilometres (96 mi)					
24 August	(Russia) R-29RMU Sineva		(Russia) K-114 Tula, near North Pole		(Russia) VMF	
24 August		VMF	Suborbital	Missile test	24 August	Successful
24 August	(Russia) RSM-56 Bulava		(Russia) K-535 Yury Dolgorukiy, Barents Sea		(Russia) VMF	
24 August		VMF	Suborbital	Missile test	24 August	Successful
30 August	(United States) eMRBM ?	FTT-23	(United States) C-17, Pacific Ocean		(United States) MDA	
30 August	(United States)	MDA	Suborbital	ABM target	30 August	Successful
30 August	Apogee: 300 kilometres (190 mi), successfully intercepted					
30 August	(United States) THAAD	FTT-23	(United States) Ronald Reagan Ballistic Missile Defense Test Site		(United States) US Army	
30 August	(United States)	US Army/MDA	Suborbital	ABM test	30 August	Successful
30 August	Intercepted target missile, apogee: 100 kilometres (62 mi)					
4 September	(United States) UGM-133 Trident II		(United States) USS Nebraska (SSBN-739), Pacific Missile Range Facility		(United States) US Navy	
4 September		US Navy	Suborbital	Missile test	4 September	Successful
4 September	Commander Evaluation Test (CET)					
4 September	(United States) UGM-133 Trident II		(United States) USS Nebraska (SSBN-739), Pacific Missile Range Facility		(United States) US Navy	
4 September		US Navy	Suborbital	Missile test	4 September	Successful
4 September	Commander Evaluation Test (CET)					
6 September	(United States) UGM-133 Trident II		(United States) USS Nebraska (SSBN-739), Pacific Missile Range Facility		(United States) US Navy	
6 September		US Navy	Suborbital	Missile test	6 September	Successful
6 September	Commander Evaluation Test (CET)					
6 September	(United States) UGM-133 Trident II		(United States) USS Nebraska (SSBN-739), Pacific Missile Range Facility		(United States) US Navy	
6 September		US Navy	Suborbital	Missile test	6 September	Successful
6 September	Commander Evaluation Test (CET)					
18 September; 09:30 ?	(Canada) Black Brant IX		(United States) Wallops Flight Facility		(United States) NASA	
18 September; 09:30 ?	(United States)	DoD	Suborbital	Technology demonstration	18 September	Successful
18 September; 09:30 ?	Apogee: 200 kilometres (120 mi)					
30 September; 18:04	(Canada) Black Brant IX		(United States) White Sands Missile Range		(United States) NASA	
30 September; 18:04	(United States) ESIS	Montana State University	Suborbital	Solar research	30 September	Successful
30 September; 18:04	Apogee: 246 kilometres (153 mi)					
30 September	(Russia) RS-12M Topol		(Russia) Plesetsk		(Russia) RVSN	
30 September		RVSN	Suborbital	Missile test	30 September	Successful
1 October; 10:00	(North Korea) Pukguksong-3		(North Korea) Yonghung Bay, Kangwon Province		(North Korea) Korean People's Army	
1 October; 10:00	(North Korea)	Korean People's Army	Suborbital	Missile test	1 October	Successful
1 October; 10:00	Apogee: 910 kilometres (570 mi).					
2 October; 08:13	(United States) Minuteman-III		(United States) Vandenberg Air Force Base LF-10		(United States) US Air Force	
2 October; 08:13		US Air Force	Suborbital	Test flight	2 October	Successful
7 October; 15:00	(Canada) Black Brant IX		(United States) White Sands Missile Range		(United States) NASA	
7 October; 15:00	(United States) DUST	GSFC	Suborbital	Physics	7 October	Successful
7 October; 15:00	Apogee: 338 kilometres (210 mi)					
17 October	(United States) Black Dagger		(United States) Fort Wingate		(United States) SMDC	
17 October	(United States)	SMDC	Suborbital	Missile test	17 October	Successful
17 October	(Russia) RS-24 Yars		(Russia) Plesetsk		(Russia) RVSN	
17 October		RVSN	Suborbital	Missile test	17 October	Successful
17 October	(Russia) R-29RMU Sineva		(Russia) K-18 Karelia, Barents Sea		(Russia) VMF	
17 October		VMF	Suborbital	Missile test	17 October	Successful
17 October	(Russia) R-29R Volna		(Russia) K-44 Ryazan, Sea of Okhotsk		(Russia) VMF	
17 October		VMF	Suborbital	Missile test	17 October	Successful
25 October; 00:00	(United States) Terrier-Improved Malemute		(United States) Wallops Flight Facility		(United States) NASA	
25 October; 00:00	(United States) SubTec-8	NASA	Suborbital	Technology demonstration	25 October	Successful
25 October; 00:00	Apogee: 209 kilometres (130 mi)					
26 October; 17:42	(United States) SARGE		(United States) Spaceport America, New Mexico		(United States) Exos Aerospace	
26 October; 17:42	SARGE M1	Exos Aerospace	Suborbital	Microgravity Research	26 October	Launch failure
26 October; 17:42	Fourth launch of the SARGE suborbital launch vehicle, it carried several small research payloads. The rocket lost control of attitude seconds after launch. Several pieces of debris felt back to the ground, and the rocket body crashed near the launch pad nearly three and a half minutes after liftoff. The rocket reached a peak altitude of about 12.6 kilometres (7.8 mi), far short of the planned altitude of at least 80 kilometres (50 mi).					
28 October; 04:30	(Canada) Black Brant IX		(United States) White Sands Missile Range		(United States) NASA	
28 October; 04:30	(United States) FORTIS-4	JHU	Suborbital	UV Astronomy	28 October	Successful
28 October; 04:30	Apogee: 261 kilometres (162 mi). Payload: Experimental FORTIS (Far-ultraviolet Off Rowland-circle Telescope for Imaging and Spectroscopy) telescope and Next-Generation Microshutter Array (NGMSA). Studied the way gas is being ejected by supernovae from galaxy M33. The goal is to understand matter recycling between stellar generations of the galaxy. Experiment was successful.					
30 October; 14:57	(Russia) RSM-56 Bulava		(Russia) K-549 Knyaz Vladimir, White Sea		(Russia) VMF	
30 October; 14:57		VMF	Suborbital	Missile test	30 October	Successful
4 November; 14:15	(United States) Starliner launch abort engines		(United States) White Sands Missile Range		(United States) Boeing	
4 November; 14:15	(United States) Starliner	Boeing	Suborbital	Emergency escape systems test; pad-abort test	4 November	Successful
4 November; 14:15	Apogee: 1,349 meters (4,426 ft)					
15 November; 09:35	(Brazil) VSB-30		(Sweden) Esrange		(Europe) EuroLaunch	
15 November; 09:35	(Germany) TEXUS-56	DLR / ESA	Suborbital	Microgravity	15 November	Successful
15 November; 09:35	Apogee: 256 kilometres (159 mi)					
16 November; 14:02	(India) Agni II		(India) Integrated Test Range		(India) Indian Army / DRDO	
16 November; 14:02		Indian Army/DRDO	Suborbital	Missile test	16 November	Successful
22 November; 15:19	(United States) SpaceLoft XL		(United States) Spaceport America		(United States) UP Aerospace	
22 November; 15:19	(United States) FOP-7, ADS-B experiment	NASA	Suborbital	Technology experiments	22 November	Successful
22 November; 15:19	Mission SL-14, Apogee: 92 kilometres (57 mi)					
26 November; 07:43	(United States) Terrier-Improved Malemute		(Norway) Ny-Ålesund		(United States) NASA	
26 November; 07:43	(United States) (Norway) ICI-5	NASA/Oslo/Andøya	Suborbital	Ionosphere research	26 November	Partial failure
26 November; 07:43	Apogee: 253 kilometres (157 mi), the rocket experienced a roll rate anomaly, precluding the instruments from functioning as intended.					
28 November	(Russia) RS-12M Topol		(Russia) Kapustin Yar		(Russia) RVSN	
28 November		RVSN	Suborbital	Missile test	28 November	Successful
30 November; 13:50	(India) Agni-III		(India) ITR IC-4		(India) Indian Army	
30 November; 13:50		Indian Army	Suborbital	Missile test	30 November	Launch failure
30 November; 13:50	The maiden night trial of the Agni-III was conducted. The missile reportedly started diverging from its planned flight trajectory after traveling a distance of 115 kilometers. This caused the mission control to subsequently abort the flight. A manufacturing defect is thought to be the potential cause of the failure.					
10 December; 09:30	(Canada) Black Brant IX		(Norway) Ny-Ålesund		(United States) NASA	
10 December; 09:30	(United States) CHI	Clemson	Suborbital	Ionosphere research	10 December	Successful
10 December; 09:30	Apogee: 360 kilometres (220 mi)					
11 December; 17:53	(United States) New Shepard	NS-12	(United States) Corn Ranch		(United States) Blue Origin	
11 December; 17:53	(United States) Crew Capsule 2.0	Blue Origin	Suborbital	Test flight/Payload delivery	11 December	Successful
11 December; 17:53	(United Arab Emirates) (Australia) (Austria) (Canada) (Germany) (France) (United Kingdom) (Croatia) (Indonesia) (India) (Malaysia) (New Zealand) (Philippines) (Romania) (Russia) (Slovakia) (Sweden) (United States) (Venezuela) (South Africa) Postcards	Club For The Future	Suborbital	Education	11 December	Successful
11 December; 17:53	Peak altitude 104.5 kilometers. Took a number of research and educational payloads to space. Sixth flight for the propulsion module+capsule combination. Both the propulsion module and capsule landed successfully. A Croatian postcard was the first payload from Croatia to be sent into space.					
12 December; 16:30	(United States) IRBM		(United States) Vandenberg Air Force Base TP-01		(United States) US Air Force	
12 December; 16:30		US Air Force	Suborbital	Test flight	12 December	Successful
23 December; 00:50	(China) Tianxing 1	Y2	(China)		(China) Space Transportation	
23 December; 00:50	(China)	Space Transportation	Suborbital	Flight test	23 December	Successful
23 December; 00:50	Test flight of the Tianxing 1 suborbital spaceplane.					
