= Raavana 1 =

Sri Lankan research satellite

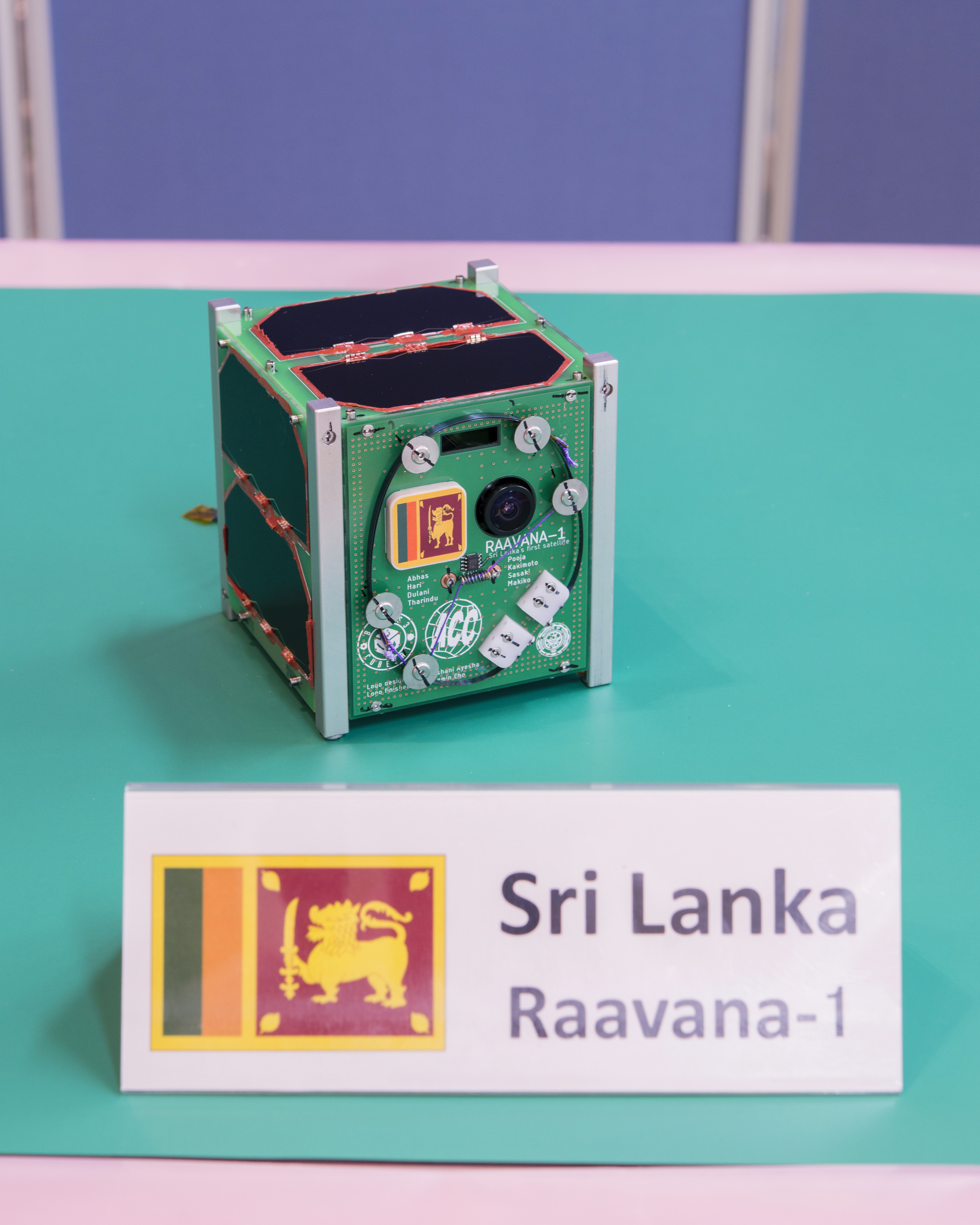
- Mission type: Space engineering
- Operator: Arthur C. Clarke Institute for Modern Technologies
- COSPAR ID: 1998-067QF
- SATCAT no.: 44330

Spacecraft properties
- Manufacturer: Kyushu Institute of Technology, Japan
- Launch mass: 1.05kg

Start of mission
- Launch date: 17 April 2019, 20:46 UTC
- Rocket: Antares 230
- Launch site: Wallops Pad 0A
- Contractor: Northrop Grumman

End of mission
- Disposal: Reentered
- Decay date: 3 October 2021

Raavana-1 was the first Sri Lankan satellite. The CubeSat-sized satellite was launched as part of the Cygnus NG-11 mission to the ISS on 17 April 2019. On 17 June 2019, the satellite was deployed into orbit from the ISS.

== Development ==
The research satellite was developed by Tharindu Dayarathna and Dulani Chamika Vithanage, scholars of Peradeniya University's Engineering Faculty and Asian Institute of Technology. The satellite was designed in Japan. It had a volume of about 1000 cubic centimeters and a mass of about 1.1 kg. The lifespan of the satellite was about one and a half years.

The satellite took images of Sri Lanka and other countries near Sri Lanka. It used magnetic torquers to reduce its angular velocity.

== Origin of the name ==
When naming the country's first satellite, Sanath Panaavanna, Director General and Engineer at the Center for New Technology - Arthur C. Clarke Institute of Sri Lanka, along with his two engineering students, wanted to put forward an authentic name that represents Sri Lankan culture and history. Inevitably the name "Dadu Monara" ("දඬු මොණරය" in Sinhala) was a go-to choice. Dadu Monara is a flying device that appears in early Sri Lankan folklore, and it is often accredited by historians to be the first aircraft ever created. However, due to the complexity of the word and the difficulty most non-native Sri Lankans would have with pronouncing this word, it was named after mythical King Ravana (Sinhala: රාවණ රජතුමා Ravana Rajathuma), who is said to have ruled Sri Lanka at the time the Dadhu Monara was built. King Raavana is a notable King in Sri Lankan mythology with many mythical stories in ancient Sri Lanka.

== Launch ==
The satellite was handed over to Japan Aerospace Exploration Agency (JAXA) on 18 February, and the satellite was sent to the International Space Station on 17 April at 2:16 a.m. Sri Lanka Standard Time, to be deployed from it later. The satellite was launched along with Nepal's first satellite, NepaliSat-1. The satellite orbited at an altitude of 400 kilometers and had five missions to complete. Raavana 1 was included in a third batch of satellites known as BIRDS-3 together with satellites from Nepal and Japan. Raavana 1 aimed to take fifteen pictures per day.

=== Mission ===
According to Nanosats' database, its missions were to "provide ciphered short messages in its beacon in the 437 MHz band. Remote Data Collection based on low-powered LoRa modulation for demonstration of remote data collection and processing onboard. Imaging mission for public outreach and awareness, Earth Magnetic Field measurement, Glue Mission: to find COTS alternative to expensive space glue, and Active Attitude Stabilization as precursor to active pointing control for future CubeSat"

=== Specifications ===
Section source

- Country: Sri Lanka
- Type: CubeSat, 1U
- Organisation: Kyushu Institute of Technology
- Oneliner: Remote Data Collection based on low powered LoRa modulation for demonstration.

== See also ==
- 2019 in Sri Lanka
- NepaliSat-1
