= NepaliSat-1 =

Nepal's first satellite

- Mission type: Space engineering
- Operator: KIT / NAST
- COSPAR ID: 1998-067QE
- SATCAT no.: 44329

Spacecraft properties
- Launch mass: 1.3kg

Start of mission
- Launch date: 20:46, 17 April 2019 (UTC)
- Rocket: Antares 230
- Launch site: Wallops Pad 0A
- Contractor: Northrop Grumman
- Deployed from: International Space Station

End of mission
- Disposal: Reentered
- Decay date: 4 October 2021

NepaliSat-1, also known as Bird NPL, was a Nepalese low orbit research satellite and the first satellite of Nepal. Along with a Sri Lankan satellite, Raavana 1, it was launched as part of Cygnus NG-11 by the United States on 17 April 2019. It reached the International Space Station on 19 April 2019, to be deployed later, and was estimated to revolve the Earth for six months.

== Background ==
The nanosatellite was developed by two Nepalese scientists Aabhas Maskey and Hariram Shrestha, both of whom were at the time studying at Japanese Kyushu Institute of Technology. Aabhas Maskey, a PhD candidate in space engineering was the project manager of the Birds-3 project and he involved himself in this project. The satellite had a mass of 1.3 kg and it was funded by the Nepal Academy of Science and Technology while it was constructed under the BIRDS-3 project of the Japanese Kyushu Institute of Technology. The main mission of Birds Program was to support countries who have never sent a satellite to space. The development of the satellite cost nearly twenty million Nepalese rupee. The satellite contained Nepal's flag and Nepal Academy of Science and Technology (NAST) logo, alongside the developers name.

== Satellite launch ==
The satellite was launched on 18 April 2019 at 02:31 am (Nepal Standard Time) from Virginia. The satellite was orbiting at an altitude of about 400 kilometres. The satellite took pictures of Nepal to provide geographical information to the country. Suresh Kumar Dhungel said to The Kathmandu Post: "The satellite will remain in the Earth’s orbit for a year during which the satellite will be closely studied" and "Since it is a learning phase, the study of the satellite will help us in developing more advanced satellites in the future."

=== Reception ===
Prime minister of Nepal Khadga Prasad Oli congratulated the scientists via Twitter by writing, "Though a humble beginning, with the launching of NepaliSat-1 Nepal has entered the Space-Era. I wish to congratulate all those scientists and institutions that were involved right from the development to its launching thereby enhancing the prestige of our country." Suresh Kumar Dhungel, spokesman for Nepal Academy of Science and Technology (NAST), said, "...they invested in the satellite in a bid to open new paths for space engineering in the country."

== Specifications ==
Section source

=== NepaliSat-1 ===
- Country: Nepal
- Type: CubeSat
- Type: 1U
- Project Name: Birds-3
- Organisation: University
- Organisation: Kyushu Institute of Technology
- Oneliner: Remote Data Collection based on low powered LoRa modulation for demonstration.

== See also ==
- 2019 in Nepal
- 2019 in spaceflight
- Nepal PQ-1
- NAST
- NESRA
