= BRICSat-2 =

Experimental amateur radio satellite

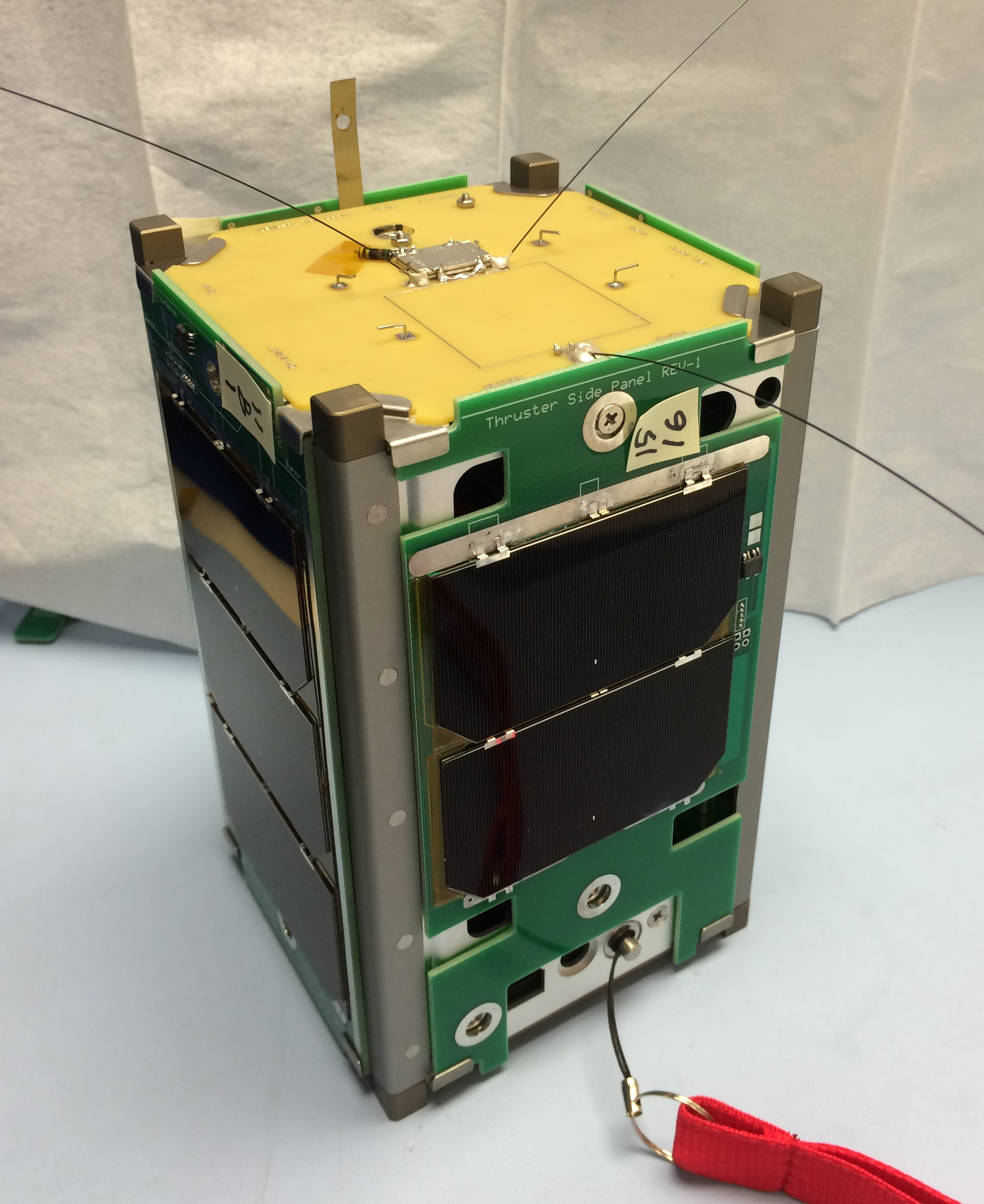
- Mission type: Communications
- Operator: U.S. Navy
- COSPAR ID: 2019-036S
- SATCAT no.: 44355

Spacecraft properties
- Bus: 1.5U Cubesat
- Manufacturer: George Washington University
- Launch mass: 1 kg (2.2 lb)

Start of mission
- Launch date: 25 June 2019, 06:30 UTC
- Rocket: Falcon Heavy
- Launch site: Kennedy LC-39A
- Contractor: SpaceX

End of mission
- Decay date: 20 April 2022

Orbital parameters
- Reference system: Geocentric
- Regime: Low Earth
- Semi-major axis: 6,925 kilometres (4,303 mi)
- Perigee altitude: 310.4 kilometres (192.9 mi)
- Apogee altitude: 799.0 kilometres (496.5 mi)
- Inclination: 28.5323°
- Period: 95.6 minutes
- Mean motion: 15.06277419
- Epoch: 7 April 2020

Transponders
- Band: FM

BRICSat-2 (Ballistically Reinforced Communication Satellite 2), or USNAP1, was an experimental amateur radio satellite from the United States Naval Academy that was developed in collaboration with George Washington University. BRICSat-2 was the successor to BRICSat-P. AMSAT North America's OSCAR number administrator assigned number 103 to this satellite; in the amateur radio community it was therefore called Navy-OSCAR 103, short NO-103.

== Mission ==
BRICSat-2 was launched on June 25, 2019 with a Falcon Heavy from Kennedy Space Center, Florida, United States, as part of Mission STP-2 (Space Test Program 2) as one of 24 satellites.

== Frequencies ==
- 145.825 MHz - Uplink APRS digital repeater, 1200 bd
- 145.825 MHz - Downlink APRS digital repeater
- 437.605 MHz - Telemetry, 9600 bd (callsign USNAP14)

== See also ==
- OSCAR
