= Exos Aerospace =

American Aerospace Company

EXOS Aerospace Systems & Technologies, Inc
- Type: Privately held
- Industry: Aerospace
- Predecessor: Armadillo Aerospace
- Founded: 2014
- Headquarters: Greenville, Texas
- Key people: David Mitchell – President; John Quinn – CEO; Russell Blink – CTO
- Products: Rocket vehicles
- Revenue: Not disclosed
- Number of employees: 12 (2020)
- Website: www.exosaero.com

Exos Aerospace Systems & Technologies is an aerospace manufacturer and developer of reusable launch systems intended to support uncrewed orbital spaceflight launches, and is based in Caddo Mills, Texas.

== History ==
Exos Aerospace is based on both technologies and people from Armadillo Aerospace, a company founded by video game developer John Carmack. Armadillo had competed for the Ansari X Prize for commercial human suborbital spaceflight in the early 2000s and later developed a series of suborbital vehicles. In August 2013, Carmack placed Armadillo in "hibernation" following the crash of their STIG-B rocket and began "actively looking for outside investors to restart work on the company’s rockets".

Exos Aerospace was founded in May 2014; former employees of Armadillo Aerospace were a significant part of the founding team. Exos was created to carry on the reusable commercial spacecraft started by Armadillo Aerospace. Exos even set up its operations in one of Armadillo's former facilities at the Caddo Mills Municipal Airport, in Texas. In 2015, the assets of Armadillo Aerospace were formally sold to Exos Aerospace.

== Operations ==
Exos Aerospace is focused on suborbital research rockets with an intent of initially launching micro satellites and eventually progressing to autonomous spaceflight. Exos Aerospace is developing the SARGE family for its suborbital vehicles. All research and development is based at the new manufacturing facility in Greenville, Texas. This is inclusive of rocket design, fabrication, assembly, storage, and testing. Engines up to 5,000-lbf nominal thrust can be tested on a static test skid at the hangar complex. The company is a NASA REDDI provider and is targeting to qualify to be a NASA IDIQ provider under the Flight Opportunities program.

== SARGE ==
The SARGE (aka SARGE M1), an acronym for Suborbital Autonomous Rocket with GuidancE, is a suborbital rocket based on the STIG-B rocket platform developed as part of Armadillo Aerospace's lunar lander program. The SARGE vehicle employs a LOX-ethanol propulsion module based on the LE23000FC series engines, producing approximately 5500 lbs of thrust. The airframe is a reusable sounding rocket with a 20 inches (51 cm) diameter and is 36 feet (11 m) tall. Pressurized helium cold gas thrusters provide attitude control for pitch-roll-yaw and pointing capability. Payload must fit inside a 20 inches (51 cm) diameter cylinder, be no more than 36 inches (91 cm) tall (in its standard configuration), and weigh no more than 50 kilograms (110 lb). Exos plans to use this technology as the design basis for a reusable (first stage) launch vehicle capable of carrying 100 kg to low Earth orbit.

The SARGE suborbital sounding rocket is designed to be reusable. As of 27 October 2019, no SARGE rocket had reached its intended suborbital altitude. However, the same rocket was launched four times between 2018 and 2019, demonstrating its reusability.

EXOS Aerospace operates from Spaceport America in New Mexico. On 14 February 2018, the Federal Aviation Administration issued Exos Aerospace a Reusable Vehicle Mission Launch License.

=== Launches ===
First

On 25 August 2018, Exos flew an unsuccessful Pathfinder Mission, proving SARGE as a reusable launch vehicle. Due to a malfunction of an onboard GPS receiver, the flight was terminated with an engine shutdown prematurely. The rocket reached an altitude of 28 km (planned altitude was 80 km).

Second

On 2 March 2019, SARGE's second launch took place. Due to winds, the flight reached an altitude of 20 km (planned altitude was 80 km). It carried several small research payloads.

Third

On 29 June 2019, at 18:00 UTC, Exos Aerospace conducted a SARGE launch at the Spaceport America in New Mexico. Despite the flight failing seconds after launch due to loss of control, the company recovered the rocket intact. This marked SARGE's third flight, with previous flights in August 2018 and March 2019. The previous flights also suffered failures that prevented the rocket from reaching the planned altitude.

The third flight carried educational, research, and technology demonstration payloads for nine customers. Among them were a biomedical experiment from the Mayo Clinic and a dust aggregation experiment from the University of Central Florida. While the payloads' official status remained unknown, they were presumably recovered intact.

Fourth

On 26 October 2019, at 17:42 UTC, the company conducted its fourth flight, which also failed because the rocket suffered multiple defects and began malfunctioning already during the launch phase. First, the rocket lost control of attitude seconds after launch. Second, the rocket appears to have disintegrated to some degree as several pieces of debris fell back to the ground. Third, the launch vehicle separated from the drogue. Rather than land softly as it had on previous flights, it returned uncontrolled and at high speed. The rocket body crashed near the launch pad nearly three and a half minutes after liftoff. Live footage seems to indicate the nose cone was properly returning under a parachute canopy. The rocket reached a peak altitude of about 12.6 kilometres (7.8 mi), far short of the planned altitude of at least 80 kilometers. The flight carried several small research payloads.

Exos Aerospace determined that the fourth flight experienced a structural failure. They plan to build a second SARGE rocket to continue flying. (They have built only one; the same rocket was used on all four launches in 2018–2019.)
