= Spire Global =

Space-to-cloud data and analytics company

Spire Global, Inc.
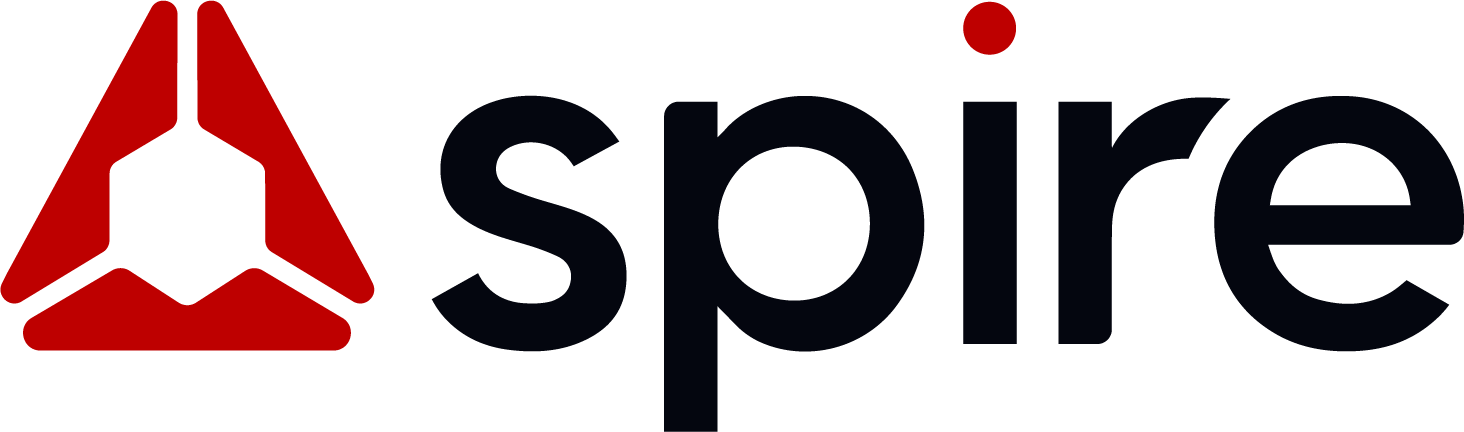
- Type: Public
- Traded as: NYSE: SPIR
- Industry: Data & Analytics, Aerospace
- Founded: 2012
- Founder: Peter Platzer, Joel Spark, Jeroen Cappaert
- Headquarters: San Francisco, California, U.S.
- Number of locations: 8 (2022)
- Area served: Worldwide
- Key people: Peter Platzer (Executive Chairman)
- Products: Spire Sense Cloud (Satellite and Terrestrial AIS Data) Spire AirSafe (Satellite ADS-B Data) Spire Stratos (GPS-RO Data) Spire Forecast (NWP) Orbital Services
- Services: Satellite-based maritime, aviation, and weather tracking
- Revenue: ▼US$71.6 million (2025)
- Net income: ▲US$51.3 million (2025)
- Number of employees: 424
- Divisions: spire.com/maritime/ spire.com/weather/ spire.com/aviation/ spire.com/space-services/ spire.com/federal/
- Website: spire.com

Spire Global, Inc. is a space-to-cloud data and analytics company that specializes in the tracking of global data sets powered by a large constellation of nanosatellites, such as the tracking of maritime, aviation and weather patterns.

The company currently operates a fleet of more than 110 CubeSats, the second largest commercial constellation by number of satellites, and the largest by number of sensors. The satellites are integrally designed and built in-house. It has launched more than 140 satellites to orbit since its creation.

The company has offices in San Francisco, Boulder, Washington, D.C., Glasgow, Luxembourg, Munich, Singapore, and Cambridge (Ontario).

== History ==
=== Early years ===
Spire was originally known as NanoSatisfi Inc. NanoSatisfi was founded in June 2012 in San Francisco by International Space University graduates Peter Platzer, Jeroen Cappaert and Joel Spark as part of ArduSat, a project aiming to “democratize access to space”. Tests for early prototypes were conducted over the summer and the fall through a high-altitude balloon. This effort was partly financed through crowdfunding, with a KickStarter that raised Spire $106,330. In November the company signed an agreement with NanoRacks for the deployment of two satellites in what was to become “the first U.S. Commercial Satellite Deployment from the International Space Station”.

In order to raise the capital required for the manufacturing of those satellites, the company incubated with Lemnos Labs. It raised investments totaling $1.5M in a seed round by Shasta Ventures, Lemnos Labs, E-merge, Grishin Robotics, and Beamonte Investments in February 2013. A year after signing with NanoRacks, on November 19, 2013, both ArduSat-1 and ArduSat-X (1U CubeSats) were successfully released from the Kibo Experiment Module of the International Space Station and quickly started transmitting data to Spire servers.

Following this experimentation, Spire engineers opted to focus on 3U nanosatellites to start porting more complex payloads, launching the first iteration of its standard satellite format, Lemur-1, with the Dnepr rocket in June 2014, transiting from 1U to 3U in only seven months, and launching its first prototype just two years after incorporation.

On the basis of this early success, Spire announced in July a follow-up $25M Series A funding round led by RRE Ventures and backed by Emerge, Mitsui & Co. Global Investment, and Mousse Partners. The following month, the company announced that ArduSat would be spun-off of the company and would focus exclusively on educational technology in partnership with U.S. high schools. Shortly after, Spire opened its Singapore office in late 2014 and started steadily increasing its network of ground stations.

=== Growth ===
On June 30, 2015, the company announced a $40 Million Series B led by Promus Ventures with participation from Bessemer Venture Partners and Jump Capital. in order to help finance the first batches of Lemur satellites. The first Lemur-2 were launched in September 2015 through the Polar Satellite Launch Vehicle-XL, making Spire the first US-based operator to launch from India. This launch inaugurated the Spire tradition to leave the naming of each satellite to employees, with the first 3 Lemurs christened respectively Joel, Peter and Jeroen after the company's co-founders.

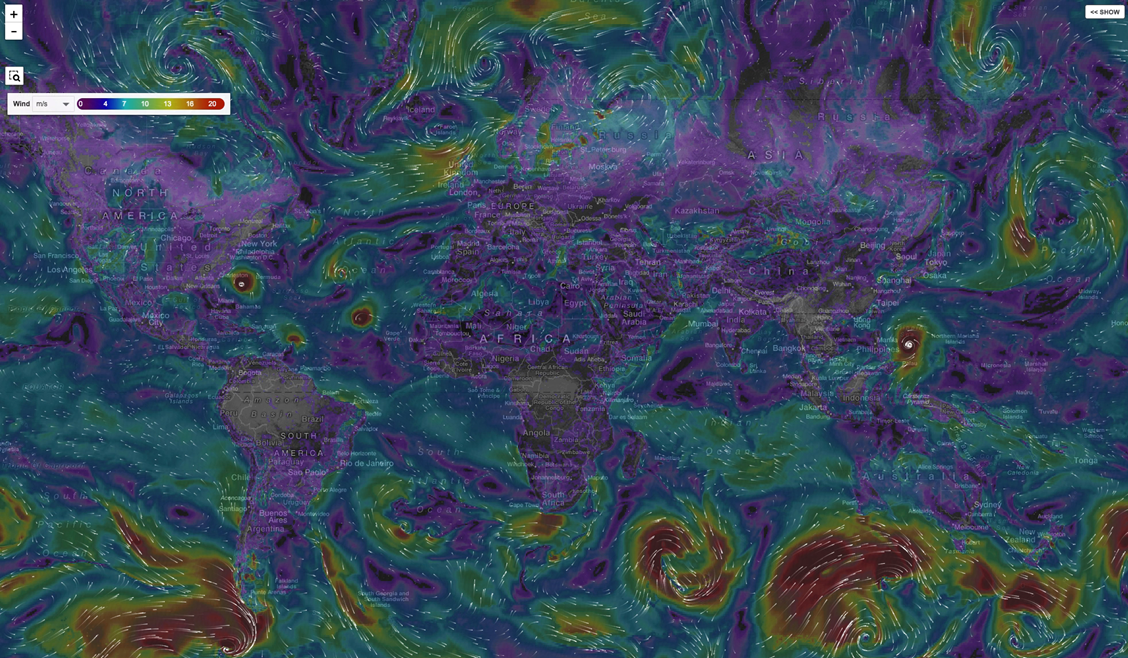
A visualization of Spire Global's Weather Model

Facing increasing pressure to mass-produce satellites and constrained by the limited space in its San Francisco office, Spire opened an office in Glasgow in February 2015, initially leveraging Clyde Space's facilities, before opening its own full-fledged cleanroom for satellite manufacturing in December 2015. The city was chosen to leverage the local know-how of what is widely considered the leading European ecosystem in small satellite production and establish a first foothold in Europe. These facilities enabled Spire to quickly produce a first batch of four nanosatellites (launched in September) before manufacturing a full eight Lemur satellites ahead of an Atlas V launch in March 2016. This launch saw Spire cross the line of 10 simultaneously operating satellites in June of that year, following deployment from the ISS. Two additional launches were conducted that year, putting the total satellites sent to space by the company that year at sixteen, confirming its ability to industrialize the manufacturing process of its nanosatellites.

Concomitantly, Spire opened a second U.S. campus in Boulder, Colorado, in January 2016. The company hired Dave Ector – the former program manager for NASA’s COSMIC satellites – and Alexander MacDonald – former director of NOAA’s Earth System Research Laboratory – and started drawing on the resources of the local weather ecosystem (powered by the University of Colorado Boulder) to kickstart its weather program in the city. To this effect, the team started working on Spire's own Global Navigation Satellite System Radio Occultation (GNSS-RO) payload, enabling the company to constantly collect highly accurate data on local atmospheric properties which greatly enhance the forecasting abilities of weather models. This program quickly enabled Spire to participate in the inaugural Commercial Weather Data Pilot program of the U.S. National Oceanographic and Atmospheric Administration in September 2016. Spire's participation was confirmed and broadened in September 2018 for the second round of the CWDP program. This program aims to enable weather-focused administrations to procure data (largely obtained from Radio Occultation profiles) created by private entities in order to improve the precision of the publicly available weather models.

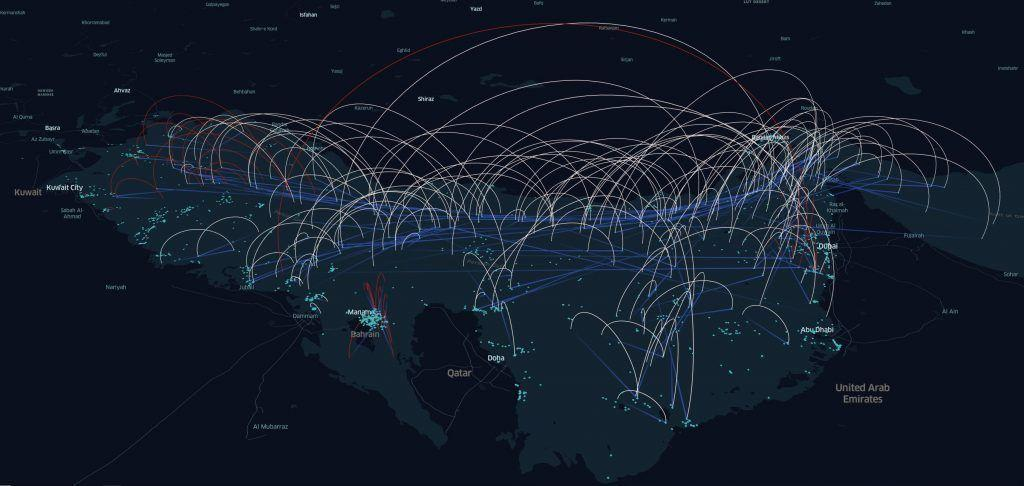
A visualization of Spire Maritime's AIS archive over the Persian Gulf

Over 2017, the company launched 6 missions, yielding an additional 36 operated satellites despite the critical failure of a Soyuz vehicle carrying 10 Lemurs in November. Spire closed the year by completing a $70m Series C led by the Government of Luxembourg (through its national Luxembourg Future Fund), and opened its second European campus in the city, enabling the company's access to regional talent and facilities. This round put the total amount of capital raised by Spire at $140.5m.

In early 2018, Spire participated in the second flight of Rocket Lab’s Electron rocket, and was selected for Arianespace’s Vega Proof of Concept, further broadening its launch portfolio. It participated in a total of 7 launch missions – yielding 28 new operated satellites – and developed its own ADS-B payload able to track the movement of equipped airplanes across areas that conventional ground radars can not cover, and that is quickly becoming a standard following the MH370 disappearance.

In 2019, the company formalized its first business unit as Spire Maritime, based in Luxembourg, and launched its 100th Lemur satellite on April 1.

On March 1, 2021, the company announced an agreement to go public via a merger with the SPAC (special-purpose acquisition company) Navsight. The merger, completed in the third quarter of 2021, valued the company at $1.6 billion.

Spire's stock began trading in New York stock exchange on August 17, 2021. Spire had a market value of $1.6 billion and about $265 million in cash on its books after the close of the SPAC merger. In the year before, 2020, Spire had booked $36 million in revenue. Also at the time of stock market debut, the company had more than 110 satellites in orbit and ground stations in 16 countries, with more than 70 antennas on its ground stations. At the time, Spire did not expect to grow its constellation of Lemur satellites, as the company did not see “any customer demand” that would require a larger constellation of satellites. Despite not growing its constellation, Spire would continue to build and launch satellites as the Lemur satellites are refreshed on a three-year hardware replacement cycle. When listing in the stock exchange Spire had offices in four countries: the U.S., the U.K., Luxembourg and Singapore and customers in nearly 30 countries.

Due to missing projected revenue targets and rising losses, Spire's market value started falling after the first quarterly report. As of April 30, 2022, the company had a market cap of $231 million, less than half of the $557 million in capital invested in the company, and less than the cash on its books after the close of the SPAC merger.

On 13 November 2024, Spire Global announced the selling of its ship-tracking (AIS tracking) business to Kpler of Belgium for $241 million. Kpler gets the exclusive rights to all ship tracking data from Spire's satellites. Spire retains ownership of its satellites, infrastructure, and technology so Spire is selling only the ship-tracking data portion of its business. US government clients of Spire's maritime business remain clients of Spire and do not become clients of the Belgian company Kpler. The proceeds of the trade are expected to shore up Spire's troubled financials. The proceeds might be used to cover Spire's $100 million debt.

== Satellites ==
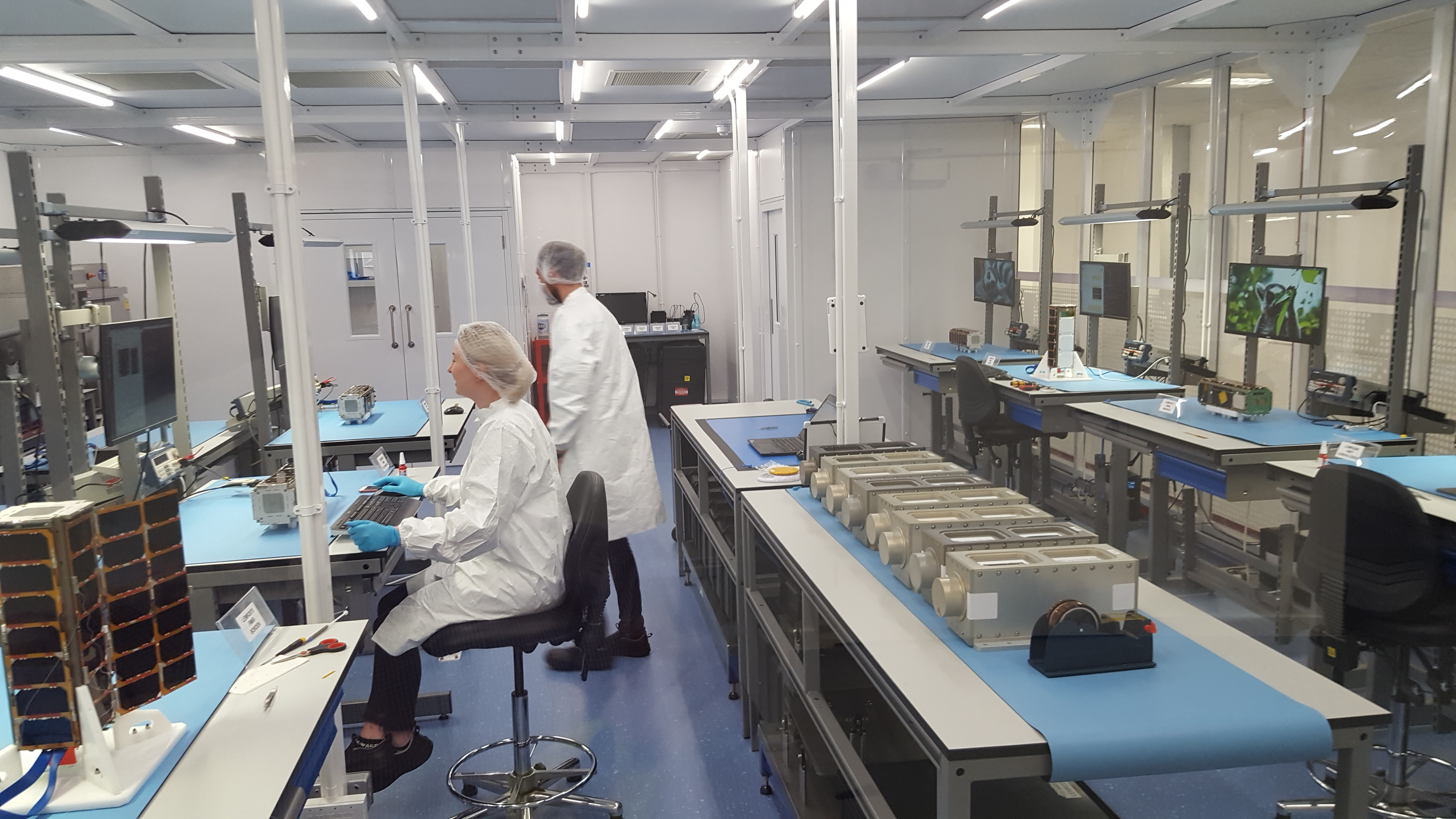
Spire engineers assemble a batch of Lemur satellites

Spire's Lemur satellites are flexible platforms built to operate a variety of in-house or hosted payloads. It currently commercializes its platform on a “Space-as-a-Service” offering with aerospace and defence customers.

Spire designs, builds, tests, and operates all its satellites in-house at its Glasgow offices. The company uses minimally adapted COTS electronics to reduce cost. The satellites are placed in low Earth orbit and are scheduled to be retired and replaced every two to three years.

Spire adheres to internationally recognized guidelines for disposal of old satellites.

The company's satellites are multi-sensor. Data types such as Automatic Identification System (AIS) service are used for tracking sea vessels. This data is valuable for use in illegal fishing, trade monitoring, maritime domain awareness, insurance, asset tracking, search and rescue, and prevention of piracy, among others. Spire's Sense product leveraging the company's AIS data set was officially launched in February 2019.

The GNSS-RO weather payload measure temperature, pressure, among other key characteristics across a “slice” of the atmosphere, or "profile". These characteristics are highly valuable for public and private weather forecasters across the world as they strongly increase the forecasting capabilities of weather models.

ADS-B sensors were launched in 2018 to permanently track aircraft across all skies. This data is getting increasingly regarded as the new standard for modern aviation as it enables air controllers and companies to constantly monitor aircraft across isolated areas and oceans which ground-based radars are not able to cover.

In 2020, Spire announced its intention to add intersatellite links to its satellites, allowing for lower latency between data collection and delivery to a gateway site.

== List of satellites ==
Satellite List
NORAD CAT ID	Satellite Name	Launch Date	Launch Vehicle	Site	De-Orbit Date
40044	LEMUR 1	2014-06-19	Dnepr	Yasny	
40932	LEMUR 2 JOEL	2015-09-28	PSLV-XL	Satish Dhawan	
40933	LEMUR 2 CHRIS	2015-09-28	PSLV-XL	Satish Dhawan	
40934	LEMUR 2 JEROEN	2015-09-28	PSLV-XL	Satish Dhawan	
40935	LEMUR 2 PETER	2015-09-28	PSLV-XL	Satish Dhawan	
41485	LEMUR 2 THERESACONDOR	2016-03-23	Atlas V 401	Cape Canaveral	2017-03-30
41488	LEMUR 2 NICK-ALLAIN	2016-03-23	Atlas V 401	Cape Canaveral	2017-04-05
41489	LEMUR 2 KANE	2016-03-23	Atlas V 401	Cape Canaveral	2017-04-07
41490	LEMUR 2 JEFF	2016-03-23	Atlas V 401	Cape Canaveral	2017-03-24
41595	LEMUR 2 DRMUZZ	2016-03-23	Atlas V 401	Cape Canaveral	2017-06-25
41596	LEMUR 2 BRIDGEMAN	2016-03-23	Atlas V 401	Cape Canaveral	2017-03-08
41597	LEMUR 2 CUBECHEESE	2016-03-23	Atlas V 401	Cape Canaveral	2017-03-06
41598	LEMUR 2 NATE	2016-03-23	Atlas V 401	Cape Canaveral	2017-02-27
	LEMUR-2 BECCADEWEY	2016-03-23	Atlas V 401	Cape Canaveral	Deploy Failure
41871	LEMUR 2 XIAOQING	2016-10-17	Antares-230	MARS	
41872	LEMUR 2 SOKOLSKY	2016-10-17	Antares-230	MARS	
41873	LEMUR 2 ANUBHAVTHAKUR	2016-10-17	Antares-230	MARS	
41874	LEMUR 2 WINGO	2016-10-17	Antares-230	MARS	
42059	LEMUR 2 REDFERN-GOES	2016-12-09	H-2B	Tanegashima	2018-12-05
42067	LEMUR 2 TRUTNA	2016-12-09	H-2B	Tanegashima	2018-04-15
42068	LEMUR 2 AUSTINTACIOUS	2016-12-09	H-2B	Tanegashima	2018-10-04
42069	LEMUR 2 TRUTNAHD	2016-12-09	H-2B	Tanegashima	2018-11-13
41991	LEMUR 2 SATCHMO	2017-02-15	PSLV-XL	Satish Dhawan	2023-07-11
41992	LEMUR 2 MIA-GRACE	2017-02-15	PSLV-XL	Satish Dhawan	2023-05-17
41993	LEMUR 2 SMITA-SHARAD	2017-02-15	PSLV-XL	Satish Dhawan	2023-11-02
41994	LEMUR 2 SPIRE-MINIONS	2017-02-15	PSLV-XL	Satish Dhawan	2023-05-23
41995	LEMUR 2 RDEATON	2017-02-15	PSLV-XL	Satish Dhawan	2023-11-29
41996	LEMUR 2 NOGUECORREIG	2017-02-15	PSLV-XL	Satish Dhawan	2023-06-06
41997	LEMUR 2 JOBANPUTRA	2017-02-15	PSLV-XL	Satish Dhawan	2023-05-25
41998	LEMUR 2 TACHIKOMA	2017-02-15	PSLV-XL	Satish Dhawan	2023-11-15
42752	LEMUR 2 ANGELA	2017-04-18	Atlas V 401	Cape Canaveral	
42753	LEMUR 2 JENNYBARNA	2017-04-18	Atlas V 401	Cape Canaveral	
42754	LEMUR 2 ROBMOORE	2017-04-18	Atlas V 401	Cape Canaveral	
42755	LEMUR 2 SPIROVISION	2017-04-18	Atlas V 401	Cape Canaveral	
42771	LEMUR 2 SHAINAJOHL	2017-06-23	PSLV-XL	Satish Dhawan	
42772	LEMUR 2 XUENITERENCE	2017-06-23	PSLV-XL	Satish Dhawan	
42773	LEMUR 2 LUCYBRYCE	2017-06-23	PSLV-XL	Satish Dhawan	
42774	LEMUR 2 KUNGFOO	2017-06-23	PSLV-XL	Satish Dhawan	
42779	LEMUR 2 LYNSEY-SYMO	2017-06-23	PSLV-XL	Satish Dhawan	
42780	LEMUR 2 LISASAURUS	2017-06-23	PSLV-XL	Satish Dhawan	
42781	LEMUR 2 SAM-AMELIA	2017-06-23	PSLV-XL	Satish Dhawan	
42782	LEMUR 2 MCPEAKE	2017-06-23	PSLV-XL	Satish Dhawan	
42837	LEMUR 2 GREENBERG	2017-07-14	Soyuz-2.1a	Baikonur	
42838	LEMUR 2 ANDIS	2017-07-14	Soyuz-2.1a	Baikonur	
42839	LEMUR 2 MONSON	2017-07-14	Soyuz-2.1a	Baikonur	
42840	LEMUR 2 FURIAUS	2017-07-14	Soyuz-2.1a	Baikonur	
42841	LEMUR 2 PETERG	2017-07-14	Soyuz-2.1a	Baikonur	
42842	LEMUR 2 DEMBITZ	2017-07-14	Soyuz-2.1a	Baikonur	
42845	LEMUR 2 ZACHARY	2017-07-14	Soyuz-2.1a	Baikonur	
42881	LEMUR 2 ARTFISCHER	2017-07-14	Soyuz-2.1a	Baikonur	
43041	LEMUR 2 ROCKETJONAH	2017-11-12	Antares-230	MARS	
43045	LEMUR 2 YONGLIN	2017-11-12	Antares-230	MARS	
43046	LEMUR 2 KEVIN	2017-11-12	Antares-230	MARS	
43047	LEMUR 2 BRIANDAVIE	2017-11-12	Antares-230	MARS	
43048	LEMUR 2 ROMACOSTE	2017-11-12	Antares-230	MARS	
43051	LEMUR 2 MCCULLAGH	2017-11-12	Antares-230	MARS	
43053	LEMUR 2 DUNLOP	2017-11-12	Antares-230	MARS	
43054	LEMUR 2 LIU-POU-CHUN	2017-11-12	Antares-230	MARS	
	LEMUR-2 MCGARVEY	2017-11-28	Soyuz-2.1b	Vostochny	Launch Failure
	LEMUR-2 BENYEOH	2017-11-28	Soyuz-2.1b	Vostochny	Launch Failure
	LEMUR-2 HARVEY	2017-11-28	Soyuz-2.1b	Vostochny	Launch Failure
	LEMUR-2 MATTHEW	2017-11-28	Soyuz-2.1b	Vostochny	Launch Failure
	LEMUR-2 MAXIMILLIE	2017-11-28	Soyuz-2.1b	Vostochny	Launch Failure
	LEMUR-2 SMILLIE-FACE	2017-11-28	Soyuz-2.1b	Vostochny	Launch Failure
	LEMUR-2 NRE-METTS	2017-11-28	Soyuz-2.1b	Vostochny	Launch Failure
	LEMUR-2 CYLONRAIDER	2017-11-28	Soyuz-2.1b	Vostochny	Launch Failure
	LEMUR-2 ECTOR	2017-11-28	Soyuz-2.1b	Vostochny	Launch Failure
	LEMUR-2 CRAIG	2017-11-28	Soyuz-2.1b	Vostochny	Launch Failure
43123	LEMUR 2 MCCAFFERTY	2018-01-12	PSLV-XL	Satish Dhawan	2023-04-19
43124	LEMUR 2 PETERWEBSTER	2018-01-12	PSLV-XL	Satish Dhawan	2023-05-09
43125	LEMUR 2 BROWNCOW	2018-01-12	PSLV-XL	Satish Dhawan	2023-04-19
43126	LEMUR 2 DAVEWILSON	2018-01-12	PSLV-XL	Satish Dhawan	2023-04-05
43165	LEMUR 2 MARSHALL	2018-01-21	Electron	Mahia	2023-08-22
43167	LEMUR 2 TALLHAMN-ATC	2018-01-21	Electron	Mahia	2023-11-09
43182	LEMUR 2 JIN-LUEN	2018-02-01	Soyuz-2.1a	Vostochny	
43183	LEMUR 2 URAMCHANSOL	2018-02-01	Soyuz-2.1a	Vostochny	
43184	LEMUR 2 KADI	2018-02-01	Soyuz-2.1a	Vostochny	
43185	LEMUR 2 THENICKMOLO	2018-02-01	Soyuz-2.1a	Vostochny	
43558	LEMUR 2 VU	2018-05-21	Antares-230	MARS	2023-02-06
43559	LEMUR 2 ALEXANDER	2018-05-21	Antares-230	MARS	2023-01-13
43560	LEMUR 2 YUASA	2018-05-21	Antares-230	MARS	2023-01-18
43561	LEMUR 2 TOMHENDERSON	2018-05-21	Antares-230	MARS	2023-02-13
43695	LEMUR 2 ZUPANSKI	2018-11-11	Electron	Mahia	2023-10-05
43697	LEMUR 2 CHANUSIAK	2018-11-11	Electron	Mahia	2023-09-06
43731	LEMUR 2 ORZULAK	2018-11-29	PSLV-CA	Satish Dhawan	2023-02-03
43732	LEMUR 2 KOBYSZCZE	2018-11-29	PSLV-CA	Satish Dhawan	2023-02-03
43745	LEMUR 2 DULY	2018-11-29	PSLV-CA	Satish Dhawan	2023-02-20
43746	LEMUR 2 VLADIMIR	2018-11-29	PSLV-CA	Satish Dhawan	2023-01-13
43882	LEMUR 2 CHRISTINAHOLT	2018-12-27	Soyuz-2.1a	Vostochny	2025-02-14
43883	LEMUR 2 TINYKEV	2018-12-27	Soyuz-2.1a	Vostochny	2025-01-11
43884	LEMUR 2 REMY-COLTON	2018-12-27	Soyuz-2.1a	Vostochny	2025-04-15
43885	LEMUR 2 GUSTAVO	2018-12-27	Soyuz-2.1a	Vostochny	2025-04-26
43886	LEMUR 2 ZO	2018-12-27	Soyuz-2.1a	Vostochny	2025-05-13
43887	LEMUR 2 NATALIEMURRAY	2018-12-27	Soyuz-2.1a	Vostochny	2025-04-04
43888	LEMUR 2 SARAHBETTYBOO	2018-12-27	Soyuz-2.1a	Vostochny	2025-03-25
43889	LEMUR 2 DAISY-HARPER	2018-12-27	Soyuz-2.1a	Vostochny	2025-02-25
44084	LEMUR-2 JOHANLORAN	2019-04-01	PSLV-QL	Satish Dhawan	2023-03-07
44085	LEMUR-2 BEAUDACIOUS	2019-04-01	PSLV-QL	Satish Dhawan	2023-06-30
44086	LEMUR-2 ELHAM	2019-04-01	PSLV-QL	Satish Dhawan	2023-05-03
44087	LEMUR-2 VICTOR-ANDREW	2019-04-01	PSLV-QL	Satish Dhawan	2023-03-15
44402	LEMUR 2 WANLI	2019-07-05	Soyuz-2.1b	Vostochny	
44396	LEMUR 2 LILLYJO	2019-07-05	Soyuz-2.1b	Vostochny	
44405	LEMUR 2 DUSTINTHEWIND	2019-07-05	Soyuz-2.1b	Vostochny	
44409	LEMUR 2 EJATTA	2019-07-05	Soyuz-2.1b	Vostochny	
44403	LEMUR 2 MORAG	2019-07-05	Soyuz-2.1b	Vostochny	
44411	LEMUR 2 GREGROBINSON	2019-07-05	Soyuz-2.1b	Vostochny	
44413	LEMUR 2 YNDRD	2019-07-05	Soyuz-2.1b	Vostochny	
44407	LEMUR 2 ALEX-MADDY	2019-07-05	Soyuz-2.1b	Vostochny	
44861	LEMUR 2 PAPPY	2019-12-11	PSLV-QL	Satish Dhawan	
44860	LEMUR 2 HIMOMANDDAD	2019-12-11	PSLV-QL	Satish Dhawan	
44855	LEMUR 2 JPGSQUARED	2019-12-11	PSLV-QL	Satish Dhawan	
44863	LEMUR 2 THEODOSIA	2019-12-11	PSLV-QL	Satish Dhawan	
	LEMUR 2 FJMSRBIJANKA	2020-09-02	Vega	Kourou	
	LEMUR 2 DAVEHARTZELL	2020-09-03	Vega	Kourou	
46298	LEMUR 2 ETHANOAKES	2020-09-03	Vega	Kourou	
46315	LEMUR 2 SCHMIDTFALL	2020-09-03	Vega	Kourou	
46316	LEMUR 2 DJUPROERA	2020-09-03	Vega	Kourou	
46317	LEMUR 2 SQUAREJAWS	2020-09-03	Vega	Kourou	
46299	LEMUR 2 OSCARLATOR	2020-09-03	Vega	Kourou	
46318	LEMUR 2 URSA AVION	2020-09-03	Vega	Kourou	
46502	LEMUR 2 SUSURRUS	2020-09-28	Soyuz-2.1b	Plesetsk	
46500	LEMUR 2 SLICERS	2020-09-28	Soyuz-2.1b	Plesetsk	
46503	LEMUR 2 NICHOL	2020-09-28	Soyuz-2.1b	Plesetsk	
46501	LEMUR 2 DAYWZAGOODDAY	2020-09-28	Soyuz-2.1b	Plesetsk	
46926	LEMUR 2 DJARA	2020-10-03	Antares-230+	MARS	
46925	LEMUR 2 BAXTER-OLIVER	2020-10-03	Antares-230+	MARS	
46908	LEMUR 2 OZARAK	2020-11-07	PSLV-DL	Satish Dhawan	
46909	LEMUR 2 JINDRA	2020-11-07	PSLV-DL	Satish Dhawan	
46910	LEMUR 2 WALLACE	2020-11-07	PSLV-DL	Satish Dhawan	
46911	LEMUR 2 JEREMIAH	2020-11-07	PSLV-DL	Satish Dhawan	
47529	LEMUR 2 CHANTAL	2021-01-24	Falcon 9 Block 5	Cape Canaveral	
47525	LEMUR 2 JENNIFERSONG	2021-01-24	Falcon 9 Block 5	Cape Canaveral	
47457	LEMUR 2 NALLYWACKER	2021-01-24	Falcon 9 Block 5	Cape Canaveral	
47450	LEMUR 2 NEVA	2021-01-24	Falcon 9 Block 5	Cape Canaveral	
47538	LEMUR 2 NOOBNOOB	2021-01-24	Falcon 9 Block 5	Cape Canaveral	
47511	LEMUR 2 RUAIRI-EILIDH	2021-01-24	Falcon 9 Block 5	Cape Canaveral	
47453	LEMUR 2 SAOIRSEDH5GUO	2021-01-24	Falcon 9 Block 5	Cape Canaveral	
47493	LEMUR 2 MANGO1	2021-01-24	Falcon 9 Block 5	Cape Canaveral	
48273	LEMUR 2 SPECIALK	2021-04-29	Vega	Kourou	
48269	LEMUR 2 SVANTE-AMANDA	2021-04-29	Vega	Kourou	
48885	LEMUR 2 JACKSON	2021-06-30	Falcon 9 Block 5	Cape Canaveral	
48923	LEMUR 2 ANNABANANA	2021-06-30	Falcon 9 Block 5	Cape Canaveral	
48925	LEMUR 2 JOHN-TREIRES	2021-06-30	Falcon 9 Block 5	Cape Canaveral	
48927	LEMUR 2 AC-CUBED	2021-06-30	Falcon 9 Block 5	Cape Canaveral	
48929	LEMUR 2 MERIMA	2021-06-30	Falcon 9 Block 5	Cape Canaveral	
48959	LEMUR 2 CARLSANTAMARI	2021-06-30	Falcon 9 Block 5	Cape Canaveral	2023-08-14
51021	LEMUR 2 RAMONAMAE	2022-01-13	Falcon 9 Block 5	Cape Canaveral	2024-05-29
51022	LEMUR 2 KING-JULIEN	2022-01-13	Falcon 9 Block 5	Cape Canaveral	2024-01-19
51036	LEMUR 2 ROHOVITHSA (6U)	2022-01-13	Falcon 9 Block 5	Cape Canaveral	2023-08-03
51054	LEMUR 2 MIRIWARI (6U)	2022-01-13	Falcon 9 Block 5	Cape Canaveral	2024-06-29
51058	LEMUR 2 DJIRANG (6U)	2022-01-13	Falcon 9 Block 5	Cape Canaveral	2024-06-29
51100	LEMUR 2 KRYWE	2022-01-13	LauncherOne	Mojave	2022-01-13
52740	LEMUR 2 HANCOM-1 (6U)	2022-05-25	Falcon 9 Block 5	Cape Canaveral	
52736	LEMUR 2 KAREN B	2022-05-25	Falcon 9 Block 5	Cape Canaveral	
52769	LEMUR 2 MIMI1307	2022-05-25	Falcon 9 Block 5	Cape Canaveral	
52732	LEMUR 2 TENNYSONLILY	2022-05-25	Falcon 9 Block 5	Cape Canaveral	
52733	LEMUR 2 VANDENDRIES	2022-05-25	Falcon 9 Block 5	Cape Canaveral	
55014	LEMUR 2 DISCLAIMER	2023-01-03	Falcon 9 Block 5	Cape Canaveral	
55037	LEMUR 2 EMMACULATE	2023-01-03	Falcon 9 Block 5	Cape Canaveral	
55088	LEMUR 2 FUENTETAYA-01	2023-01-03	Falcon 9 Block 5	Cape Canaveral	
55038	LEMUR 2 MMOLO	2023-01-03	Falcon 9 Block 5	Cape Canaveral	
55013	LEMUR 2 PHILARI	2023-01-03	Falcon 9 Block 5	Cape Canaveral	
55017	LEMUR 2 STEVEALBERS	2023-01-03	Falcon 9 Block 5	Cape Canaveral	
56187	LEMUR 2 SPACEGUS	2023-04-15	Falcon 9 Block 5	Vandenberg	
56182	LEMUR 2 ONREFLECTION (6U)	2023-04-15	Falcon 9 Block 5	Vandenberg	
56206	LEMUR 2 ROMEO-N-LEO	2023-04-15	Falcon 9 Block 5	Vandenberg	
57391	LEMUR 2 DEVERILL-M-T	2023-07-18	Electron	Mahia	
57390	LEMUR 2 MANO	2023-07-18	Electron	Mahia	
57391	LEMUR 2 MANGO2A	2023-11-11	Falcon 9 Block 5	Vandenberg	
57392	LEMUR 2 MANGO2B	2023-11-11	Falcon 9 Block 5	Vandenberg	
57393	LEMUR 2 NANAZ	2023-11-11	Falcon 9 Block 5	Vandenberg	
	LEMUR 2 (Skylark)	2024-01-31	Electron	Mahia	
	LEMUR 2 (Skylark)	2024-01-31	Electron	Mahia	
	LEMUR 2 (Skylark)	2024-01-31	Electron	Mahia	
	LEMUR 2 (Skylark)	2024-01-31	Electron	Mahia	
59115	LEMUR 2 CHARLIE-ROSE	2024-03-04	Falcon 9 Block 5	Vandenberg	2024-12-14
59116	LEMUR 2 FELDHUS	2024-03-04	Falcon 9 Block 5	Vandenberg	2024-12-17
59146	LEMUR 2 JOHNNYTROUNG (Hubble 1)	2024-03-04	Falcon 9 Block 5	Vandenberg	
59147	LEMUR 2 ROCINANTE (Hubble 2)	2024-03-04	Falcon 9 Block 5	Vandenberg	2026-01-26
60417	LEMUR 2 TOMATOKECHUP (Hubble 3)	2024-08-16	Falcon 9 Block 5	Vandenberg	
60533	LEMUR 2 STELLA	2024-08-16	Falcon 9 Block 5	Vandenberg	
60536	LEMUR 2 MARHISYAM	2024-08-16	Falcon 9 Block 5	Vandenberg	
60577	LEMUR 2 LLOYD	2024-08-16	Falcon 9 Block 5	Vandenberg	
60579	LEMUR 2 SIERRINI	2024-08-16	Falcon 9 Block 5	Vandenberg	
60578	LEMUR 2 SQUIRRELCOMM	2024-08-16	Falcon 9 Block 5	Vandenberg	
60576	LEMUR 2 AHMED-ASRAR	2024-08-16	Falcon 9 Block 5	Vandenberg	
62706	LEMUR 2 ALISIA	2025-01-14	Falcon 9 Block 5	Vandenberg	
62699	LEMUR 2 ARIANNA	2025-01-14	Falcon 9 Block 5	Vandenberg	
62712	LEMUR 2 MYNAMEISJEFF	2025-01-14	Falcon 9 Block 5	Vandenberg	
62711	LEMUR 2 ROUNDTRIPPER	2025-01-14	Falcon 9 Block 5	Vandenberg	
62696	LEMUR 2 STAR-FOX	2025-01-14	Falcon 9 Block 5	Vandenberg	
62694	LEMUR 2 WILSON	2025-01-14	Falcon 9 Block 5	Vandenberg	
63246	LEMUR 2 LEIA-PHILIP	2025-03-15	Falcon 9 Block 5	Vandenberg	
63248	LEMUR 2 LIA-MARTIN	2025-03-15	Falcon 9 Block 5	Vandenberg	
63259	LEMUR 2 DELOITTE-1	2025-03-15	Falcon 9 Block 5	Vandenberg	
63261	LEMUR 2 EMERSONROSE	2025-03-15	Falcon 9 Block 5	Vandenberg	
63262	LEMUR 2 MARACHE-FRAN	2025-03-15	Falcon 9 Block 5	Vandenberg	
63264	LEMUR 2 THEFALCONER	2025-03-15	Falcon 9 Block 5	Vandenberg	
	LEMUR 2 ??	2025-03-15	Falcon 9 Block 5	Vandenberg	
63351	LEMUR 2 UNTITLED-SC (OTC P1-1)	2025-03-26	Electron	Mahia	
63352	LEMUR 2 ESPERANZA (OTC P1-2)	2025-03-26	Electron	Mahia	
63353	LEMUR 2 KREMPEL-BRO2 (OTC P1-3)	2025-03-26	Electron	Mahia	
63354	LEMUR 2 THERMORAPTOR (OTC P1-4)	2025-03-26	Electron	Mahia	
63355	LEMUR 2 NEUROSPICY (OTC P1-5)	2025-03-26	Electron	Mahia	
63356	LEMUR 2 TILLINFINITY (OTC P1-6)	2025-03-26	Electron	Mahia	
63357	LEMUR 2 KREMPEL-BRO1 (OTC P1-7)	2025-03-26	Electron	Mahia	
63358	LEMUR 2 LANGER2SPACE (OTC P1-8)	2025-03-26	Electron	Mahia	
64565	LEMUR 2 HUBBLE-4	2025-06-23	Falcon 9 Block 5	Vandenberg	
64840	LEMUR 2 HUBBLE-5	2025-06-23	Falcon 9 Block 5	Vandenberg	
64841	LEMUR 2 KARENDARRELL (LacunaSat-4A)	2025-06-23	Falcon 9 Block 5	Vandenberg	
65403	LEMUR 2 LUCILLE-ROSE (LacunaSat-4B)	2025-06-23	Falcon 9 Block 5	Vandenberg	
64561	LEMUR 2 KRISH	2025-06-23	Falcon 9 Block 5	Vandenberg	
64586	LEMUR 2 SEJONG-2	2025-06-23	Falcon 9 Block 5	Vandenberg	

== See also ==
- Planet Labs
- Kepler Communications
