= 2019 in spaceflight =

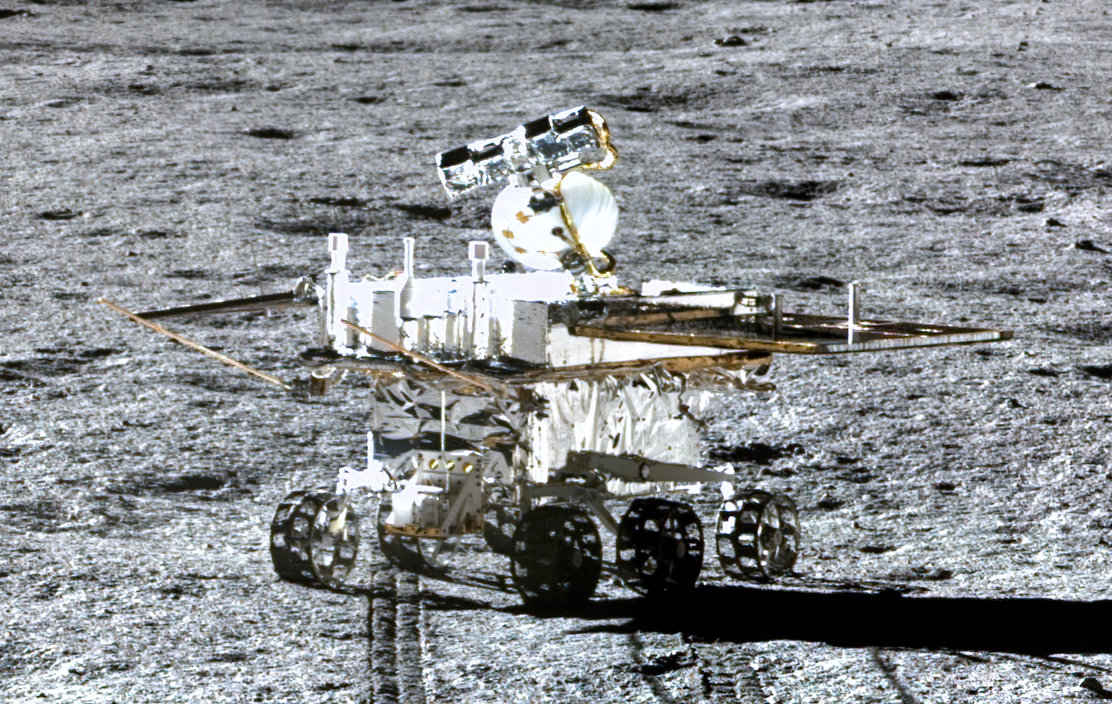
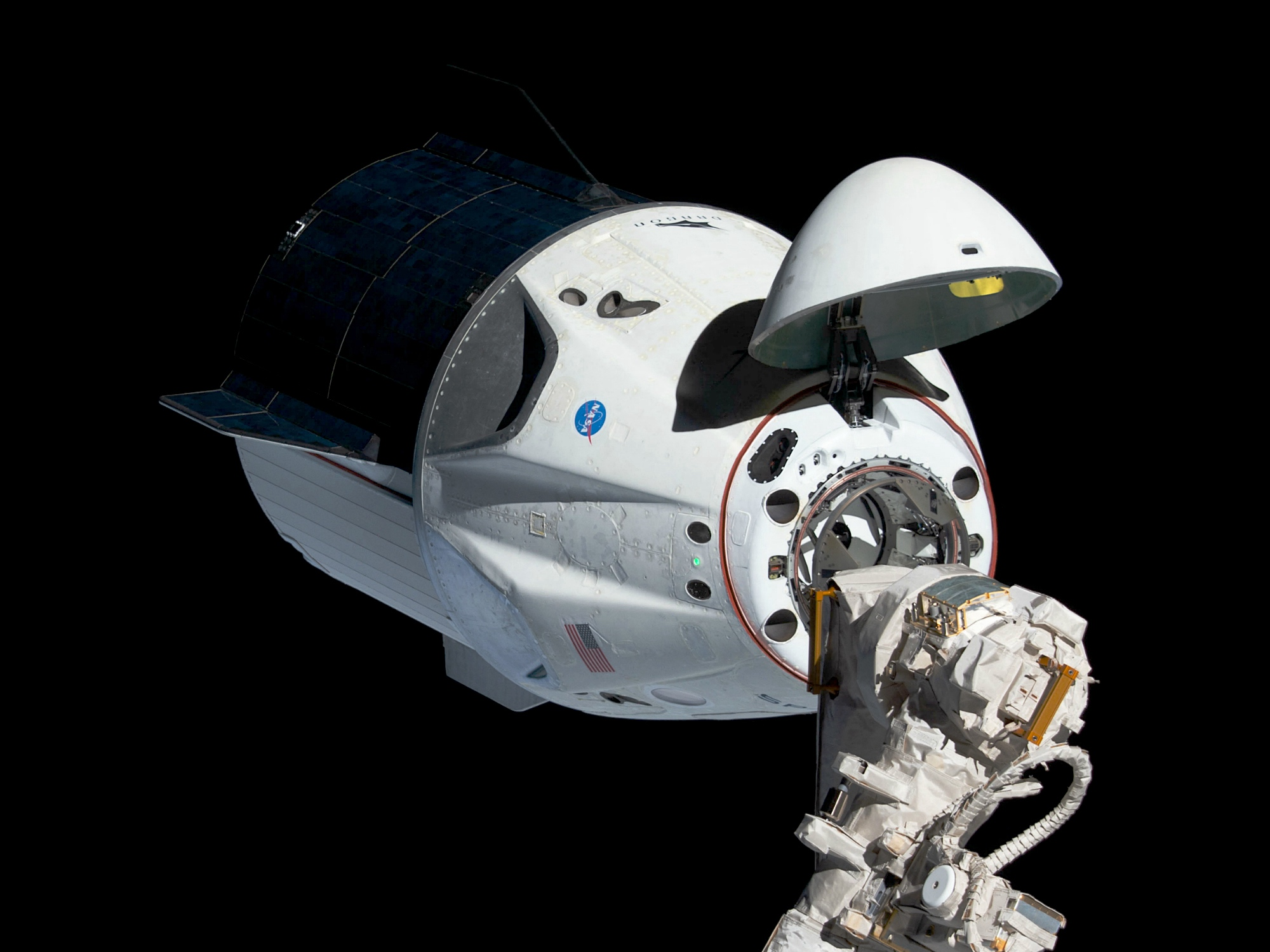
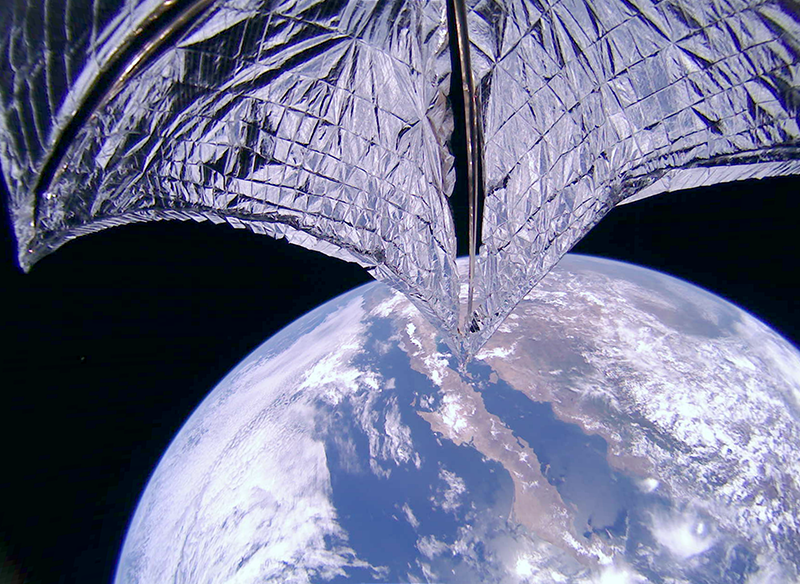
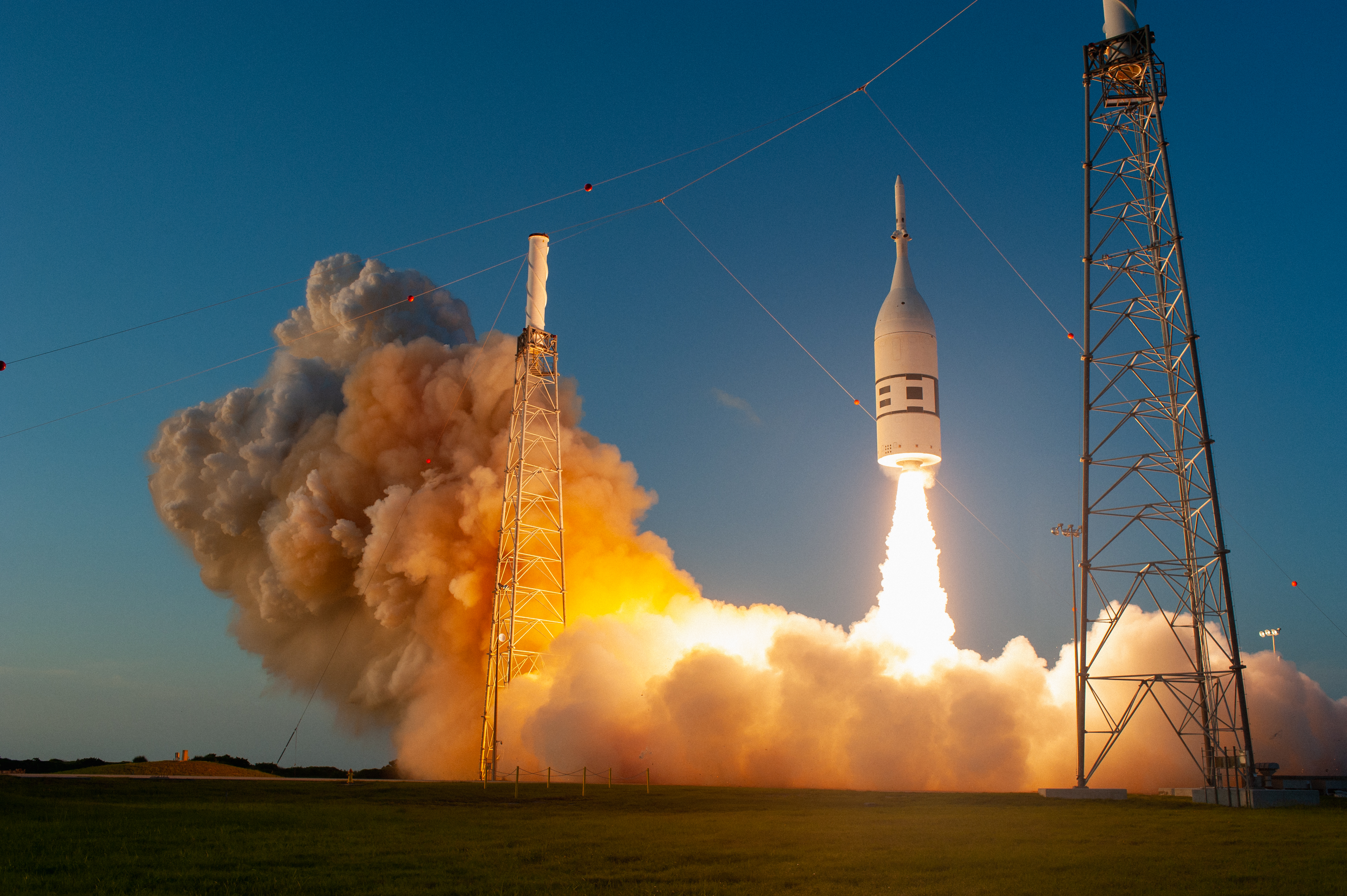
- Highlights from spaceflight in 2019 (Note: Clockwise from top: The Yutu-2 rover successfully operational on the far side of the Moon after the Chang'e 4 lander achieved humanity's first landing on the far side.; LightSail 2 deploys its solar sail in low Earth orbit in July. The mission, funded by The Planetary Society, successfully demonstrated propulsion using radiation pressure on its 32 m^{2} (340 ft^{2}) "sail".; Launch of a boilerplate Orion capsule, during the Ascent Abort-2 mission in July. The mission successfully tested the capability of Orion's upgraded launch escape system ahead of the Artemis program.; The first ever Crew Dragon capsule arrives at the International Space Station uncrewed, during Crew Dragon Demo-1 in March. The mission was the first in a series of test flights of Crew Dragon and the Boeing Starliner ahead of the Commercial Crew Program.)

Orbital launches
- First: 10 January
- Last: 27 December
- Total: 102
- Successes: 97
- Failures: 5
- Catalogued: 97

National firsts
- Spaceflight: Croatia (first payload)
- Satellite: Ethiopia; Nepal; Sri Lanka; Rwanda; Sudan
- Space traveller: United Arab Emirates

Rockets
- Maiden flights: Atlas V N22; Hyperbola-1; Jielong 1; OneSpace OS-M1; PSLV-DL; PSLV-QL; Antares 230+
- Retirements: Antares 230; Delta IV M+(5,4); Delta IV M+(4,2); Rokot; Safir; Soyuz-FG

Crewed flights
- Orbital: 3
- Suborbital: 1 (private)
- Total travellers: 12 (3 suborbital)
- EVAs: 11

2019 in spaceflight

This article documents notable spaceflight events during the year 2019.

== Overview ==
=== Astronomy and astrophysics ===
The Russian-German X-ray observing satellite Spektr-RG was launched on 13 July.

=== Lunar exploration ===
The Chinese probe Chang'e 4 made humanity's first soft landing on the far side of the Moon on 3 January and released its Yutu 2 rover to explore the lunar surface on the far side for the first time in human history.

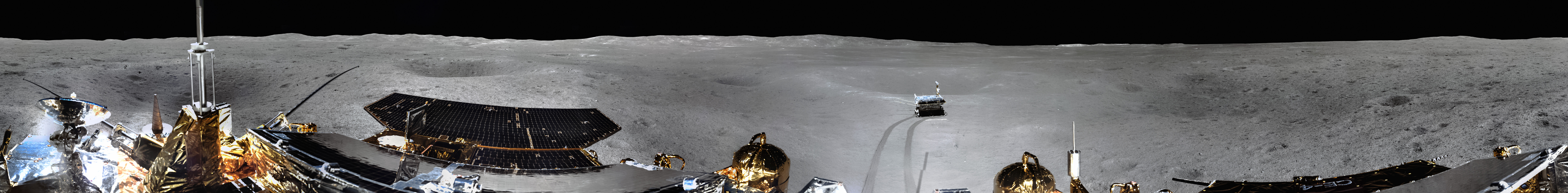
The first panorama from the far side of the Moon, captured by Chang'e 4 lander

Israel's SpaceIL, one of the participants in the expired Google Lunar X Prize, launched the first private mission to the Moon in February. The Beresheet lander from SpaceIL made the landing attempt in April, but crashed onto the Moon. India launched the delayed Chandrayaan-2 lunar orbiter/lander/rover in July; the orbiter reached lunar orbit in September, but the Vikram lander crashed onto the lunar surface.

=== Exploration of the Solar System ===
The probe New Horizons encountered the Kuiper belt object 486958 Arrokoth on 1 January. This is the farthest object from the Sun ever to have a close encounter with a spacecraft. The Japanese asteroid exploration mission Hayabusa2 made a second touchdown with 162173 Ryugu to collect samples, and departed for Earth on 12 November. NASA declared the Mars rover Opportunity's mission over on 13 February. The InSight lander observed the first recorded Marsquake in April.

=== Human spaceflight ===
The first Commercial Crew Development test missions flew this year, aiming to restore United States human spaceflight capability following Space Shuttle retirement in 2011. In an uncrewed test flight, SpaceX SpaceX Dragon 2 successfully flew on a Falcon 9 to the International Space Station on 3 March 2019; the crewed mission was delayed when the recovered capsule exploded during testing on 20 April. Boeing's CST-100 Starliner launched a similar uncrewed test flight on an Atlas V on 20 December, but an anomaly during launch meant that it could not reach the ISS and had to land only 2 days later.

=== Rocket innovation ===
At the beginning of the year, around 100 small satellite launchers were in active use, in development, or were recently cancelled or stalled. Three Chinese manufacturers launched their first orbital rocket in 2019: The maiden flight of OS-M1 in March failed to reach orbit, the maiden flights of Hyperbola-1 in July and of Jielong 1 in August were successful. The PSLV-DL and PSLV-QL variants of the Indian PSLV first flew in January and April respectively.

SpaceX began testing of the SpaceX Starship in 2019, with an uncrewed prototype "Starhopper" flying 150m in the air in a suborbital test flight on 27 August. The heavy-lift Long March 5 made its return to flight in December, more than two years after the July 2017 launch failure that grounded the vehicle and forced an engine redesign.

The "single stick" Delta IV was retired in August, and the analog-controlled Soyuz-FG was retired in September. Due to Ukraine banning control system exports to Russia, Rokot was retired after a final flight in December.

== Orbital and suborbital launches ==
List of orbital launches
Month	Num. of successes	Num. of failures
January	7	1
February	5	1
March	8	1
April	7	0
May	8	1
June	6	0
July	11	1
August	12	0
September	6	0
October	5	0
November	12	0
December	15	0
Total	102	5

== Deep-space rendezvous ==
Date (UTC)	Spacecraft	Event	Remarks
1 January	New Horizons	Flyby of Kuiper belt object 486958 Arrokoth	The observed planetesimal, consisting of two spheroid pieces, was initially nicknamed Ultima Thule.
3 January	Chang'e 4	Landing at Von Kármán crater	First landing on the far side of the Moon, coordinates 45.457°S 177.589°E.
12 February	Juno	18th perijove of Jupiter	
21 February	Hayabusa2	First sample collection from asteroid Ryugu	
4 April	Parker Solar Probe	Second perihelion	
4 April	Beresheet	Lunar orbital insertion	
5 April	Hayabusa2	Release of Small Carry-On Impactor (SCI) on the surface of Ryugu	SCI created a crater for further investigation. A dedicated DCAM-3 camera was deployed to observe the impact.
6 April	Juno	19th perijove	
11 April	Beresheet	Lunar landing	Crashed due to gyroscope failure
29 May	Juno	20th perijove	
11 July	Hayabusa2	Second sample collection from Ryugu	
21 July	Juno	21st perijove	
20 August	Chandrayaan-2	Lunar orbital insertion	
1 September	Parker Solar Probe	Third perihelion	
6 September	Chandrayaan-2	Lunar landing	Vikram lander crashed after it lost attitude and contact at an altitude of 2.3 km.
12 September	Juno	22nd perijove	
2 October	Hayabusa2	Deployment of ROVER-2 (MINERVA-II-2)	Rover failed before deployment, it was deployed in orbit around the asteroid to perform gravitational measurements before it impacted on 8 October.
3 November	Juno	23rd perijove	
13 November	Hayabusa2	Departure from Ryugu	
26 December	Parker Solar Probe	Second gravity assist at Venus	
26 December	Juno	24th perijove and distant Ganymede flyby	

== Extravehicular activities (EVAs) ==
Start date/time	Duration	End time	Spacecraft	Crew	Remarks
22 March 12:01	6 hours 39 minutes	18:40	Expedition 59 ISS Quest	(United States) Anne McClain (United States) Nick Hague	connected 3 new Li-ion batteries to replace 6 old Ni-H batteries on power channel 4A of the P4 truss segment.; cleaned up debris on Unity's common berthing mechanism using Kapton tape; secured a tieback for restraints on the solar array blanket box.
29 March 11:42	6 hours 45 minutes	18:27	Expedition 59 ISS Quest	(United States) Nick Hague (United States) Christina Koch	connected 3 new Li-ion batteries to replace 6 old Ni-H batteries on power channel 2A of the P4 truss segment.; disconnected cables and relocated an adapter plate to enable Canadarm2 to remove a failed Li-ion battery.
8 April 11:31	6 hours 29 minutes	18:00	Expedition 59 ISS Quest	(United States) Anne McClain (Canada) David Saint-Jacques	installed jumper cables between the Unity module and the S0 truss to establish redundant power to Canadarm2.; installed cables to provide for more expansive wireless communications coverage outside the orbital complex.; relocated an adapter plate from the 22 March spacewalk in preparation for future battery upgrade operations
29 May 15:42	6 hours 1 minute	21:43	Expedition 59 ISS Pirs	(Russia) Oleg Kononenko (Russia) Aleksey Ovchinin	removed experiments from the Pirs docking compartment and cleaned the windows.; installed a handrail to connect Zarya to Poisk and re-positioned the Plume Measuring Unit.; moved to the Zvesda Service Module and removed and jettisoned the Plasma Monitoring Units.; wished happy birthday to Alexei Leonov who is the first spacewalker and is celebrating his 85th birthday on 30 May. Also brought a picture of Leonov into space with them.
21 August 12:27	6 hours 32 minutes	18:59	Expedition 60 ISS Quest	(United States) Nick Hague (United States) Andrew R. Morgan	Hague and Morgan installed the final International Docking Adapter on the Harmony Module. The task for this spacewalk was identical to Spacewalk 194 and required work by both spacewalkers and Dextre to get the docking port installed in preparation for the Boeing CST-100 Starliner orbital flight test, which will occur by the end of December. The crew also routed cables and installed Wi-Fi routers for upcoming experiments.
6 October 11:39	7 hours 01 minutes	18:40	Expedition 61 ISS Quest	(United States) Christina Koch (United States) Andrew R. Morgan	This spacewalk was the first of Expedition 61 and the first in a series of five to replace and improve ISS batteries on the P6 truss.
11 October 11:38	6 hours 45 minutes	18:23	Expedition 61 ISS Quest	(United States) Andrew R. Morgan (United States) Christina Koch	This spacewalk was the second of Expedition 61 and the second in a series of five to replace and improve ISS batteries on the P6 truss. Before they went out to the hatch, Mission Control Moscow relayed to the crew that Alexei Leonov had died and that this spacewalk was dedicated to him. As the crew came in and took off their suits, each gave a few words in memory of Leonov before station commander Luca Parmitano said "Farewell Alexei, and ad astra."
18 October 11:38	7 hours 17 minutes	18:55	Expedition 61 ISS Quest	(United States) Christina Koch (United States) Jessica Meir	This spacewalk was the third of Expedition 61 and the third in a series of five to replace and improve ISS batteries on the P6 truss. Some of the battery swaps were delayed to EVA 222 due to a power failure in a Battery Charge Discharge Unit in slots 5 and 6 on the P6 Truss taking the 4B battery channel offline. Koch and Meir replaced the failed unit and brought it back inside. The battery swap was moved to EVA 222 to save time and Meir and Koch wrapped up the spacewalk by installing a stanchion on the Columbus Module and tightening the bolts on the S0 Truss, which had come loose. This spacewalk was the first all-female spacewalk. During the spacewalk, President Trump called the station and congratulated Koch and Meir on this milestone.
15 November 11:39	6 hours 39 minutes	18:18	Expedition 61 ISS Quest	(Italy) Luca Parmitano (United States) Andrew Morgan	First of a series of four spacewalks to repair the Alpha Magnetic Spectrometer which suffered a power failure last year in one of its four cooling pumps limiting the operation of the experiment. Parmitano and Morgan went outside and removed a cover plate from AMS and jettisoned it into space to make way for a cryo pump that they will assemble between spacewalks. Some of the bolts put up a fight but Parmitano got them all out. The highlight of the spacewalk is when Andrew Morgan threw the cover plate overboard and it drifted off aft of the station into the vacuum of space. The plate will stay in orbit for a few days until the end of December when it enters the atmosphere and burns up. The crew also removed several carbon fiber strips around fluid lines and installed handrails and grapple bars as get-ahead task. This spacewalk marks Parmitano's return to spacewalking after the Water in the Helmet Incident during EVA 171.
22 November 12:02	6 hours 33 minutes	16:35	Expedition 61 ISS Quest	(Italy) Luca Parmitano (United States) Andrew Morgan	The second in a series of four spacewalks to repair the AMS. Parmitano and Morgan cut fluid lines and installed a vent on the AMS Experiment to prep the old cooling pump for removal on the third spacewalk. Parmitano and Morgan also routed cables and installed a new power supply to power the pumps when they are installed on the third spacewalk.
2 December 11:31	6 hours 2 minutes	17:33	Expedition 61 ISS Quest	(Italy) Luca Parmitano (United States) Andrew Morgan	The third in a series of four spacewalks to repair the AMS. Parmitano and Morgan went out on the third spacewalk and installed the cryo pump and routed fluid and electrical lines to power the pump. Flight controllers in Houston, Huntsville, and at CERN activated the experiment and radioed to the crew that AMS passed with flying colors. The crew finished the spacewalk by doing a get-ahead task by covering AMS with thermal blanket.

== Space debris events ==
Date/Time (UTC)	Source object	Event type	Pieces tracked	Remarks
27 March	(India) Microsat-R (suspected) and kinetic kill vehicle	2019 Indian anti-satellite missile test	121	Indian Prime Minister Narendra Modi announced a successful test of an anti-satellite weapon. The test was believed to have destroyed the Microsat-R satellite launched in January.
Early April	(United States) A Centaur 3 upper stage (previously International Designator 2018-079B)	Unknown	54	The upper stage of the Centaur 3 that carried AEHF −4 in high Earth orbit on 17 October 2018 broke up for unknown reasons.
7 May	(United States) Titan IIIC Transtage rocket body	Titan IIIC Transtage rocket body	? (Note: No fragments have entered the SSN catalog as 2/4/20)	Energetic fragmentation event by caused the overheating of leftover anhydrous hydrazine(N2H4) Mono Propellant
13 August	(France) Ariane 42P third stage rocket body	Unknown	7	
19 August	(Russia) SOZ (Sistema Obespecheniya Zapuska) ullage motor	Proton Block DM fourth stage	? (Note: Due to difficulties in tracking objects in deep space elliptical orbits it is unknown how many fragments were generated)	Energetic fragmentation event; caused by left over fuel in the ullage motor.

== Orbital launch statistics ==
=== By country ===
For the purposes of this section, the yearly tally of orbital launches by country assigns each flight to the country of origin of the rocket, not to the launch services provider or the spaceport. For example, Soyuz launches by Arianespace in Kourou are counted under Russia because Soyuz-2 is a Russian rocket.

Country	Launches	Successes	Failures	Partial failures
China	34	32	2	0
France	4	4	0	0
India	6	6	0	0
Iran	2 (Note: Additionally, one rocket exploded on the launch pad during a ground test.)	0	2	0
Italy	2	1	1	0
Japan	2	2	0	0
Russia	25 (Note: Includes three European Soyuz launches from Kourou, French Guiana by Arianespace.)	25	0	0
United States	27 (Note: Includes Electron launches from Māhia)	27	0	0
World	102	97	5	0

=== By rocket ===
- Antares 230+
- Ariane 5
- Atlas V
- Delta IV
- Delta IV Heavy
- Electron
- Falcon 9 new
- Falcon 9 reused
- Falcon Heavy
- Kuaizhou 1A
- Long March 2
- Long March 3
- Long March 4
- Long March 5
- Long March 6
- Long March 11
- PSLV
- Soyuz-FG
- Soyuz-2 (Russia)
- Soyuz-ST (Europe)
- Proton-M
- Rokot
- Vega
- Others

==== By family ====
Family	Country	Launches	Successes	Failures	Partial failures	Remarks
Antares	United States	2	2	0	0	
Ariane	France	4	4	0	0	
Atlas	United States	2	2	0	0	
Delta	United States	3	3	0	0	
Electron	United States	6	6	0	0	
Epsilon	Japan	1	1	0	0	
Falcon	United States	13	13	0	0	
GLSV Mk III	India	1	1	0	0	
H-II	Japan	1	1	0	0	
Hyperbola	China	1	1	0	0	Maiden flight
Jielong	China	1	1	0	0	Maiden flight
Kuaizhou	China	5	5	0	0	
Long March	China	26	25	1	0	
Pegasus	United States	1	1	0	0	
OneSpace	China	1	0	1	0	Maiden flight
PSLV	India	5	5	0	0	
R-7	Russia	18	18	0	0	
Safir	Iran	1	0	1	0	
Simorgh	Iran	1	0	1	0	
Universal Rocket	Russia	7	7	0	0	
Vega	Italy	2	1	1	0	

==== By type ====
Rocket	Country	Family	Launches	Successes	Failures	Partial failures	Remarks
Antares 200	United States	Antares	2	2	0	0	
Ariane 5	France	Ariane	4	4	0	0	
Atlas V	United States	Atlas	2	2	0	0	
Delta IV	United States	Delta	3	3	0	0	
Electron	United States	Electron	6	6	0	0	
Epsilon	Japan	Epsilon	1	1	0	0	
Falcon 9	United States	Falcon	13	13	0	0	
GLSV Mk III	India	GLSV Mk III	1	1	0	0	
H-IIB	Japan	H-II	1	1	0	0	
Hyperbola-1	China	Hyperbola	1	1	0	0	Maiden flight
Jielong 1	China	Jielong	1	1	0	0	Maiden flight
Kuaizhou-1	China	Kuaizhou	5	5	0	0	
Long March 2	China	Long March	2	2	0	0	
Long March 3	China	Long March	12	12	0	0	
Long March 4	China	Long March	7	6	1	0	
Long March 5	China	Long March	1	1	0	0	
Long March 6	China	Long March	1	1	0	0	
Long March 11	China	Long March	3	3	0	0	
OS-M1	China	OneSpace	1	0	1	0	Maiden flight
Pegasus XL	United States	Pegasus	1	1	0	0	
Proton	Russia	Universal Rocket	5	5	0	0	
PSLV	India	PSLV	5	5	0	0	
Safir	Iran	Safir	1	0	1	0	Final flight
Simorgh	Iran	Simorgh	1	0	1	0	
Soyuz	Russia	R-7	3	3	0	0	Final flight
Soyuz-2	Russia	R-7	15	15	0	0	
UR-100	Russia	Universal Rocket	2	2	0	0	Final flight
Vega	Italy	Vega	2	1	1	0	

==== By configuration ====
Rocket	Country	Type	Launches	Successes	Failures	Partial failures	Remarks
Antares 230	United States	Antares 200	1	1	0	0	Final flight
Antares 230+	United States	Antares 200	1	1	0	0	Maiden flight
Ariane 5 ECA	France	Ariane 5	4	4	0	0	
Atlas V 401	United States	Atlas V	0	0	0	0	
Atlas V 411	United States	Atlas V	0	0	0	0	
Atlas V 531	United States	Atlas V	0	0	0	0	
Atlas V 551	United States	Atlas V	1	1	0	0	
Atlas V N22	United States	Atlas V	1	1	0	0	Maiden flight
Delta IV Medium+ (4,2)	United States	Delta IV	1	1	0	0	Final flight
Delta IV Medium+ (5,4)	United States	Delta IV	1	1	0	0	Final flight
Delta IV Heavy	United States	Delta IV	1	1	0	0	
Epsilon	Japan	Epsilon	1	1	0	0	
Electron	United States	Electron	6	6	0	0	
Falcon 9 Block 5	United States	Falcon 9	11	11	0	0	
Falcon Heavy	United States	Falcon 9	2	2	0	0	
GSLV Mk III	India	GSLV Mk III	1	1	0	0	
H-IIB	Japan	H-IIB	1	1	0	0	
Hyperbola-1	China	Hyperbola-1	1	1	0	0	Maiden flight
Jielong 1	China	Jielong 1	1	1	0	0	Maiden flight
Kuaizhou-1A	China	Kuaizhou-1	5	5	0	0	
Long March 2C	China	Long March 2	1	1	0	0	
Long March 2D	China	Long March 2	1	1	0	0	
Long March 3B/E	China	Long March 3	8	8	0	0	
Long March 3B/E / YZ-1	China	Long March 3	3	3	0	0	
Long March 3C/E	China	Long March 3	1	1	0	0	
Long March 4B	China	Long March 4	4	4	0	0	
Long March 4C	China	Long March 4	3	2	1	0	
Long March 5	China	Long March 5	1	1	0	0	
Long March 6	China	Long March 6	1	1	0	0	
Long March 11	China	Long March 11	3	3	0	0	
OS-M1	China	OneSpace	1	0	1	0	Maiden flight
Pegasus XL	United States	Pegasus XL	1	1	0	0	
Proton-M / Briz-M or DM-03	Russia	Proton	3	3	0	0	
Proton-M / Blok DM-03	Russia	Proton	2	2	0	0	
PSLV-CA	India	PSLV	1	1	0	0	
PLSV-DL	India	PSLV	1	1	0	0	Maiden flight
PLSV-QL	India	PSLV	2	2	0	0	Maiden flight
PLSV-XL	India	PSLV	1	1	0	0	
Rokot / Briz-KM	Russia	UR-100	2	2	0	0	Final flight
Safir	Iran	Safir	1	0	1	0	Final flight
Simorgh	Iran	Simorgh	1	0	1	0	
Soyuz-FG	Russia	Soyuz	3	3	0	0	Final flight
Soyuz-2.1a or ST-A	Russia	Soyuz-2	4	4	0	0	
Soyuz-2.1a or ST-A / Fregat-M	Russia	Soyuz-2	2	2	0	0	
Soyuz-2.1b or ST-B / Fregat-M	Russia	Soyuz-2	7	7	0	0	
Soyuz-2-1v / Volga	Russia	Soyuz-2	2	2	0	0	
Vega	Italy	Vega	2	1	1	0	

=== By spaceport ===
- Jiuquan
- Taiyuan
- Wenchang
- Xichang
- Yellow Sea
- Kourou
- Satish Dhawan
- Semnan
- Tanegashima
- Uchinoura
- Baikonur
- Mahia
- Plesetsk
- Vostochny
- Cape Canaveral
- Kennedy
- MARS
- Vandenberg

Site	Country	Launches	Successes	Failures	Partial failures	Remarks
Baikonur	Kazakhstan	13	13	0	0	
Cape Canaveral	United States	13	13	0	0	Includes the 11 October Pegasus XL launch whose carrier aircraft took flight from Cape Canaveral
Jiuquan	China	9	8	1	0	
Kennedy	United States	3	3	0	0	
Kourou	France	9	8	1	0	
Mahia	New Zealand	6	6	0	0	
MARS	United States	2	2	0	0	
Plesetsk	Russia	8	8	0	0	
Satish Dhawan	India	6	6	0	0	
Semnan	Iran	2	0	2	0	Additionally, one rocket exploded on the launch pad during a ground test.
Taiyuan	China	10	9	1	0	
Tanegashima	Japan	1	1	0	0	
Uchinoura	Japan	1	1	0	0	
Vandenberg	United States	3	3	0	0	
Vostochny	Russia	1	1	0	0	
Wenchang	China	1	1	0	0	
Xichang	China	13	13	0	0	
Yellow Sea	China	1	1	0	0	
Total		102	97	5	0	

=== By orbit ===
- Low Earth
- Low Earth (ISS)
- Low Earth (SSO)
- Medium Earth
- Molniya
- Geosychronous (transfer)
- Inclined GSO
- High Earth
- Heliocentric

Orbital regime	Launches	Achieved	Not achieved	Accidentally achieved	Remarks
Transatmospheric	0	0	0	0	
Low Earth / Sun-synchronous	66	61	5	0	
Medium Earth	9	9	0	0	
Geosynchronous / GTO	24	24	0	0	Includes two inclined GSO orbits (IGSO)
High Earth / Lunar transfer	2	2	0	0	
Heliocentric / Planetary transfer	1	1	0	0	
Total	102	97	5	0	
