= Spaceport =

Location used to launch and receive spacecraft

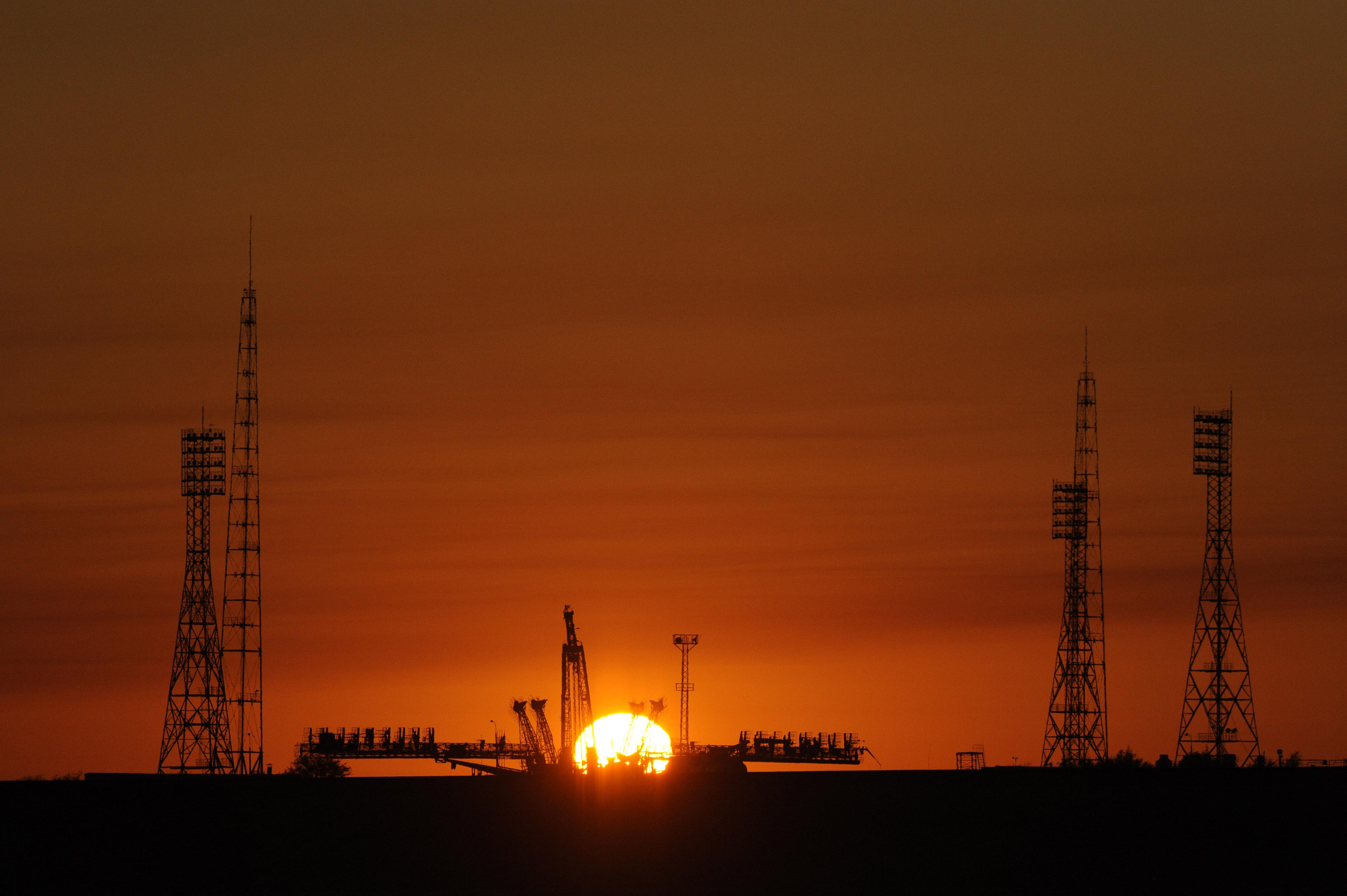
The Baikonur Cosmodrome (Gagarin's Start launch pad)

A spaceport or cosmodrome is a site for launching or receiving spacecraft, by analogy to a seaport for ships or an airport for aircraft. The word spaceport, and even more so cosmodrome, has traditionally been used for sites capable of launching spacecraft into orbit around Earth or on interplanetary trajectories. However, rocket launch sites for purely sub-orbital flights are sometimes called spaceports, as in recent years new and proposed sites for suborbital human flights have been frequently referred to or named "spaceports". Space stations and proposed future bases on the Moon are sometimes called spaceports, in particular if intended as a base for further journeys.

The term rocket launch site is used for any facility from which rockets are launched. It may contain one or more launch pads or suitable sites to mount a transportable launch pad. It is typically surrounded by a large safety area, often called a rocket range or missile range. The range includes the area over which launched rockets are expected to fly through, and within which some components of the rockets may land. Tracking stations are sometimes located in the range to assess the progress of the launches.

Major spaceports often include more than one launch complex, which can be rocket launch sites adapted for different types of launch vehicles. (These sites can be well-separated for safety reasons.) For launch vehicles with liquid propellant, suitable storage facilities and, in some cases, production facilities are necessary. On-site processing facilities for solid propellants are also common.

A spaceport may also include runways for takeoff and landing of aircraft to support spaceport operations, or to enable support of horizontal takeoff and horizontal landing (HTHL) or horizontal takeoff and vertical landing (HTVL) winged launch vehicles.

In January 2025, traffic jams were reported to be forming at U.S. rocket-launch sites due to the increasing volume of flights by companies like Space X, Blue Origin and Virgin Galactic. Three sites in Florida and California currently handle the majority of U.S. rocket launches.

== History ==
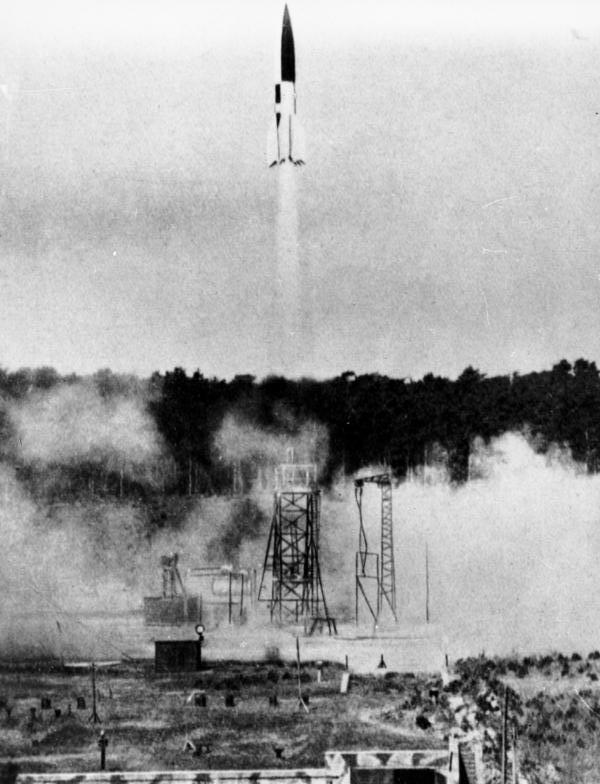
Peenemünde, Germany, where the V-2, the first rocket to reach space in June 1944, was launched

The first rockets to reach space were V-2 rockets launched from Peenemünde, Germany in 1944 during World War II. After the war, 70 complete V-2 rockets were brought to White Sands for test launches, with 47 of them reaching altitudes between 100 km and 213 km.

The world's first spaceport for orbital and human launches, the Baikonur Cosmodrome in southern Kazakhstan, started as a Soviet military rocket range in 1955. It achieved the first orbital flight (Sputnik 1) in October 1957. The exact location of the cosmodrome was initially held secret. Guesses to its location were misdirected by a name in common with a mining town 320 km away. The position became known in 1957 outside the Soviet Union only after U-2 planes had identified the site by following railway lines in the Kazakh SSR, although Soviet authorities did not confirm the location for decades.

The Baikonur Cosmodrome achieved the first launch of a human into space (Yuri Gagarin) in 1961. The launch complex used, Site 1, has reached a special symbolic significance and is commonly called Gagarin's Start. Baikonur was the primary Soviet cosmodrome, and is still frequently used by Russia under a lease arrangement with Kazakhstan.

In response to the early Soviet successes, the United States built up a major spaceport complex at Cape Canaveral in Florida. A large number of uncrewed flights, as well as the early human flights, were carried out at Cape Canaveral Space Force Station. For the Apollo programme, an adjacent spaceport, Kennedy Space Center, was constructed, and achieved the first crewed mission to the lunar surface (Apollo 11) in July 1969. It was the base for all Space Shuttle launches and most of their runway landings. For details on the launch complexes of the two spaceports, see List of Cape Canaveral and Merritt Island launch sites.

The Guiana Space Centre in Kourou, French Guiana, is France's spaceport, with satellite launches that benefit from the location 5 degrees north of the equator.

In October 2003 the Jiuquan Satellite Launch Center achieved the first Chinese human spaceflight.

Breaking with tradition, in June 2004 on a runway at Mojave Air and Space Port, California, a human was for the first time launched to space in a privately funded, suborbital spaceflight, that was intended to pave the way for future commercial spaceflights. The spacecraft, SpaceShipOne, was launched by a carrier airplane taking off horizontally.

At Cape Canaveral, SpaceX in 2015 made the first successful landing and recovery of a first stage used in a vertical satellite launch.

== Location ==
Rockets can most easily reach satellite orbits if launched near the equator in an easterly direction, as this maximizes use of the Earth's rotational speed (465 m/s at the equator). Such launches also provide a desirable orientation for arriving at a geostationary orbit. For polar orbits and Molniya orbits this does not apply.

In principle, advantages of high altitude launch are reduced vertical distance to travel and a thinner atmosphere for the rocket to penetrate. However, altitude of the launch site is not a driving factor in spaceport placement because most of the delta-v for a launch is spent on achieving the required horizontal orbital speed. The small gain from a few kilometers of extra altitude does not usually off-set the logistical costs of ground transport in mountainous terrain.

Many spaceports have been placed at existing military installations, such as intercontinental ballistic missile ranges, which are not always physically ideal sites for launch.

A rocket launch site is built as far as possible away from major population centers in order to not inconvenience their inhabitants with noise pollution and other undesired industrial activity, as well as mitigate risk to bystanders should a rocket experience a catastrophic failure. In many cases a launch site is built close to major bodies of water to ensure that no components are shed over populated areas, be it by staging or an in-flight failure. Typically a spaceport site is large enough that, should a vehicle explode, it will not endanger human lives or adjacent launch pads.

Planned sites of spaceports for sub-orbital tourist spaceflight often make use of existing ground infrastructure, including runways. The nature of the local view from 100 km (62 mi) altitude is also a factor to consider.

== Space tourism ==
The space tourism industry (see List of private spaceflight companies) is being targeted by spaceports in numerous locations worldwide. e.g. Spaceport America, New Mexico.

The establishment of spaceports for tourist trips raises legal issues, which are only beginning to be addressed.

== With achieved vertical launches of humans ==
The following is a table of spaceports and launch complexes for vertical launchers with documented achieved launches of humans to space (more than 100 km (62 mi) altitude). The sorting order is spaceport by spaceport according to the time of the first human launch.

Spaceport	Launch complex	Launcher	Program	Flights	Years
(Kazakhstan) (Russia) (Soviet Union) Baikonur Cosmodrome (Note: The Baikonur Cosmodrome is located in Kazakhstan, but it is operated by Roscosmos, and previously by the Soviet space program.)	Site 1	Vostok	Vostok 1–6	6 Orbital	1961–1963
(Kazakhstan) (Russia) (Soviet Union) Baikonur Cosmodrome	Site 1	Voskhod	Voskhod 1–2	2 Orbital	1964–1965
(Kazakhstan) (Russia) (Soviet Union) Baikonur Cosmodrome	Site 1, 31	Soyuz, Soyuz-U	Soyuz 1–40 †	37 Orbital	1967–1981
(Kazakhstan) (Russia) (Soviet Union) Baikonur Cosmodrome	Site 1, 31	Soyuz	Soyuz 18a	1 Sub-O	1975
(Kazakhstan) (Russia) (Soviet Union) Baikonur Cosmodrome	Site 1, 31	Soyuz-U, Soyuz-U2	Soyuz-T 2–15	14 Orbital	1980–1986
(Kazakhstan) (Russia) (Soviet Union) Baikonur Cosmodrome	Site 1	Soyuz-U, Soyuz-U2	Soyuz-TM 2–34	33 Orbital	1987–2002
(Kazakhstan) (Russia) (Soviet Union) Baikonur Cosmodrome	Site 1	Soyuz-FG	Soyuz-TMA 1–22	22 Orbital	2002–2011
(Kazakhstan) (Russia) (Soviet Union) Baikonur Cosmodrome	Site 1, 31	Soyuz-FG	Soyuz TMA-M 1–20	20 Orbital	2010–2016
(Kazakhstan) (Russia) (Soviet Union) Baikonur Cosmodrome	Site 1, 31	Soyuz-FG	Soyuz MS 1–9, 11–13, 15	13 Orbital	2016–2019
(Kazakhstan) (Russia) (Soviet Union) Baikonur Cosmodrome	Site 1, 31	Soyuz-2	Soyuz MS 16–22, 24	8 Orbital	2020–
(United States) Cape Canaveral Space Force Station	LC-5	Redstone	Mercury 3–4	2 Sub-O	1961
(United States) Cape Canaveral Space Force Station	LC-14	Atlas	Mercury 6–9	4 Orbital	1962–1963
(United States) Cape Canaveral Space Force Station	LC-19	Titan II	Gemini 3–12	10 Orbital	1965–1966
(United States) Cape Canaveral Space Force Station	LC-34	Saturn IB	Apollo 7	1 Orbital	1968
(United States) Cape Canaveral Space Force Station	LC-41	Atlas V	Boeing Starliner	1 Orbital	2024–
(United States) Cape Canaveral Space Force Station	LC-40	Falcon 9	Crew Dragon	1 Orbital	2024–
(United States) Kennedy Space Center	LC-39	Saturn V	Apollo 8–17	10 Lun/Or	1968–1972
(United States) Kennedy Space Center	LC-39	Saturn IB	Skylab 2–4, Apollo–Soyuz	4 Orbital	1973–1975
(United States) Kennedy Space Center	LC-39	Space Shuttle	STS 1-135‡	134 Orbital	1981–2011
(United States) Kennedy Space Center	LC-39	Falcon 9	Crew Dragon	11 Orbital	2020–
(United States) Kennedy Space Center	LC-39	SLS	Artemis 2	1 Lun/orb	2026
(China) Jiuquan Satellite Launch Center	Area 4	Long March 2F	Shenzhou 5–7, 9–17	12 Orbital	2003–
(United States) Corn Ranch	Launch Site One	New Shepard	New Shepard	6 Sub-O	2021–

† Three of the Soyuz missions were uncrewed and are not counted (Soyuz 2, Soyuz 20, Soyuz 34).

‡ STS-51-L (Challenger) failed to reach orbit and is not counted. STS-107 (Columbia) reached orbit and is therefore included in the count (disaster struck on re-entry).

Crewed Missions failed to reach Kármán line:

Soyuz T-10a (1983)

STS-51-L (1986)

Soyuz MS-10 (2018)

== With achieved satellite launches ==
The following is a table of spaceports with a documented achieved launch to orbit. The table is sorted according to the time of the first launch that achieved satellite orbit insertion. The first column gives the geographical location. Operations from a different country are indicated in the fourth column. A launch is counted as one also in cases where the payload consists of multiple satellites.

Spaceport	Location	Years (orbital)	Launches to orbit or inter- planetary	Launch vehicles (operators)	Sources
(Kazakhstan) (Russia) (Soviet Union) Baikonur Cosmodrome	Kazakhstan	1957–	>1,000	R-7/Soyuz, Kosmos, Proton, Tsyklon, Zenit, Energia, Dnepr, N1, Rokot, Strela	
(United States) Cape Canaveral Space Force Station	United States	1958–	>400	Delta, Scout, Atlas, Titan, Saturn, Athena, Falcon 9, Minotaur IV, Vanguard, Juno, Thor	
(United States) Vandenberg Space Force Base	United States	1959–	>700	Delta, Scout, Atlas, Titan, Taurus, Athena, Minotaur, Falcon 9, Thor, Firefly Alpha	
(United States) Wallops Flight Facility (Note: The Mid-Atlantic Regional Spaceport is co-located with the Wallops Flight Facility.)	United States	1961–1985	19	Scout	6+13
(Russia) Kapustin Yar Cosmodrome	Russia	1962–2008	85	Kosmos	
(France) CIEES	French Algeria	1965–1967	4	Diamant A (France)	Diamant
(Russia) Plesetsk Cosmodrome	Russia	1966–	>1,500	R-7/Soyuz, Kosmos, Tsyklon-3, Rokot, Angara, Start	
(Italy) Broglio Space Centre	Kenya	1967–1988	9	Scout (ASI and Sapienza, Italy)	Broglio
(United States) Kennedy Space Center	United States	1967–	187	17 Saturn, 135 Space Shuttle, 63 Falcon 9, 14 Falcon Heavy, 1 SLS	Saturn, STS, F9
(Australia) Woomera Prohibited Area	Australia	1967, 1971	2	Redstone (WRESAT), Black Arrow (UK Prospero X-3), Europa	WRESAT, X-3
(Japan) Uchinoura Space Center	Japan	1970–	31	27 Mu, 3 Epsilon, 1 SS-520-5	M, ε, S
(France) (European Union) Guiana Space Centre	French Guiana	1970–	318	7 Diamant, 227 Ariane, 16 Soyuz-2, 11 Vega	see 4 rockets
(China) Jiuquan Satellite Launch Center	China	1970–	121	2 LM1, 3 LM2A, 20 LM2C, 36 LM2D, 13 LM2F, 3 LM4B, 5 LM4C, 3 LM11	See 8 rockets
(Japan) Tanegashima Space Center	Japan	1975–	65	6 N-I, 8 N-II, 9 H-I, 6 H-II, 36 H-IIA	see 5 rockets
(India) Satish Dhawan Space Centre	India	1979–	93	4 SLV, 4 ASLV, 60 PSLV, 16GSLV, 7 LVM3, 2 SSLV	List SDSC
(China) Xichang Satellite Launch Center	China	1984–	183	Long March: 6 LM2C, 5 LM2E, 11 LM3, 25 LM3A, 42 LM3B, 15 LM3C	See 6 rockets
(China) Taiyuan Satellite Launch Center	China	1988–	62	Long March: 16 LM2C, 2 LM2D, 2 LM4A, 25 LM4B, 15 LM4C, 2 LM6	See 6 rockets
(Israel) Palmachim Airbase	Israel	1988–	8	Shavit	Shavit
Various airport runways (Balls 8, Stargazer)	Various	1990–	39	Pegasus	Pegasus
(Russia) Svobodny Cosmodrome	Russia	1997–2006	5	Start-1	
(Russia) Delta-class submarine	Barents Sea	1998, 2006	2	Shtil' (Russia), Volna-O	Shtil'
Odyssey mobile platform	Pacific Ocean	1999–2014	32	Zenit-3SL (Sea Launch)	Sea Launch
(United States) Pacific Spaceport Complex	United States	2001–	3	1 Athena, 2 Minotaur IV	Kodiak
(Russia) Yasny Cosmodrome	Russia	2006–	10	Dnepr	Dnepr
(United States) Mid-Atlantic Regional Spaceport	United States	2006–	12	5 Minotaur I, 6 Antares, 1 Minotaur V	MARS
(United States) Omelek, Kwajalein Atoll	Marshall Islands	2008–2009	5	5 Falcon 1 (US)	Falcon 1
(Iran) Semnan Space Center	Iran	2009–	26	Safir, Simorgh, Zuljanah	Safir
(North Korea) Sohae Satellite Launching Station	North Korea	2012–	2	Unha-3	K3-U2
(South Korea) Naro Space Center	South Korea	2013–	2	Naro-1, Nuri	Naro-1, Nuri
(Russia) Vostochny Cosmodrome	Russia	2016–	8	8 Soyuz-2	Vostochny
(China) Wenchang Satellite Launch Center	China	2016–	23	Long March: 9 LM5, 12 LM7, 2 LM8	See 3 rockets
(New Zealand) (United States) Rocket Lab Launch Complex 1	New Zealand	2018–	21	21 Electron	Electron (rocket)
(China) Dongfang Spaceport	Yellow sea, East China sea	2019–	6	4 Long March 11, 1 SD3, 1 CERES-1	See 3 rockets
(Iran) Shahroud Space Center	Iran	2020–	7	3 Qased, 4 Qaem 100	
(Norway) Andøya Space	Norway	2026–	1	Spectrum	
(United States) SpaceX Starbase	United States	2026–	1	Starship	

== With achieved horizontal launches of humans to 100 km ==
The following table shows spaceports with documented achieved launches of humans to at least 100 km altitude, starting from a horizontal runway. All the flights were sub-orbital.

Spaceport	Carrier aircraft	Spacecraft	Flights above 100 km	Years
(United States) Edwards Air Force Base	B-52	X-15	2	1963
(United States) Mojave Air and Space Port	White Knight	SpaceShipOne	3	2004

== Beyond Earth ==
Spaceports have been proposed for locations on the Moon, Mars, orbiting the Earth, at Sun-Earth and Earth-Moon Lagrange points, and at other locations in the Solar System. Human-tended outposts on the Moon or Mars, for example, will be spaceports by definition. The 2012 Space Studies Program of the International Space University studied the economic benefit of a network of spaceports throughout the solar system beginning from Earth and expanding outwardly in phases, within its team project Operations And Service Infrastructure for Space (OASIS). Its analysis claimed that the first phase, placing the "Node 1" spaceport with space tug services in low Earth orbit (LEO), would be commercially profitable and reduce transportation costs to geosynchronous orbit by as much as 44% (depending on the launch vehicle). The second phase would add a Node 2 spaceport on the lunar surface to provide services including lunar ice mining and delivery of rocket propellants back to Node 1. This would enable lunar surface activities and further reduce transportation costs within and out from cislunar space. The third phase would add a Node 3 spaceport on the Martian moon Phobos to enable refueling and resupply prior to Mars surface landings, missions beyond Mars, and return trips to Earth. In addition to propellant mining and refueling, the network of spaceports could provide services such as power storage and distribution, in-space assembly and repair of spacecraft, communications relay, shelter, construction and leasing of infrastructure, maintaining spacecraft positioned for future use, and logistics.

Lunar ascent of the ascent stage from the last Apollo lunar base at Taurus–Littrow (Apollo 17, 1972).

== Impact ==
Space launch facilities have been colonial developments and have also been impacting its surroundings by destroying or polluting their environment, creating precarious cleanup situations.

== See also ==
- Launch pad
- List of human spaceflights
- List of rocket launch sites
- Office of Commercial Space Transportation (United States)
- Orbital spaceflight
- Range safety
- Spaceflight
- Sub-orbital spaceflight
