= Saman-1 (rocket stage) =

Iranian space tug

Saman-1 upper-stage
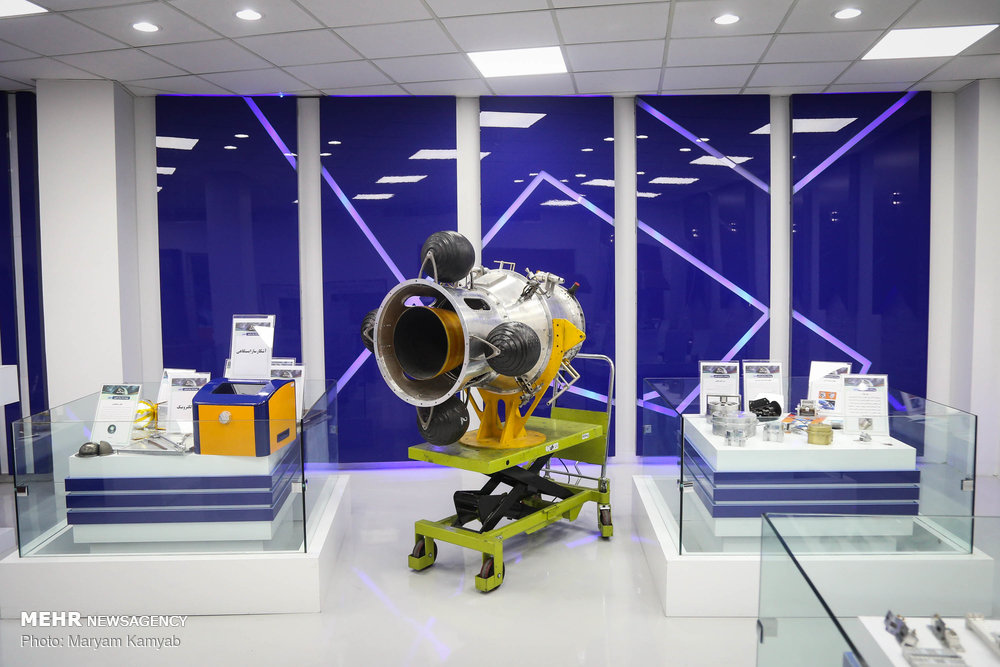
- Saman-1 upper-stage
- Manufacturer: Iranian Space Research Center
- Country of origin: Iran
- Used on: Simorgh (in future); Qased (possibly)

General characteristics
- Gross mass: 240 kg (530 lb)
- Propellant mass: 185 kg (408 lb)
- Empty mass: 55 kg (121 lb)

Arash-24
- Maximum thrust: 13 kN (2,900 lb_{f})
- Burn time: 40 seconds

Associated stages
- Comparable: Star 24

Launch history
- Status: In development

The Saman-1 (Persian: سامان-۱) is a space tug in development by the Iranian Space Research Center to be used to transfer satellites from a 400 km orbit to higher orbits. The system was unveiled on February 1, 2017, by Iranian president Hassan Rouhani in a ceremony marking the Iranian national space technology day.

It could be used as a third stage/kick-motor on the Simorgh launch vehicle. Although very little information has been publicly revealed about the Qased launch vehicle's solid fueled third stage, analysts have concluded that it may uses the Saman-1 as its third stage or something similar.

== Design ==
The saman-1 utilizes an Arash-24 solid fuel motor as its main propulsion unit, producing 1.3 tons of thrust with a burn time of 40 seconds and a total mass of 240 kg fully fueled and 55 kg when empty.

Saman-1 is capable of transferring satellites from a 400 km orbit to a 7,000 km orbit. For its first mission it will be tasked with lifting a 100 kilogram satellite from a 400 kilometer circular parking orbit to an elliptical orbit with an apogee of 700 kilometers and a perigee of 400 kilometers. After the first and second stage burn are done the launch vehicle releases the payload and the Saman-1 third stage into a parking orbit, then the Saman-1 becomes responsible for stabilization and elimination of vibrations after release and finally the accurate injection of its payload into its target orbit.

Several new sub-systems were designed and manufactured for the Saman-1, these include: a complete and independent navigation and control system, a solid-fueled propulsion system (made out of titanium to reduce weight), cold gas thrusters, a power system, and a flight computer.

=== Future versions ===
Saman-2 will be able to transfer satellites from a 400 km orbit (LEO) to a 10,000 km orbit; Saman-3 up to 21,000 km; Saman-4 up to 36,000 km (geostationary and geosynchronous orbits).

== History ==
Saman-1 development began in 2015. The first prototype was unveiled on February 1, 2017, by President Hassan Rouhani. The second prototype was being tested in December 2018. In December 2019, the first sample of the Arash motor was tested successfully in vacuum conditions. A suborbital test flight of Saman-1 occurred in June 2021 and was reported to be successful. A second successful suborbital test took place on 3 October 2022. Operational test flight of the system is planned for 2022–2023.

In 6 December 2024, Simorgh SLV launched Saman-1 orbital transfer block to an altitude of 400 kilometers, along with two other payloads (including the Fakhr-1 satellite), with a total weight of 300 kilograms.

== Gallery ==
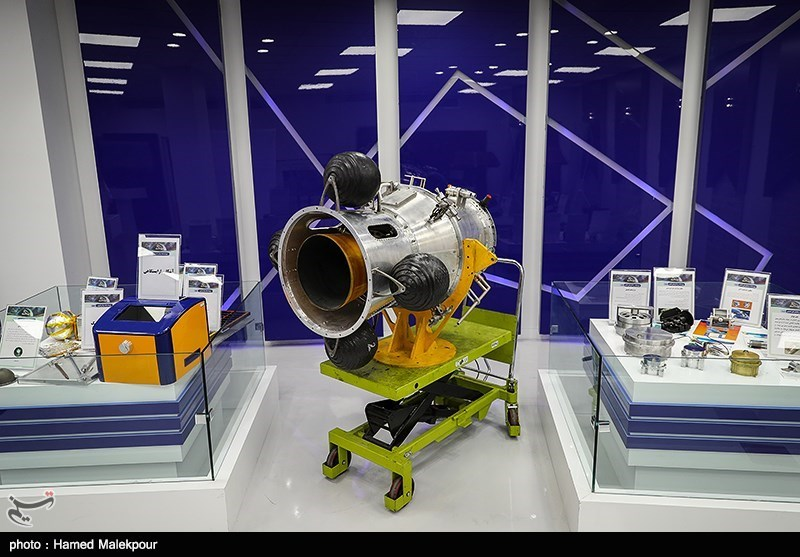
Saman-1 on display at an exhibition

== See also ==
- Simorgh (rocket)
- Qased (rocket)
- Iranian Space Agenecy
- Semnan Space Center
- list of upper-stages
