= Imam Khomeini Space Launch Terminal =

- پایانه فضایی امام خمینی
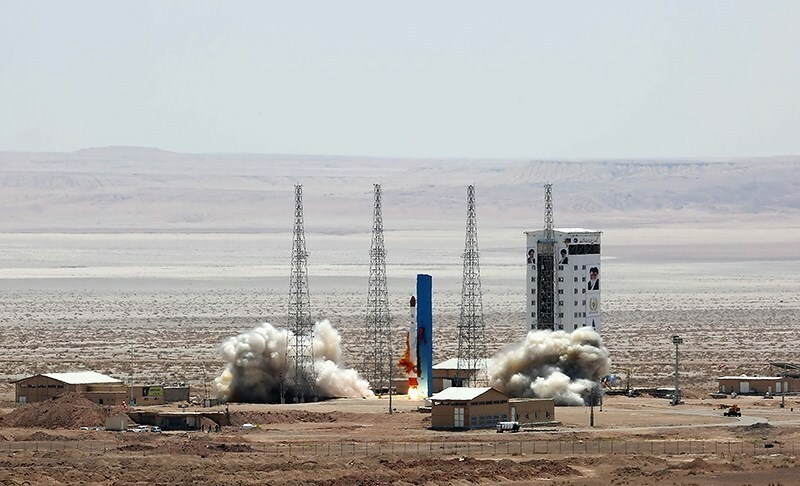

- Location within Iran

General information
- Status: finished
- Location: southeast Semnan, Iran
- Coordinates: 35°14′16.8″N 53°57′02.8″E
- Opened: July 27, 2017; 9 years ago
- Destroyed: March 26, 2026; 7 months ago

Imam Khomeini Space Launch Terminal (Persian:پایانه فضایی امام خمینی) is an Iranian space vehicle launch facility, consisting of the service tower and launch pad used to launch the Simorgh launch vehicle. It is a part of the Semnan Space Center located south-east of the provincial capital of Semnan in Semnan Province. It was ultimately subjected to Airstrike and destroyed on 24 and 26 March 2026, during the 2026 Iran war.

== Destruction ==
Based on satellite imagery analysis published by the International Institute for Strategic Studies (IISS) on 14 October 2026, two Iranian space-launch sites in Semnan Province, the Imam Khomeini Space Centre (Iranian Space Agency) and the Shahroud Space Centre (Islamic Revolutionary Guard Corps), were struck by US and/or Israeli attacks during the 2026 United States–Iran war. The Imam Khomeini Space Centre was hit between 24 and 26 March, with four structures around the Simorgh launch complex assessed as damaged or destroyed, while the separate launch pad used for the Safir and Zoljanah launch vehicles showed no visible damage. At Shahroud, which sits within a complex suspected of also housing a ballistic-missile facility, more than 40 structures were hit between 6 and 10 March, and the assembly building and launch pad were probably also targeted. However, the Safir, Zoljanah, Ghased and Ghaem 100 launch vehicles use mobile-erector-launcher (MEL) trailers and may be able to launch from other locations. IISS concludes that the strikes disrupted both programmes' operations, but that long-term rebuilding is possible and future launches are likely to be handed to Russia.

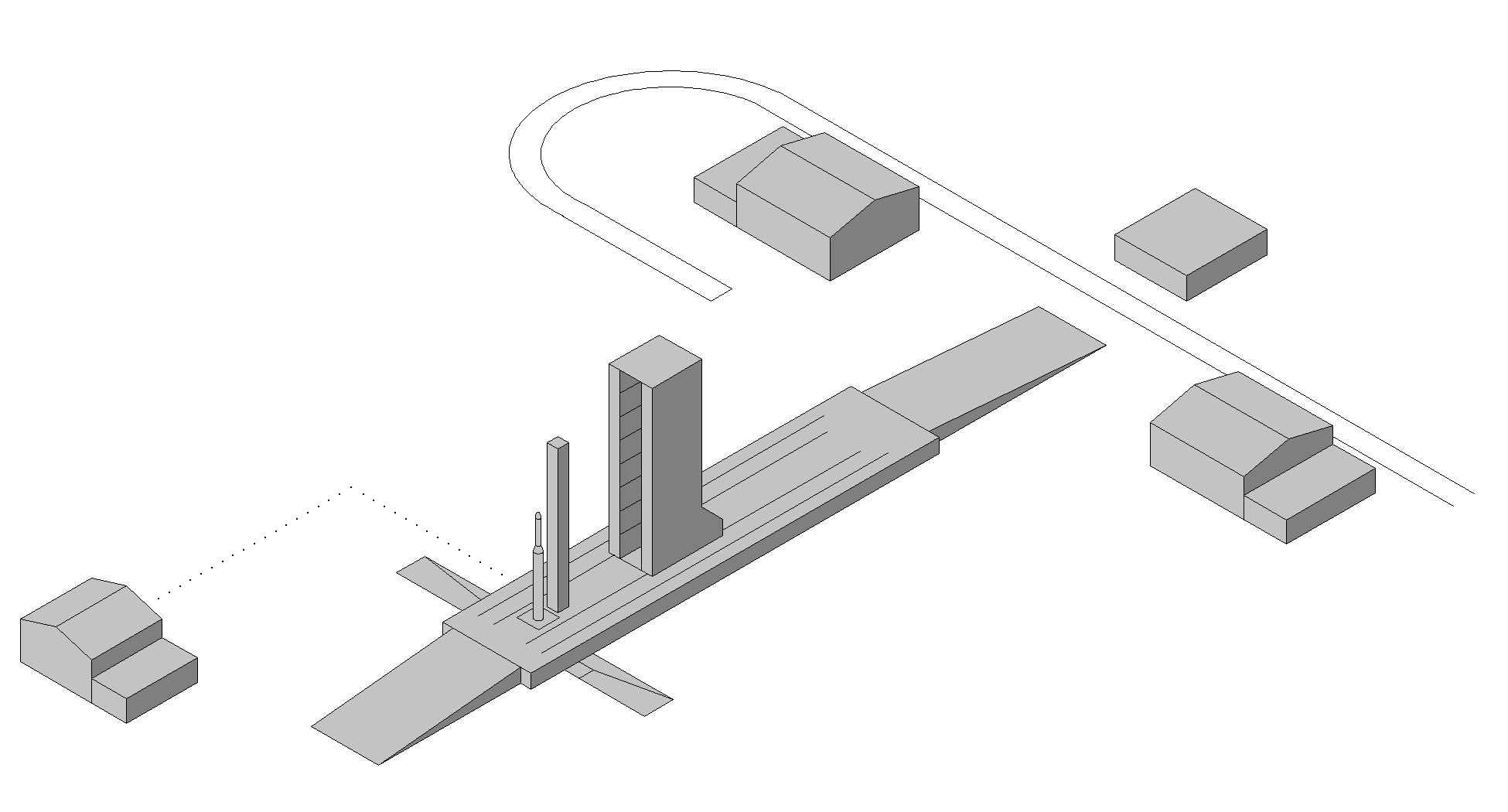
Simorgh Launch Pad at Imam Khomeini Space Launch Terminal

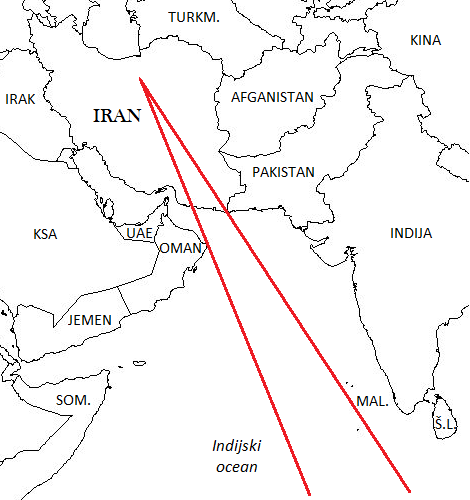
Launch Corridor of the Imam Khomeini Space Launch Terminal

== Launch history ==
Flight N^{o}	Date & Time (GMT)	Payload	Type	Outcome	Remarks
1	19 April 2016	No Payload	Simorgh	Success	Sub-orbital test flight
2	27 July 2017	No Payload	Simorgh	Failure	Official opening, Test flight; second stage failed
3	15 January 2019	Payam (named "AUT-SAT" previously)	Simorgh	Failure	Third stage failure.
4	9 February 2020 - 15:45	Zafar 1	Simorgh	Failure	Failed to reach orbit.
5	12 June 2021	Unknown payload	Simorgh	Failure	Failed to reach orbit.
6	30 December 2021	3 unknown payloads	Simorgh	Failure	Iranian state media reported a successful flight, but no objects were detected in orbit following this launch. Reported apogee: 470 km.
7	28 January 2024	3 satellites	Simorgh	Success	First successful orbital launch of Simorgh. Carried the Hatef-1, Keyhan-2 and Mahda satellites.
8	6 December 2024	2 Satellites, and Saman-1 space tug	Simorgh	Success	First successful launch equipped with Saman-1 space tug, inserting two satellites into orbit with an apogee of 410 km and perigee of 300 kilometers.

== See also ==
- Iranian Space Agency
- Semnan Space Center
- Simorgh (rocket)
