= Semnan Space Center =

Iranian Space Center

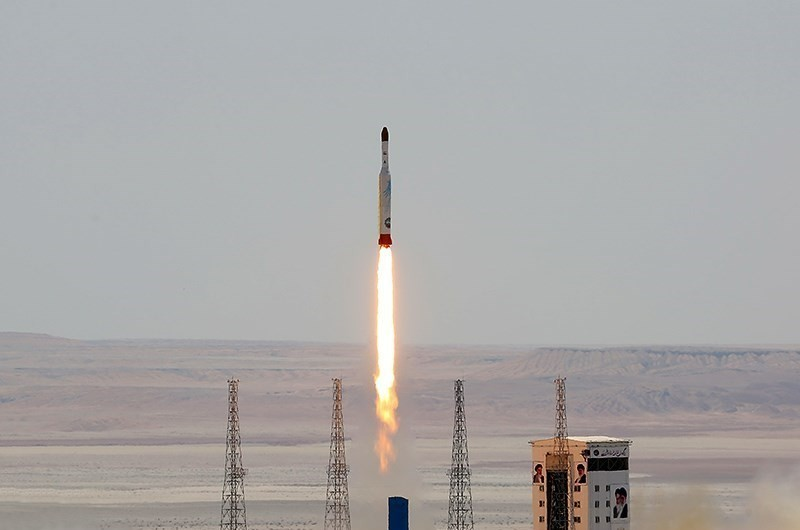
- Launch of the Simorgh rocket

Agency overview
- Formed: 1 February 2004
- Type: Space agency
- Headquarters: Semnan, Semnan Province; 35.2346°N 53.9221°E
- Administrator: Iranian Space Agency
- Primary spaceport: Imam Khomeini Space Launch Terminal
- Owner: Iranian Space Agency
- Website: isa.ir

Map
- Location within Iran

Semnan Space Center (Persian:مرکز فضایی سمنان) is the primary Iranian spaceport, located 50 km (31 mi; 27 nmi) southeast of the city of Semnan in the north of the country.

== History ==
Media attention on the space center began when Iranian authorities announced their intent to launch an artificial satellite within weeks on 16 August 2008. On 17 August 2008, Iran proceeded, as preannounced, with the second test launch of a three-stage Safir SLV from a site 35°14′5″N 53°55′15″E south of Semnan in the northern part of the Dasht-e-Kavir desert. Reza Taghizadeh, head of the Iranian Aerospace Organization, told state television "The Safir (Ambassador) satellite carrier was launched today and for the first time we successfully launched a dummy satellite into orbit". As reported in late 2009 and early 2010, a new, larger launch pad was under construction at 35°15′30″N 53°57′17″E.

== Launch sites ==
=== Circular launch platform ===
The Circular Launch Platform is the oldest launch pad and also recognizable by the light blue background with the original logo of the Iran Space Agency (ISA).The platform has a simplified character and consists of a leveled terrain with a circular asphalted section of a diameter of 65 m, at the center of which is a service tower.

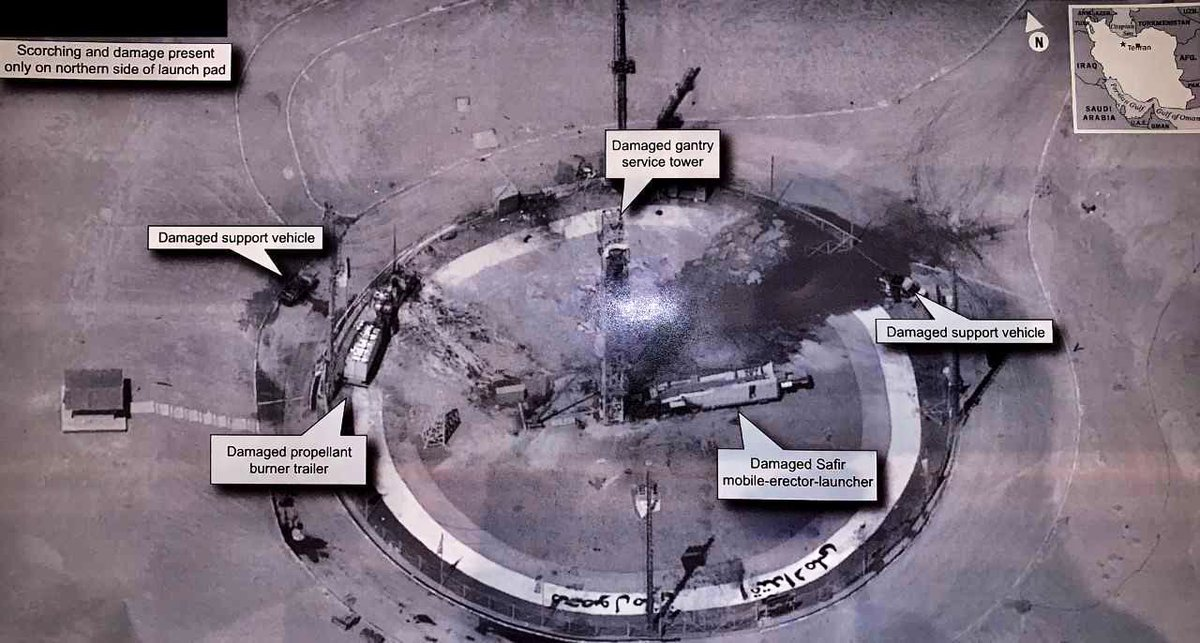
Circular Launch Platform after a launch failure.

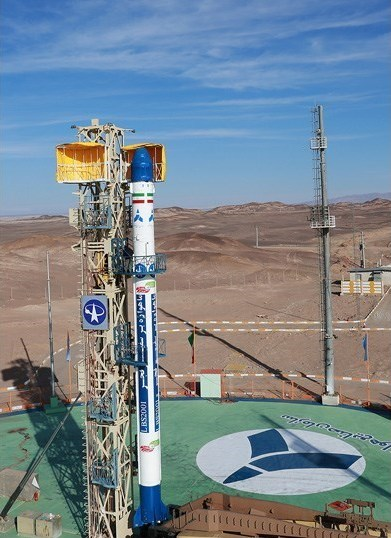
Safir rocket on the Circular Launch Platform.

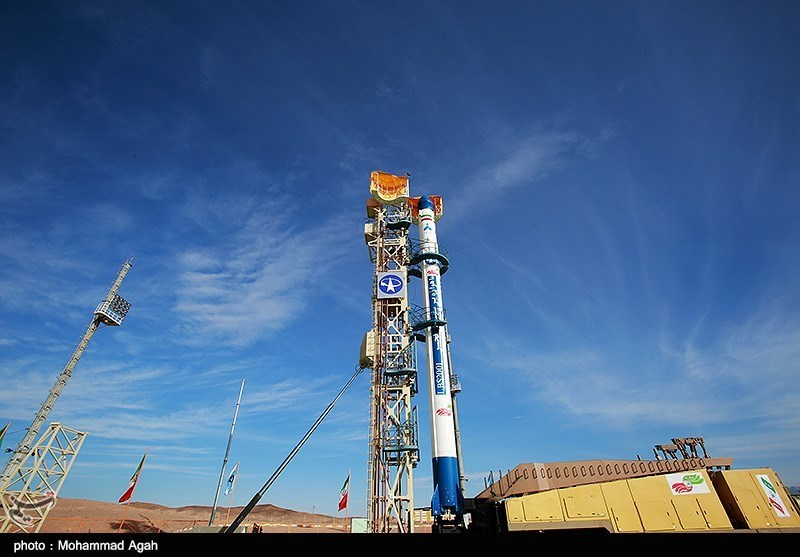
Safir rocket on the Circular Launch Platform.

=== Main Launch Platform ===
The Main Launch Platform (Imam Khomeini Space Launch Terminal) is located at the east of the complex on a specially enclosed octagonal area measuring 900 x 660 m and covering an area of 51.4 ha, representing the largest single element of the new space center. The units are accessed by a road from the northwest, which is within the perimeter of the three rays and forms two main inner zones – almost completely built lower and newly initiated upper (state of 2015). The lower zone consists of spacious launching platforms with towers and four larger compartments for installation and storage.

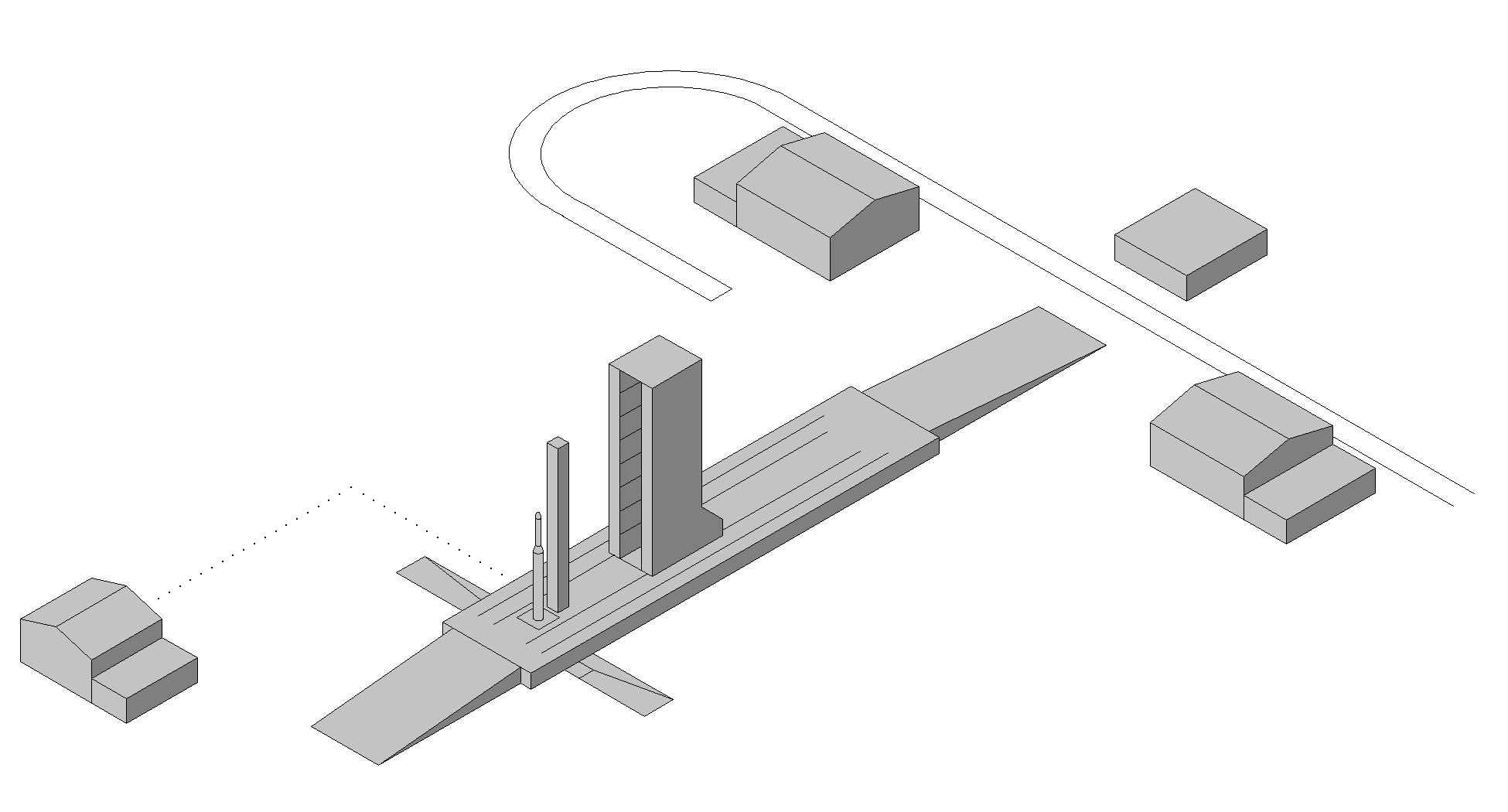
An axonometric sketch of the Main Launch Platform, left to right:
- fuel tank (piped drains)
- launch ramp with Simorgh
- auxiliary service facilities.

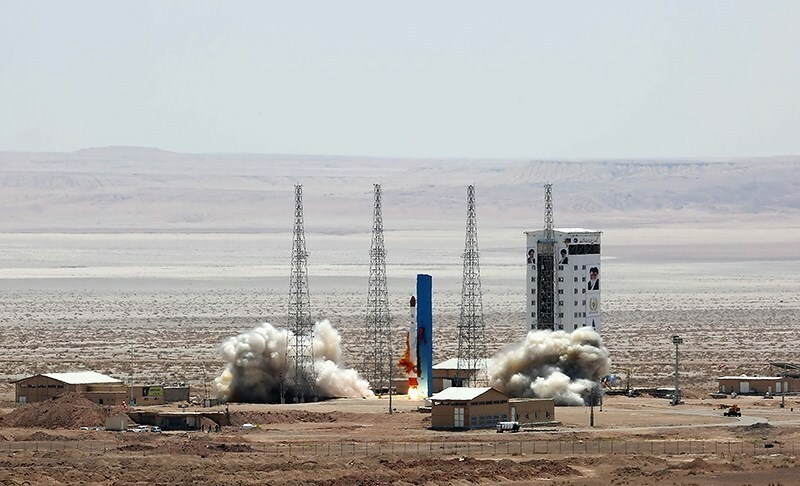
Simorgh launching from Main Launch Platform, 2017.

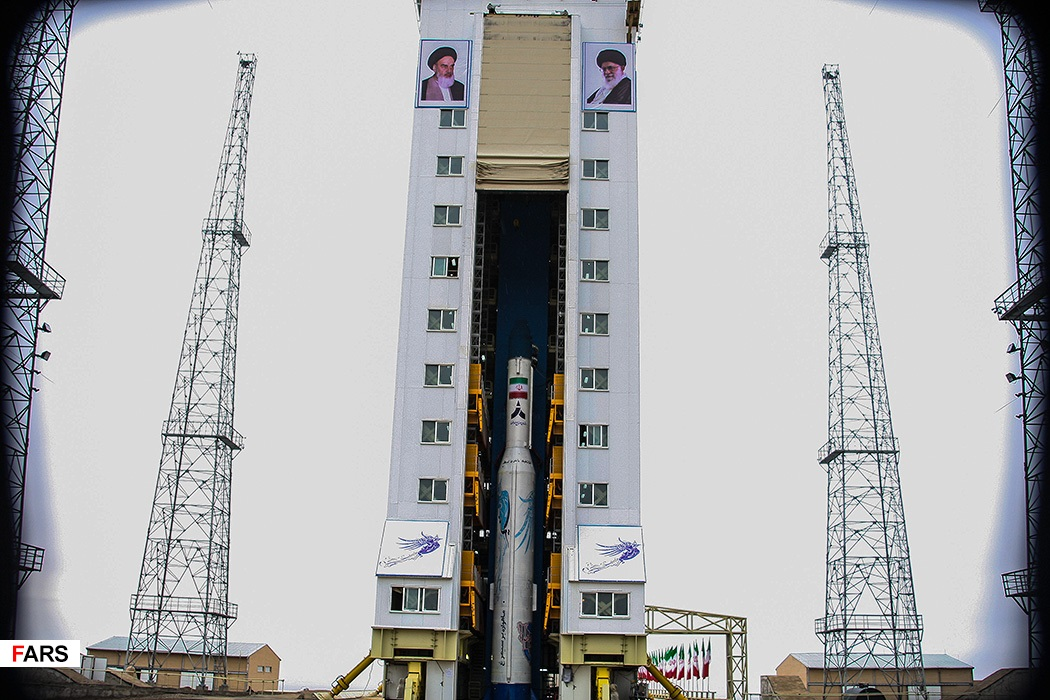
Simorgh launcher with the Payam satellite at Main Launch Platform, 2019

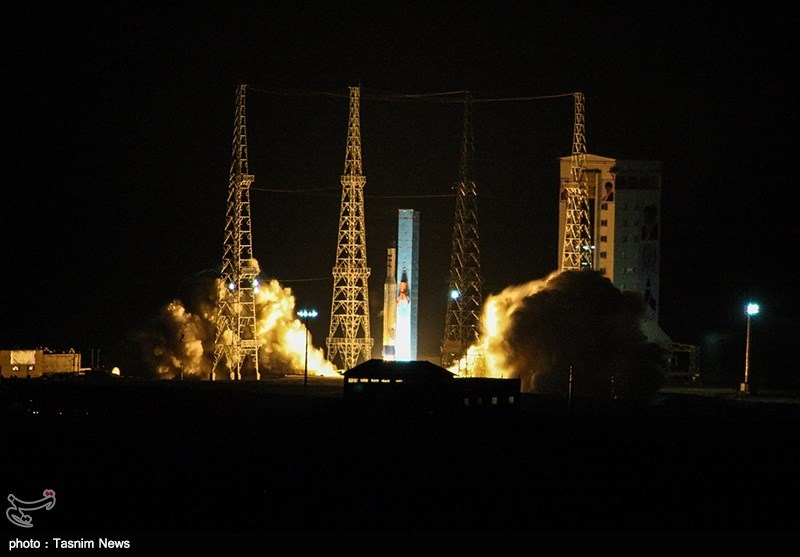
Simorgh launching from the Main Launch Platform, 2019.

Map of the Semnan Space Center
Legend: Road communication Main facilities and installations Inclination launch (55°-66°) Installations: (A) - Antennas for communications (35°11′34″N 53°56′21″E) (E) - Distribution substations (35°14′42″N 53°53′48″E) (K) - Circular launch pad (35°14′5″N 53°55′15″E) (L) - Main launch pad (35°14′14″N 53°57′0″E) (M) - Drive mounting rocket (35°14′53″N 53°54′46″E) (O) - Operations Center (35°14′41″N 53°56′6″E) (P) - Polygon ballistic missiles (35°13′46″N 53°51′58″E) (T) - Test center for rocket motors (35°15′31″N 53°57′15″E) (U) - Administrative Center (35°15′15″N 53°54′0″E) (V) - Military administrative and technical center (35°13′21″N 53°53′45″E)

== Launch history ==
Date	Carrier rocket	Payload	Pad	Outcome	Note
November 2, 2006	Kavoshgar-1 (A)	No Payload	mobile	Success	Atmospheric flight (v = 10 km)
February 25, 2007	Kavoshgar-1	Kavosh	mobile	Success	First Mesosphere flight
February 4, 2008	Kavoshgar-1	No Payload	mobile	Success	First flight above Kármán line
August 16, 2008	Safir-1	DemoSat	circular	Success	First Iranian object in Orbit
November 26, 2008	Kavoshgar-2 (B)	Empty bio capsule	mobile	Success	Atmospheric flight (v = 40 km)
February 2, 2009	Safir-1	Omid	circular	Success	First operational Iranian Satellite
February 3, 2010	Kavoshgar-3 (B)	Poikilotherm	mobile	Success	Atmospheric flight (v = 55 km)
March 15, 2011	Kavoshgar-4 (C)	Empty bio capsule	mobile	Success	Suborbital flight (v = 135 km)
June 15, 2011	Safir-1A	Rasad 1	circular	Success	Operating satellite
September 15, 2011	Kavoshgar-5 (C)	bio capsule	mobile	Failure	Suborbital flight (v = 120 km)
February 3, 2012	Safir-1B	Navid	circular	Success	Operating satellite
May 23, 2012	Kavoshgar-6 (C)	DemoSat	mobile	Failure	Suborbital flight (v = 120 km)
January 28, 2013	Kavoshgar-7 (C)	Pishgam	mobile	Success	Suborbital flight (v = 120 km)
December 14, 2013	Kavoshgar-8 (D)	Fargam	circular	Success	Suborbital flight (v = 120 km)
February 2, 2015	Safir-1B	Fajr	circular	Success	Satellite orbited for 24 days prior to re-entry
April 19, 2016	Simorgh	No Payload	Main	Success	Suborbital flight
July 27, 2017	Simorgh	No Payload	Main	Failure	Test flight; failure shortly after liftoff
January 15, 2019	Simorgh	AUTSAT ("Project Payam")	Main	Failure	Third stage failed
February 5, 2019	Safir	Doosti	Main	Failure	Launch failure
February 9, 2020	Simorgh	Zafar-1	Main	Partial failure	Satellite fails to reach orbit
31 January or 1 February 2021	Zuljanah	Test payload	circular	Success	Successful first test flight of Zuljanah. Sub-orbital. Apogee 500 km.
June 12, 2021	Simorgh	Unknown payload	Main	Failure	Failed to reach orbit.
December 30, 2021	Simorgh	3 unknown payloads	Main	Failure	Iranian state media reported a successful flight, but no objects were detected in orbit following this launch. Reported apogee: 470 km (290 mi).
June 26, 2022	Zuljanah		circular	Success	Successful second test flight of Zuljanah. Sub-orbital.
December 6, 2023	Salman	Bio-capsule	circular	Success	Successful maiden flight of Salman. Sub-orbital (v = 130 km).
January 28, 2024	Simorgh	3 satellites	Main	Success	First successful orbital flight of Simorgh. Carried the Hatef-1, Keyhan-2 and Mahda satellites.
December 6, 2024	Simorgh	Fakhr-1 military Communications Satellite, one research satellite	Main	Success	First Successful launch equipped with Saman-1 space tug, inserting two satellites into orbit with an apogee of 410km and perigee of 300 kilometers.
