= Rasad 1 =

Iranian satellite

- Mission type: Observation
- Operator: Iranian Space Agency
- COSPAR ID: 2011-025A
- SATCAT no.: 37675
- Mission duration: 3 weeks

Spacecraft properties
- Launch mass: 15.3 kilograms (34 lb)

Start of mission
- Launch date: 15 June 2011, 09:14 UTC
- Rocket: Safir-1A
- Launch site: Semnan Space Center

End of mission
- Decay date: 6 July 2011

Orbital parameters
- Reference system: Geocentric
- Regime: Low Earth
- Perigee altitude: 233 kilometres (145 mi)
- Apogee altitude: 271 kilometres (168 mi)
- Inclination: 55.6 degrees
- Period: 89.54 minutes
- Mean motion: 16.08
- Epoch: 22 June 2011

Rasad-1 (Persian: رصد, meaning Observation) was an Iranian satellite which was launched in 2011.

== Satellite ==
The third Iranian satellite, and the second to be launched successfully using an indigenous rocket, Rasad-1 was Iran's first imaging satellite. Launched aboard a Safir-B carrier rocket, it was successfully placed into a low Earth orbit at an altitude of 236 by 299 kilometres (147 by 186 mi), inclined at 55.7 degrees. It made approximately fifteen orbits per day.

Rasad-1 was launched on the maiden flight of the Safir-B rocket, designated Safir-B1, from a launch site in Semnan province, Iran. The launch occurred at approximately 09:14 UTC on 15 June 2011 with the spacecraft reaching orbit several minutes later.

The satellite had a mass of 15.3 kilograms (34 lb) and returned images with a resolution of 150 metres (490 ft). It was equipped with solar panels to generate power. The satellite decayed from orbit three weeks after launch, on 6 July 2011.

Rasad 1 Telemetry
AFSK Telemetry recorded from the Rasad 1 satellite on 465Mhz.

== See also ==
- Omid
