= Fajr (satellite) =

2015 imaging satellite of the Iranian Space Agency

- Mission type: Optical imaging Technology
- Operator: ISA
- COSPAR ID: 2015-006A
- SATCAT no.: 40387
- Mission duration: 24 days 1.5 years (planned)

Spacecraft properties
- Launch mass: 52 kg

Start of mission
- Launch date: 2 February 2015, 08:50:00 UTC
- Rocket: Safir-1B
- Launch site: Semnan Space Center

End of mission
- Decay date: 26 February 2015

Orbital parameters
- Reference system: Geocentric
- Regime: Low Earth
- Perigee altitude: 224 km
- Apogee altitude: 470 km
- Inclination: 55.53°
- Period: 91.5 minutes
- Epoch: 2 February 2015

Fajr (Persian: فجر, meaning "dawn") is an Iranian satellite which was launched on 2 February 2015. Fajr had a mass of 52 kg and was equipped with an optical imaging payload which would have reached a ground resolution of about 500 metres (1,600 ft).

== Satellite ==
It is the first Iranian satellite to use a cold-gas thruster system, to conduct orbital maneuvers and increase its service life by raising its orbit to prevent a fast decay. An experimental GPS system developed by Iran is also part of the spacecraft. The Fajr satellite is expected to operate for 1.5 years. The satellite body is a 6-sided prism with a height of 49 centimetres (19 in) and a width of 35 centimetres (14 in).

Fajr was launched by a Safir-1B rocket from the Iranian Space Agency's launch site in Semnan province. The launch took place at around 08:50:00 UTC on 2 February 2015, Iran's national day of space and the sixth anniversary of the country's first successful orbital launch. The satellite was deployed into a low Earth orbit with a perigee of 224 km, an apogee of 470 km, an inclination of 55.53°, and an orbital period of 91.5 minutes. Fajr reentered in the Earth's atmosphere on 26 February 2015 after 23.8 days in orbit. Apparently, it performed no maneuvers during its orbital lifetime.
