= Zuljanah (rocket) =

Iranian small-lift launch vehicle

Zuljanah Satellite Launch Vehicle
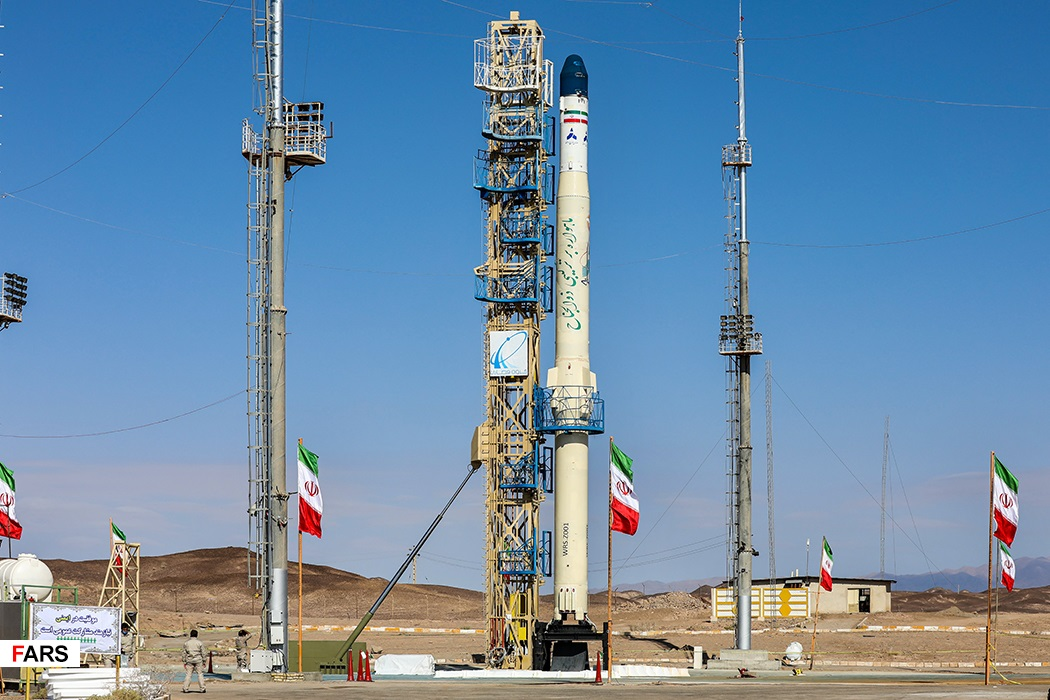
- Zuljanah Satellite Launch Vehicle
- Manufacturer: Ministry of Defence and Armed Forces Logistics (Iran)
- Country of origin: Iran

Size
- Height: 25.5 meters
- Diameter: 1.5 meters
- Mass: 52 tons
- Stages: 3 (1st & 2nd Solid; 3rd Liquid)

Capacity

Payload to low Earth orbit
- Mass: 220 kg (490 lb)

Launch history
- Status: Under Development
- Launch sites: Semnan Space Center
- Total launches: 0 (+2 suborbital)
- Success(es): 0 (+2 suborbital)
- Failure: 1

First stage
- Powered by: 1 × unnamed solid fuel engine
- Maximum thrust: 725 kN (163,000 lb_{f})
- Propellant: solid

Second stage
- Powered by: 1 × unnamed solid fuel engine
- Maximum thrust: 725 kN (163,000 lb_{f})
- Propellant: solid

Third stage
- Powered by: 2 × LRE-4 (R-27 Zyb vernier engines)
- Maximum thrust: 35 kN (7,900 lb_{f})
- Propellant: N_{2}O_{4} / UDMH

Zuljanah (Persian: ماهواره‌بر ذوالجناح), also spelled Zoljanah (and with a host of other spellings appearing sporadically), is an Iranian Satellite Launch Vehicle (SLV), made by the Ministry of Defence and Armed Forces Logistics (Iran), which was unveiled on 1 February 2021, and was launched (at an unknown time before 1 February 2021, possibly 31 January 2021) into sub-orbital flight (apogee 500km) for testing and telemetry purposes. Zuljanah is able to carry satellites weighing up to 220kg into an orbit 500 kilometers above the Earth.

According to Seyed Ahmad Husseini, the space spokesman of the Ministry of Defense: The Zuljanah SLV is part of a larger project called "Hazrat Fatemeh Al-Zahra" (Persian: حضرت فاطمه الزهراء). This SLV is considered to be the first indigenously designed and manufactured "hybrid" fuel satellite launch vehicle (solid/liquid fuel). As of June 2022, two more test flights are planned.

== Design ==
Zuljanah measures 25.5 meters (84ft) in length and has a mass of 52 tons (115,000lbs). The first and second stages utilize an identical 1.5m diameter solid-fuel engine with 74 tons (725 kN; 163,000 lbf) of thrust and a Safir type 1.25m diameter liquid-fuel (UDMH /N_{2}O_{4}) engine with a thrust of 3.5 tons (35 kN; 7,800 lbf) as a third stage. Zuljanah is capable of carrying a single satellite weighing up to 220kg or a constellation of ten smaller 20kg cubesats to Low-Earth Orbit.

Zuljanah is the third civilian Satellite Launch Vehicle made in Iran, after the Safir and Simorgh. It is road-mobile, requires very little fueling time, and can be launched by Transporter-Erector Launchers (TELs), raising alarms from US and EU European defense analysts about its possible covert nature as Iran's first IRBM.

== Launch history ==
Flight No.	Date & Time (UTC)	Payload	Outcome	Remarks
1	31 January 2021	Unknown; may be boilerplate	Success	First sub-orbital test flight
2	26 June 2022	Unknown	Success	Second sub-orbital test flight
3	18 September 2025; 15:00	Unknown	Launch Failure	Possibly first orbital launch attempt or third sub-orbital test flight

== Gallery ==
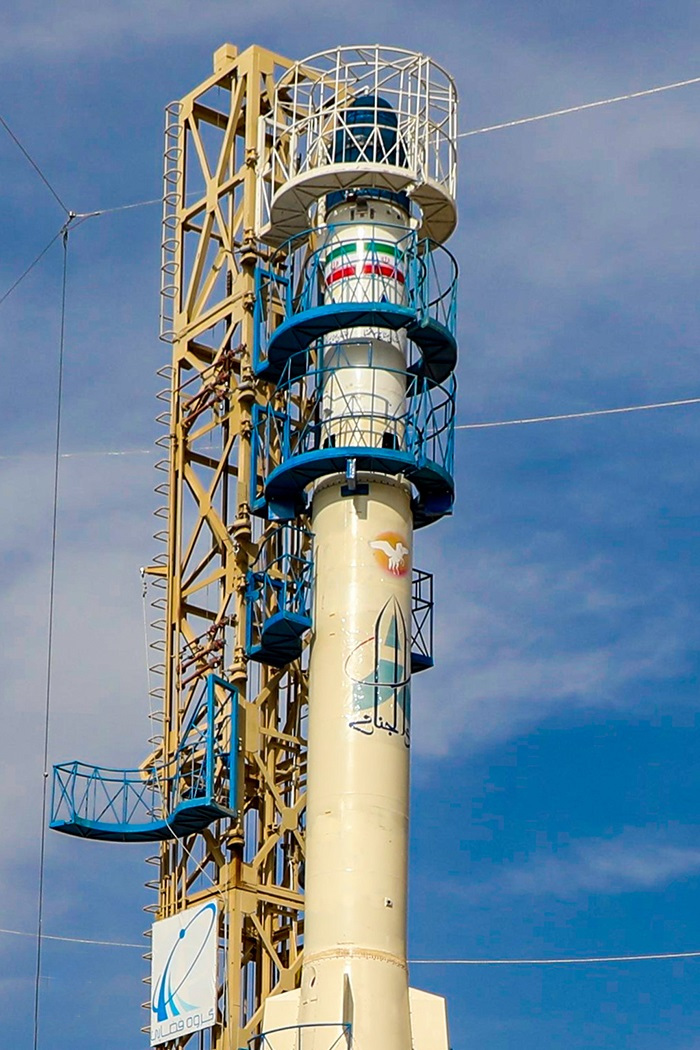
Zuljanah being held by the servicing tower

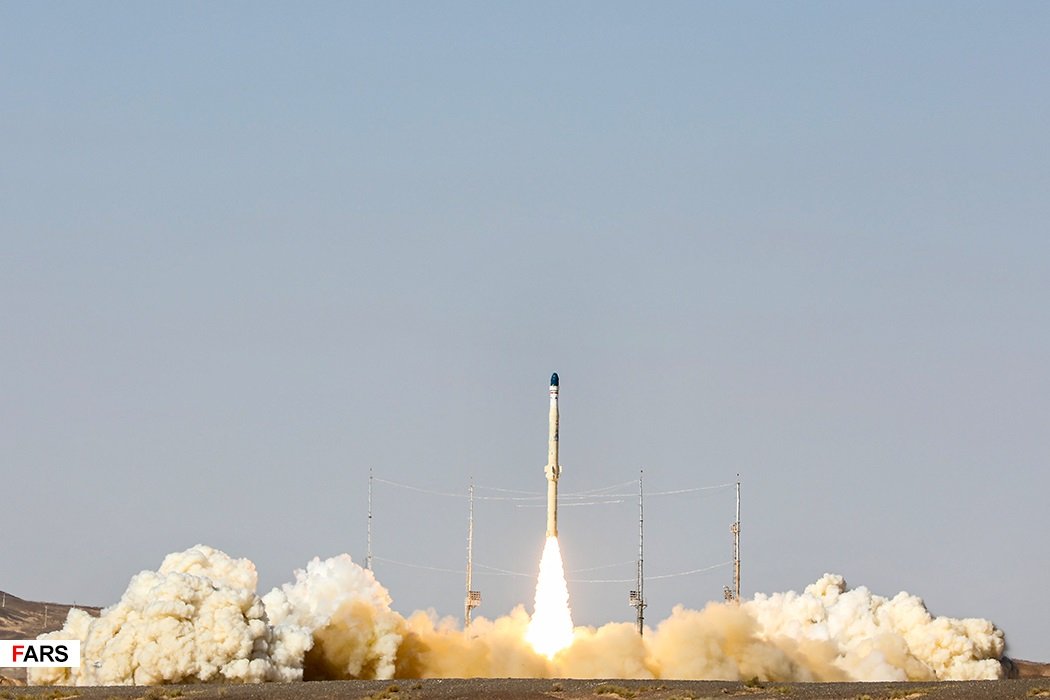
Zuljanah lifting off from the launch pad

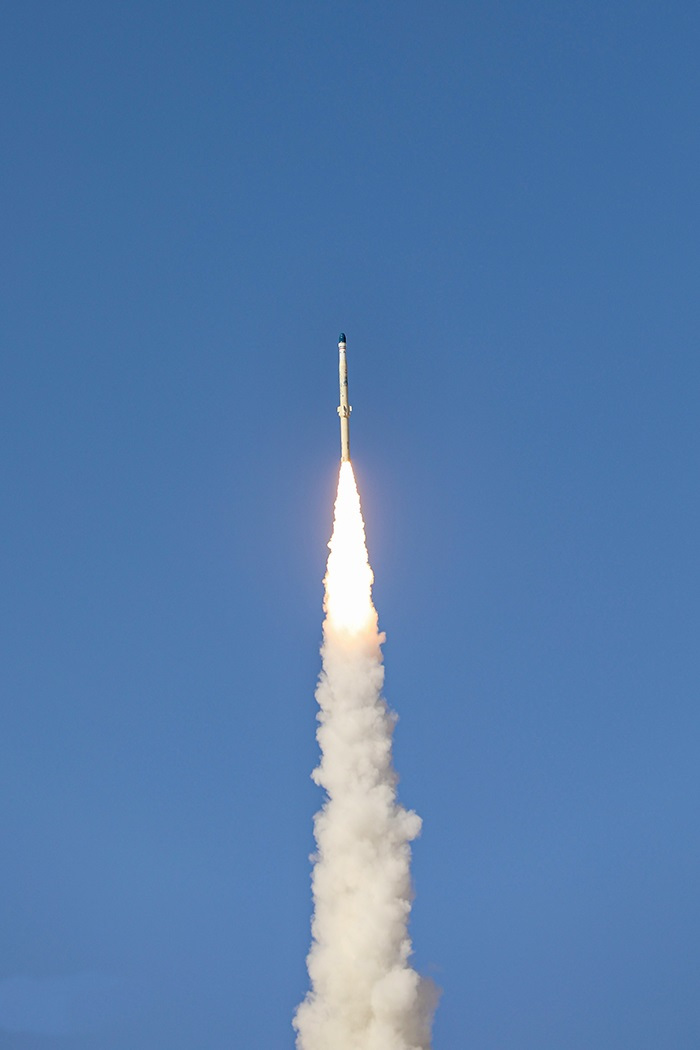
Zuljanah in flight

== See also ==
- Iranian Space Agency
- Semnan Space Center

Other Iranian satellite launch vehicles

- Safir (rocket)
- Simorgh (rocket)
- Qased (rocket)
- Qaem-100 (rocket)
