= Jielong 1 =

Orbital launch vehicle

- Function: Small orbital launch vehicle
- Manufacturer: CALT
- Country of origin: China

Size
- Height: 19.5 m (64 ft)
- Diameter: 1.2 m (3.9 ft)
- Mass: 23,100 kg (50,900 lb)
- Stages: 4

Capacity

Payload to SSO 500 km
- Mass: 200 kg (440 lb)

Payload to SSO 700 km
- Mass: 150 kg (330 lb)

Associated rockets
- Comparable: Minotaur I Pegasus; Start-1; Electron

Launch history
- Status: Retired
- Launch sites: Jiuquan
- Total launches: 1
- Success(es): 1
- First flight: 17 August 2019

Jielong 1 (Chinese: 捷龙一号运载火箭, meaning "agile dragon", also known as Smart Dragon 1, SD-1), is a solid fueled orbital launch vehicle developed by China Academy of Launch Vehicle Technology's subsidiary China Rocket to launch up to 150 kg to a 700 km altitude Sun-synchronous orbit. The rocket is 19.5 meters tall, 1.2 meters in diameter and weighs 23.1 metric tons. It is a solid fuel, 4 stage orbital rocket.

== History ==
The development of the rocket took 18 months (initiated in February 2018); the rocket uses propulsion technology from Chinese missile programs. The program aimed to produce a launch vehicle with launch price per mass of $US 30,000/kg, or $6 million for the launch.

The launch vehicle features an inverted-position fourth stage motor and payload space during the initial portion of the launch sequence; the stack rotates to front after third stage separation.

The maiden flight of Jielong 1 on 17 August 2019, 04:11 UTC was successful. It delivered three small satellites into polar orbit. The satellites were the Xingshidai 5 Earth observation satellite, Tianqi 2 experimental satellite and a third small Earth observing satellite Qiancheng 01 from Qiansheng Exploration Technology Co. Ltd. The launch took place from Jiuquan, with the rocket taking off from a road-mobile transporter.

== List of launches ==
Flight number	Flight	Date (UTC)	Launch site	Payload	Orbit	Outcome
1	Y1	August 17, 2019; 04:11	JSLC	Qiancheng 01; Xingshidai 5 Tianqi 2	SSO	Success

== See also ==
- Jielong 3
