= Navid (satellite) =

Iranian Earth observation satellite

- Operator: Iranian Space Agency (ISA)
- COSPAR ID: 2012-005A
- SATCAT no.: 38075
- Mission duration: 2 months

Spacecraft properties
- Launch mass: 50 kilograms (110 lb)

Start of mission
- Launch date: February 3, 2012, 00:04 UTC
- Rocket: Safir-1B
- Launch site: Semnan, Iran

End of mission
- Decay date: 1 April 2012

Orbital parameters
- Reference system: Geocentric
- Regime: Low Earth
- Perigee altitude: 250 kilometres (160 mi)
- Apogee altitude: 375 kilometres (233 mi)
- Inclination: 55 degrees
- Period: 90 minutes

Navid (Persian: نوید) or Navid-e Elm-o San'at (نوید علم و صنعت, "Promise of Science and Technology") was an experimental Iranian Earth observation satellite.

== Satellite ==
The satellite carried a camera for taking higher resolution imagery of Earth and it was also used to collect weather data and monitor natural disasters. Navid satellite weighing 50 kilograms, the third satellite to be launched indigenously by Iran, it was placed into orbit by a new configuration of the Safir carrier rocket, featuring a larger second stage with 20% more thrust. The launch occurred at approximately 00:04 UTC on 3 February 2012. The satellite remained in orbit for two months, before reentering the atmosphere on 1 April 2012.

== See also ==
- Iranian Space Agency
