= Safir (rocket) =

Iranian satellite rocket

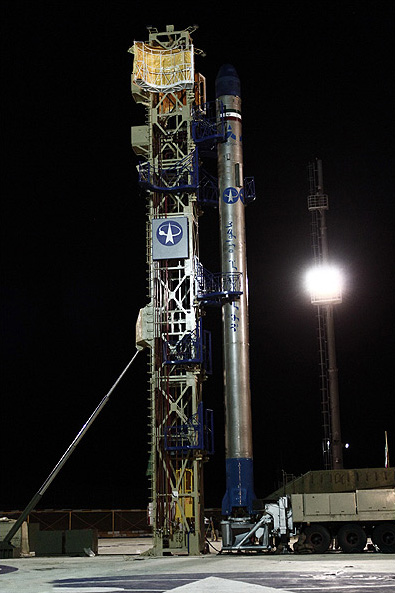
- Safir's 2012 launch from Semnan Space Center with Navid satellite as its payload
- Function: LEO launch vehicle
- Manufacturer: Iranian Space Agency
- Country of origin: Iran

Size
- Height: 22 m (72ft)
- Diameter: 1.25 m (4.10ft)
- Mass: 26,000 kg
- Stages: 2

Capacity

Payload to LEO
- Mass: 50 kilograms (110 lb)

Launch history
- Status: Retired
- Launch sites: Semnan Space Center
- Total launches: 7 (1 unconfirmed) (+2 test flights)
- Success(es): 4
- Failure: 3 (1 unconfirmed)
- First flight: 17 August 2008
- Last flight: 5 February 2019

First stage
- Powered by: 1 × modified Shahab-3 engine
- Maximum thrust: 363 kN (82,000 lb_{f})
- Propellant: N_{2}O_{4} / UDMH

Second stage
- Powered by: 2 × LRE-4 (R-27 Zyb vernier engines)
- Maximum thrust: 35 kN (7,900 lb_{f})
- Propellant: N_{2}O_{4} / UDMH

The Safir (Persian: سفیر, meaning "ambassador") was the first Iranian expendable launch vehicle able to place a satellite in orbit. The first successful orbital launch using the Safir launch system took place on 2 February 2009 when a Safir carrier rocket placed the Omid satellite into an orbit with a 245.2 km (152.4 mi) apogee. This made Iran the ninth nation capable of producing and launching a satellite.

The Simorgh is a larger orbital launcher based on Safir technology which has since replaced the Safir, and is sometimes called the Safir-2.

== Design and specifications ==
The Safir measures 1.25 meters in diameter, 22 meters in height and has a launching mass of 26 tons. The rocket consists of two stages; The first stage utilizes an upgraded Nodong/Shahab-3 type engine which burns a hypergolic combination of UDMH as fuel and nitrogen tetroxide as oxidant, producing 37 tons (363 kN; 82,500 lbf) of thrust. The second stage utilizes a pair of smaller gimballed engines called LRE-4, fed by a common turbopump (originally the Vernier engines of the R-27 Zyb Soviet SLBM) burning the same fuel combination as the first stage and producing 3.5 tons (35 kN; 7700 lbf) of thrust. This configuration gives Safir the ability to inject a payload with a maximum weight of 50 kilograms into low Earth orbit.

== Variants ==
=== Kavoshgar-1 ===
Kavoshgar-1 (Persian: کاوشگر ۱, "Explorer-1") was Safir's precursor used as a sounding rocket, a sub-orbital flight was conducted on 4 February 2008, as announced by state-run television. A launch on 25 February 2007 may also have been of the same type. The flight carried instruments to measure the higher atmosphere. The rocket launched on 4 February 2008 was a liquid-propellant-driven rocket, a derivative of the Shahab-3, that reached an altitude of 200–250 km in space, and successfully returned science data according to the Iranian News Agency.

On 19 February 2008, Iran offered new information about the rocket and announced that Kavoshgar-1 used a two staged rocket. The first stage separated after 100 seconds and returned to earth with the help of a parachute. The second stage continued its ascent to an altitude of 200 kilometers.

=== Safir-1A ===
The Safir-1A is the first upgraded variant of the original Safir, these upgrades include, refinement of the second stage retro-rockets, stage separation systems, various sensors and telemetry systems, navigation and control systems, as well as increasing maximum orbit height from 250 to 275 kilometers.

=== Safir-1B ===
The Safir-1B is a further upgrade of the Safir-1A design, the first-stage engine has been upgraded and refined, resulting in an increase in thrust from 32 to 37 tons (363 kN; 82,500 lbf), the second stage engine has been upgraded with thrust vector control capability and has been made more efficient. These upgrades have increased payload capability to 50 kilograms, and have increased maximum orbit height to 400 kilometers.

== Retirement ==
During the unveiling ceremony of the Zuljanah satellite launch vehicle on the state TV, Seyed Ahmad Husseini, the spokesman of the Ministry of Defense's Aerospace Organization stated that the Safir launch vehicle is in a state of retirement and no further launches are planned with this vehicle.

== Launch history ==
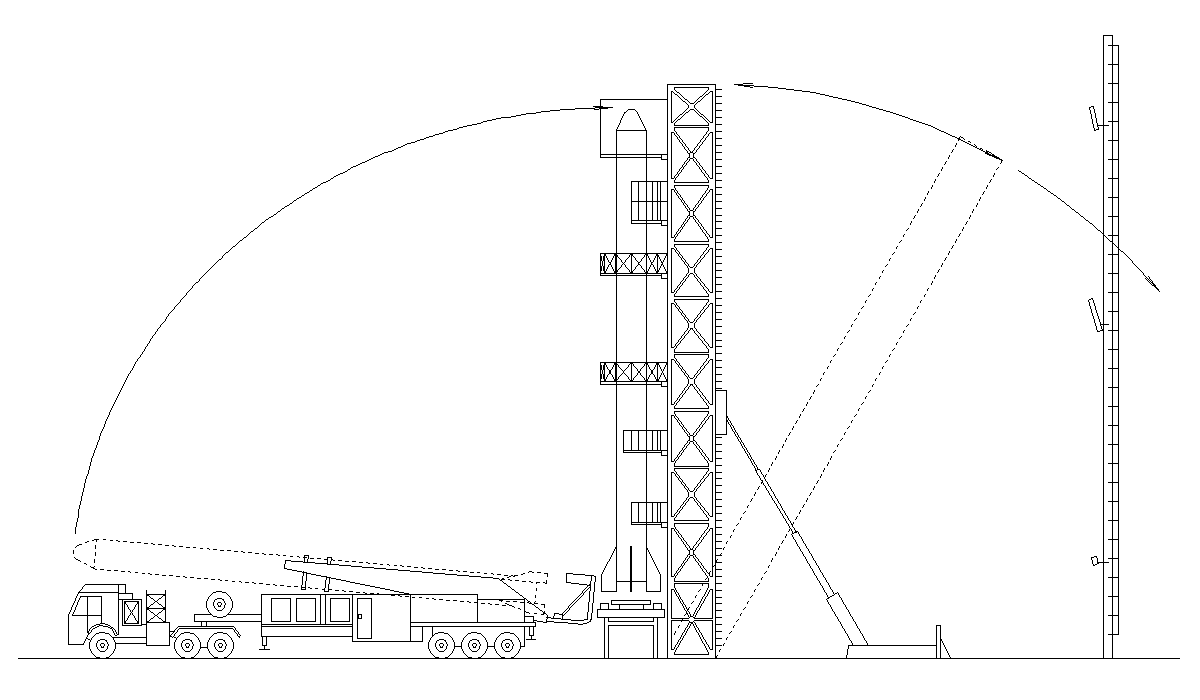
Safir Launch Pad Configuration

Safir made eight launches in its operational career, putting four satellites into orbit.

Test flights
Flight no.	Date & time (UTC)	Payload		Configuration	Outcome	Remarks	
1	4 February 2008	Unknown		Kavoshgar-1	Success	Successful suborbital test flight of Safir's precursor.	
2	17 August 2008	Unknown; may be boilerplate		Safir-1	Maybe	Iranian officials assert it was a successful suborbital test carrying a boilerplate satellite. US defense officials assert the vehicle failed after first-stage powered flight.	
Operational flights
Flight no.	Date & time (UTC)	Payload		Configuration	Outcome	Achieved orbit	Remarks
1	2 February 2009	(Iran) Omid	27 kg	Safir-1	Success	381.2 x 245.5 km, i 55.71°	First successful orbital launch of Safir making Iran the ninth country to develop an indigenous satellite launch capability.
2	15 June 2011	(Iran) Rasad	15.3 kg	Safir-1A	Success	271 x 233 km, i 55.6°	Rasad-1 was launched on the maiden flight of the Safir-1A
3	3 February 2012	(Iran) Navid	50 kg	Safir-1B	Success	375 x 250 km, i 55°	New configuration of the Safir carrier rocket, featuring a larger second stage with 20% more thrust.
?	Between 18 May and 21 June 2012	?	?	?	Supposed failure		Satellite imagery shows a blast scar on launch pad, suggesting that there has been a launch. No officials have confirmed a launch. It may have been either an engine test or rocket failure at high altitude.
5	2 February 2015	(Iran) Fajr	52 kg	Safir-1B	Success	470 x 224 km, i 55.57°	First Iranian satellite with orbital maneuverability using cold-gas thrusters.
6	5 February 2019	(Iran) Doosti	52 kg	Safir-1B	Failure		The Deputy Minister of Defense in Iran claimed a successful launch. Research associates at the Middlebury Institute of International Studies claimed the launch failed at some point after liftoff.
(7)	29 August 2019	No payload		Safir-1B	Failure		Launch preparation accident.

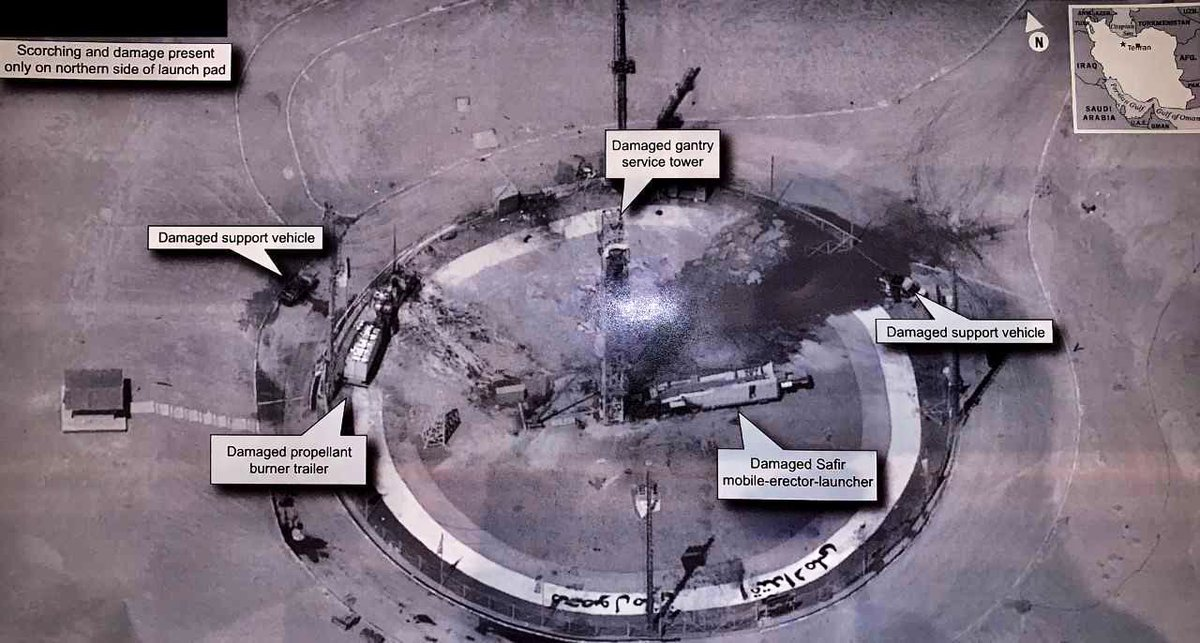
Damaged launch pad at Imam Khomeini Spaceport after rocket explosion of 29 August 2019 during launch preparation

== Gallery ==
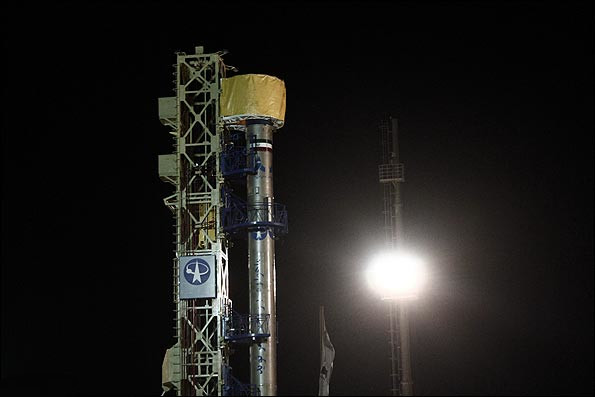
2012 launch of navid satellite

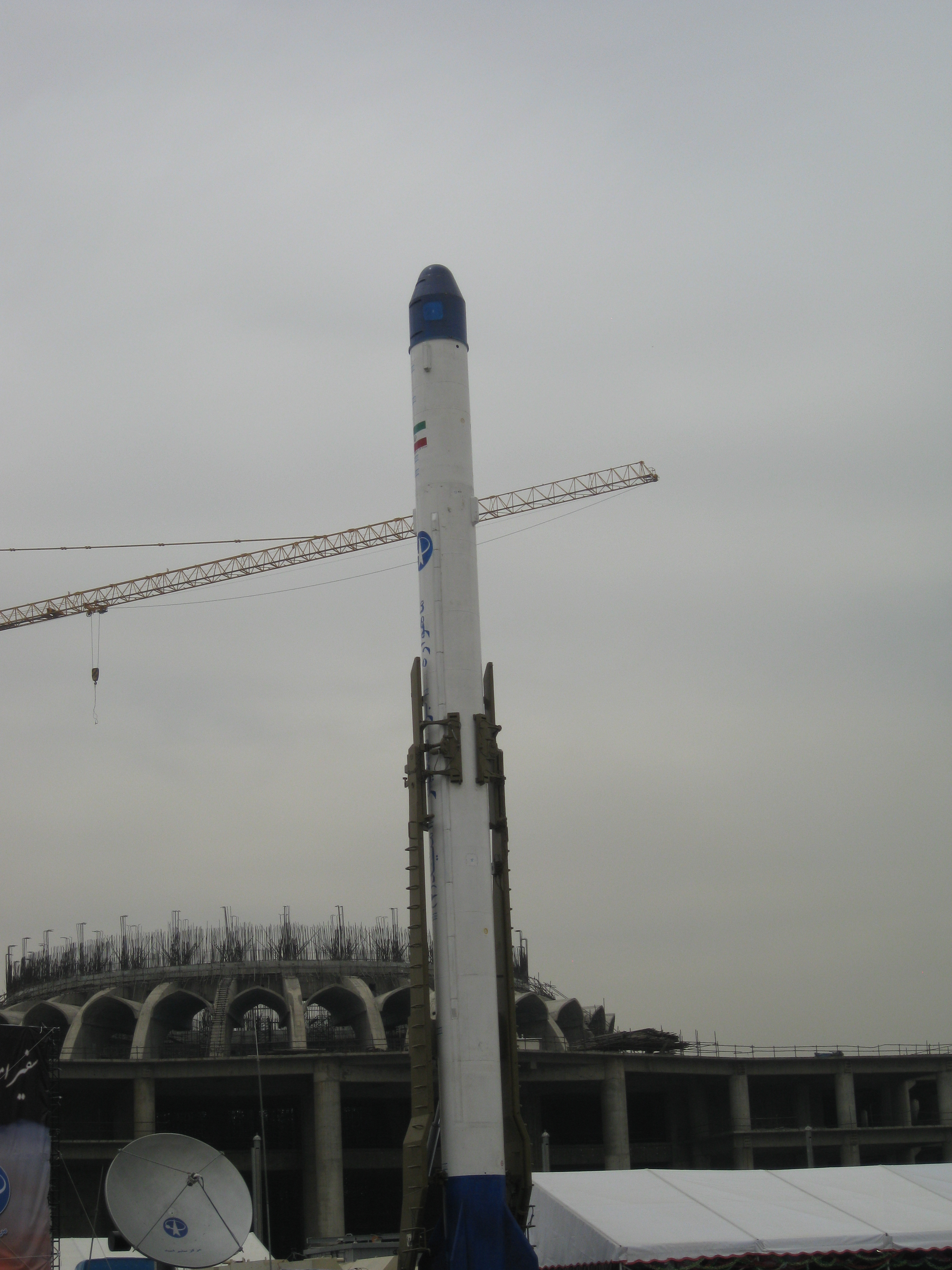
Safir at an exhibition at the Mosalla of Tehran

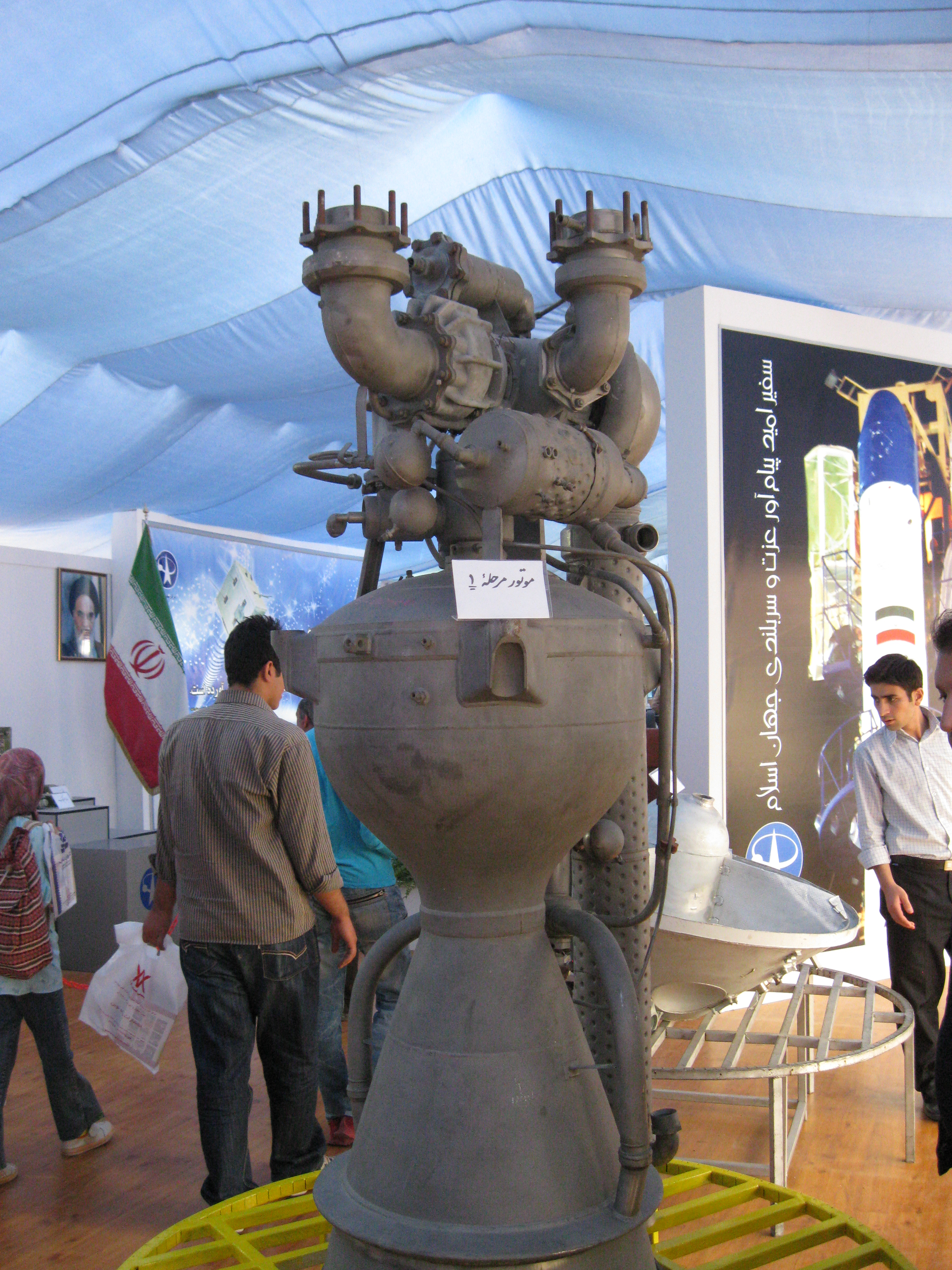
Safir first-stage engine

== See also ==
- International rankings of Iran in Science and Technology
- Iranian Space Agency
- Semnan Space Center

Other Iranian satellite launch vehicles

- Simorgh (rocket)
- Qased (rocket)
- Qaem-100 (rocket)
- Zuljanah (rocket)
