= Simorgh (rocket) =

Iranian expendable launch vehicle

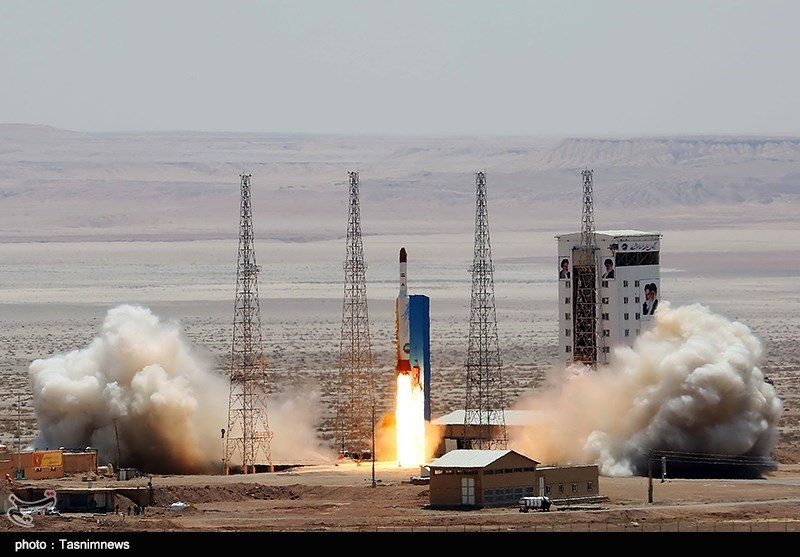
- The Simorgh satellite launch vehicle launching on its first orbital test flight on 27 July 2017.
- Function: Small-lift space launch vehicle
- Country of origin: Iran

Size
- Height: 25.9 m (85 ft)
- Diameter: 2.4 m (7 ft 10 in) first stage, 1.5 m (4 ft 11 in) second stage
- Mass: 87 t (192,000 lb)
- Stages: 2 (optional 3rd stage)

Capacity

Payload to LEO 500 km
- Mass: 250–350 kg (550–770 lb)

Associated rockets
- Family: Derived from Safir

Launch history
- Status: Retired
- Launch sites: Imam Khomeini Space Launch Terminal
- Total launches: 7 or 8 (1 suborbital)
- Success(es): 3 (1 suborbital)
- Failure: 3 or 4
- First flight: 19 April 2016 (suborbital); 27 July 2017 (orbital)
- Last flight: 6 December 2024 (orbital)

First stage
- Height: 17.8 m
- Diameter: 2.4 m
- Powered by: 4 × modified Shahab-3 engines + 4 verniers
- Maximum thrust: 1,590 kN (360,000 lb_{f})
- Burn time: 120 seconds
- Propellant: N_{2}O_{4} / UDMH

Second stage
- Diameter: 1.5 m
- Powered by: 4 × LRE-4 (R-27 Zyb vernier engines)
- Maximum thrust: 71.6 kN (16,100 lb_{f})
- Burn time: 320 seconds
- Propellant: N_{2}O_{4} / UDMH

Third stage (Optional)
- Powered by: Saman-1
- Maximum thrust: 13 kN (2,900 lb_{f})
- Burn time: 40 seconds
- Propellant: Solid

Simorgh (Persian: ماهواره‌بر سیمرغ, Simurgh), also called Safir-2, is an Iranian expendable launch vehicle. It is the successor of the Safir, Iran's first space launch vehicle. Its mission is to carry heavier satellites into higher orbit than Safir.

The project was unveiled by Iranian President Mahmoud Ahmadinejad on 3 February 2010, as part of celebrations of the first anniversary of the launch of Omid, the first indigenously launched Iranian satellite, and was launched for the first time on 19 April 2016.

== Design ==
Simorgh is a two-stage liquid-fueled rocket developed from the Safir rocket. It is able to place a 250 kg (550 lb) to 350 kg (770 lb) payload into a circular 500 km (310 mi) low Earth orbit (LEO). It is also the first Iranian rocket that can place multiple payloads into orbit (e.g., one main payload and several secondary cubesats). In comparison, the Safir was only able to place a 50 kg payload into a 250x375 km elliptic orbit.

The Simorgh rocket is 26.5 metres (87 ft) long, and has a launch mass of 87 tonnes (192,000 lb). Its first stage, with a diameter of 2.4 meters, is powered by a cluster of four synchronized Safir-1B first-stage engines with four separate turbopumps, each of these engines generating up to 37,000 kilograms-force (360 kN; 82,000 lbf) of thrust. The first stage also utilizes a set of four vernier engines sharing a single turbopump used for attitude control and providing an additional 14,000 kgf (140 kN; 31,000 lbf). At liftoff, these engines generate a total 162,000 kgf (1,590 kN; 360,000 lbf) of thrust. The second stage with a diameter of 1.5 meters utilizes a set of four smaller engines similar to the two engines of Safir's second stage. These produce a total 7,000 kgf (69 kN; 15,000 lbf) of thrust.

The Simorgh's total flight time to a 500-530km orbit is between 480 and 495 seconds. The first stage burns for about 102 seconds. Stages separation takes place at an altitude of 90 km and a velocity of 2300 m/s. The fairing shroud is ejected simultaneously with the second stage engine's ignition. The satellite is then accelerated to 7400 m/s and injected into its designated orbit.

In contrast to its predecessor Safir, the Simorgh is integrated and assembled vertically on a launch pad located at the Imam Khomeini Space Center. Each stage goes through manufacturing horizontally and is subsequently brought to the launch pad, where final assembly of the stages is completed with the aid of a custom-designed service tower.

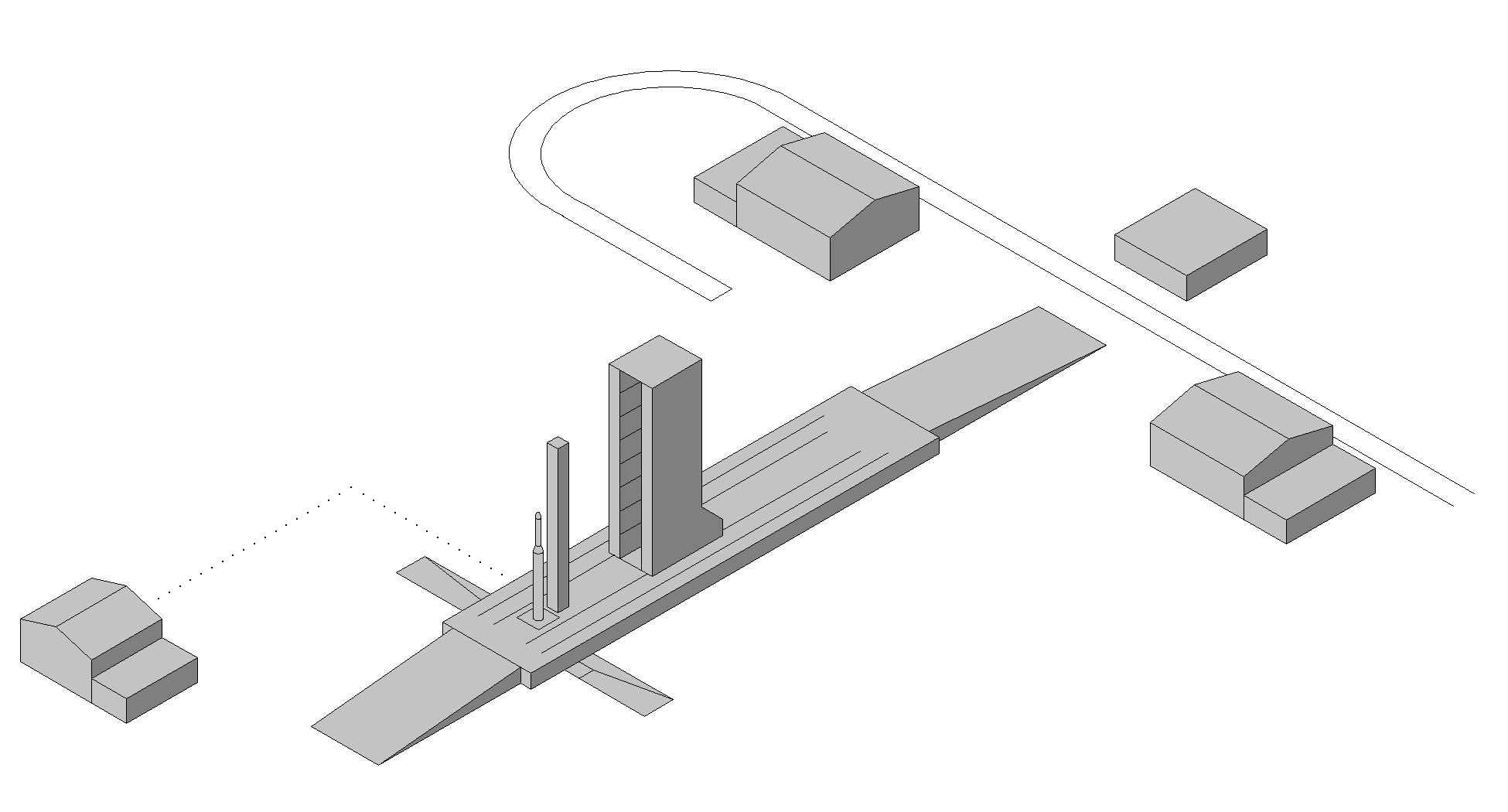
The Simorgh launch pad at the Imam Khomeini Space Center.

Saman-1 is a solid-fueled orbital transfer system under development that produces 1,300 kgf (13 kN; 2,900 lbf) of thrust and will be used as an additional upper stage in future.

== Reliability ==
The development of the Simorgh has been marked with difficulties and unreliability of certain sub-systems due to the overcomplexity of its engines and turbopumps. Out of the system's first four launches (two orbital and two sub-orbital launches) there have been three failures, giving the rocket a reliability rating of twenty five percent. There were however, indications of progressive improvements to the design and reliability of the system with each successive launch; with the 2017 launch operating for 120 seconds before failure, the 2019 launch operating 450 seconds before failure, and the 2020 launch operating correctly for 475 seconds out of the 490 seconds of operation required for a successful mission, giving the missions a 25, 92, 97, percent success rate respectively, indicating a trend of increasing reliability in the design.

== Launch history ==
Satellite(s)	Date & Time (UTC)	Launch site	Satellite Mass	Outcome	Remarks
No payload	19 April 2016	Semnan LP-2	N/A	Success	Sub-orbital test flight.
No payload	27 July 2017	Semnan LP-2	100 kg	Failure	Orbital test flight. Simorgh operated for 136 seconds. Second stage failed.
Payam (named "AUT-SAT" previously)	15 January 2019	Semnan LP-2	90 kg	Failure	Orbital test flight. Simorgh operated for 455 seconds. Third stage failed.
Zafar-1	9 February 2020, 15:45	Semnan LP-2	113 kg	Failure	Orbital test flight. Simorgh operated for 475 seconds. Satellite reached speed of 6,500 m/s out of the 7,400 m/s required to orbit. First stage operated fully correctly. Second stage failed.
Unknown	12 June 2021	Semnan LP-2		Disputed launch existence	U.S. official stated "is aware of an Iranian rocket launch failure". Satellite imagery "looked like a launch" occurred. Iran's Telecommunications Minister denied any launch.
Three research devices	30 December 2021	Semnan LP-2	TBA	Failure	Orbital test flight.First time Iran launched multiple payloads in the same launch. Simorgh operated for about 600 seconds (500 seconds for the second stage). Devices didn't enter orbit; reached an altitude of 470 km and a speed of 7,350 m/s, out of the 7,600 m/s required.
Mahda, Keyhan-2 and Hatef-1	28 January 2024	Semnan LP-2	TBA	Success	First successful orbital launch of Simorgh, placed three satellites into a 1100 x 450 km orbit. The launch occurred just 8 days after the first successful orbital launch of Qaem 100.
Saman-1, Fakhr-1 and one other research satellite	6 December 2024	Semnan LP-2	300 kg	Success	The launch of the Saman-1 orbital transfer block to an altitude of 400 kilometers, along with two other payloads (including the Fakhr-1 satellite), with a total weight of 300 kilograms, breaking weight record.
Navak-1	18 February 2025	Semnan LP-2	40 kg	Failure	Reports initially stated that Iran planned to launch the 40 kg "Navak" satellite into GTO orbit (200 to 31,000 km altitude) on February 18, 2024. However, updates on the mission stopped, suggesting the launch may have failed — though officials likely withheld the news to avoid harming the country’s image.

== Gallery ==
Simorgh during the launch of Payam satellite on 15 January 2021

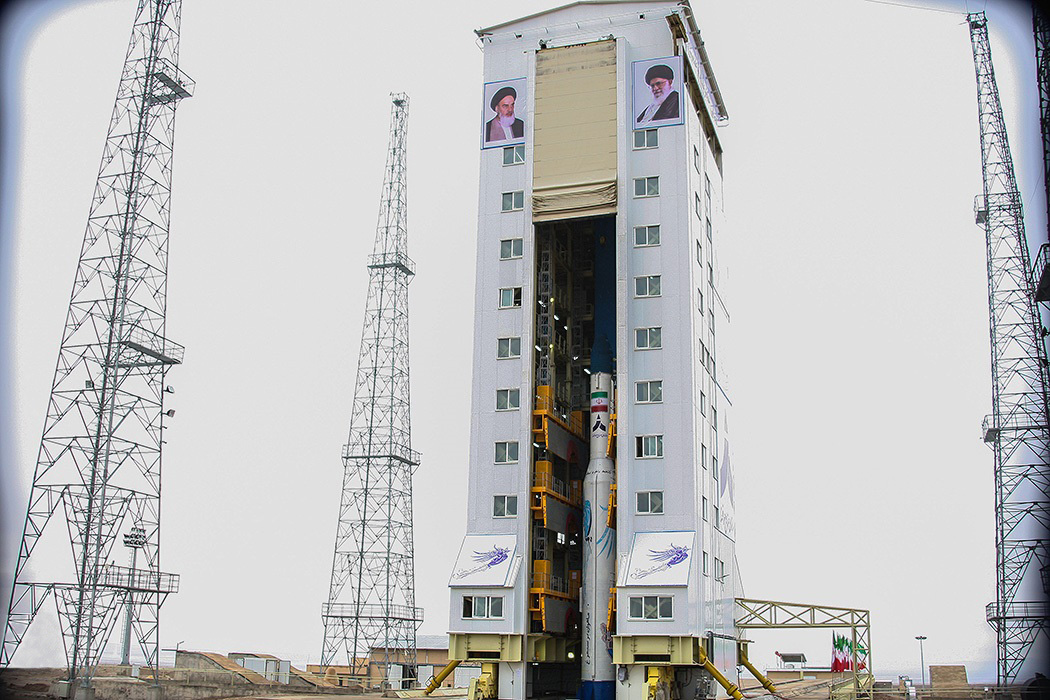
Simorgh during launch preparations

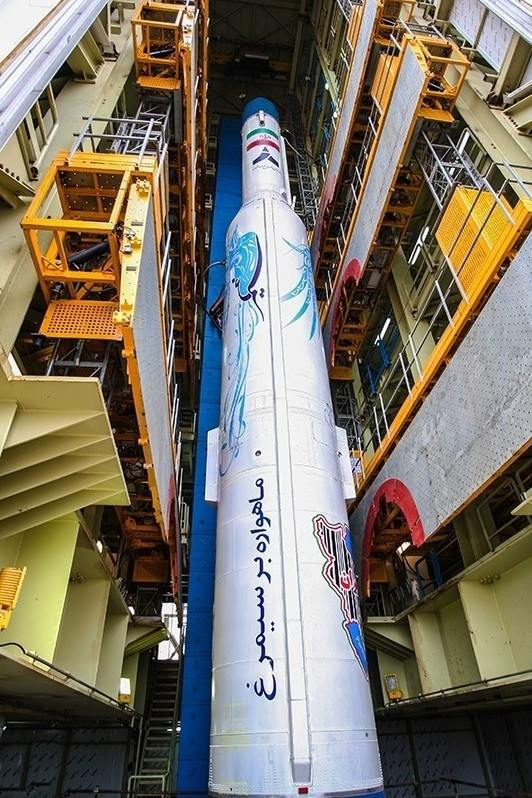
Simorgh in its servicing tower

== See also ==
- Comparison of orbital launchers families
- Comparison of orbital launch systems
- Iranian Space Agency
- Saman-1 (rocket stage)

Other Iranian satellite launch vehicles

- Safir (rocket)
- Qased (rocket)
- Qaem-100 (rocket)
- Zuljanah (rocket)
