= Human spaceflight programs =

Human spaceflight programs are organized efforts for human spaceflight. Programs have been planned, pursued and realized by different countries and companies.

Until the 21st century, human spaceflight programs were sponsored exclusively by governments, through either the military or civilian space agencies. With the launch of the privately funded SpaceShipOne in 2004, a new category of human spaceflight programs – commercial human spaceflight – arrived. By the end of 2022, three countries (Soviet Union/Russia, United States and China) and one private company (SpaceX) had successfully launched humans to Earth orbit, and two private companies (Scaled Composites and Blue Origin) had launched humans on a suborbital trajectory.

The criteria for what constitutes human spaceflight vary. The Fédération Aéronautique Internationale defines spaceflight as any flight over 100 kilometers (62 mi). In the United States professional, military, and commercial astronauts who travel above an altitude of 80 kilometers (50 mi) are awarded the United States Astronaut Badge. This article follows the FAI definition of spaceflight.

== Successful programs ==
Programs in this section are sorted by the years when the first successful crewed spaceflight took place.

=== Vostok program (USSR, 1956–1964) ===
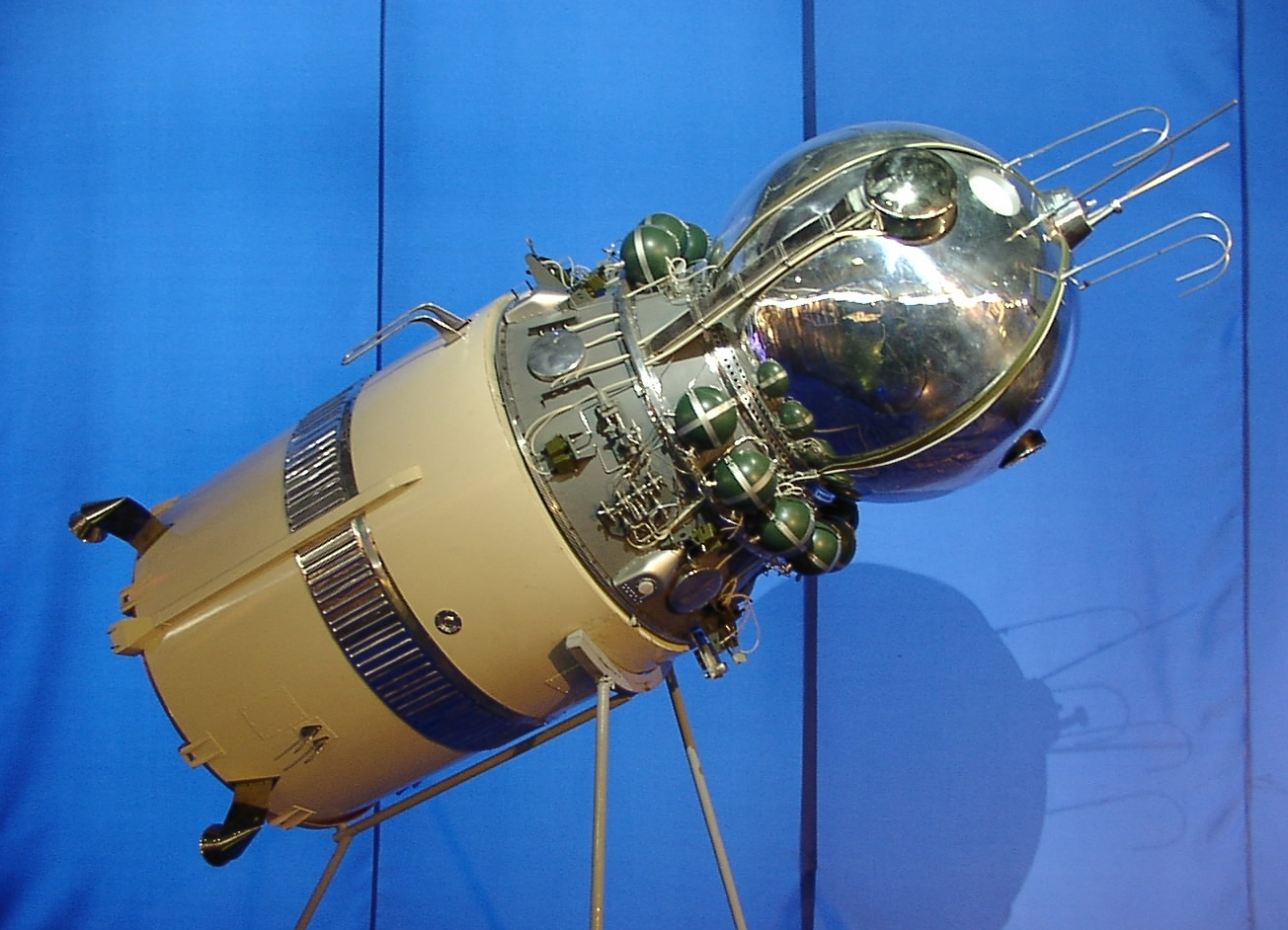
Model of Vostok spacecraft with third stage of launcher

The Vostok program was a project that succeeded in putting a person into orbit for the first time. Sergei Korolev and Konstantin Feoktistov began, in June 1956, crewed spacecraft research. The program developed the Vostok spacecraft from the Zenit spy satellite project and adapted the Vostok rocket from an existing ICBM design. Just before the first release of the name Vostok to the press, it was a classified word. By August/September 1958 a division had been formed devoted to producing the first Vostok craft. The official approval (decree) for the Vostok was delayed until 22 May 1959 by competition with photo reconnaissance programs.

Vostok 1 was the first human spaceflight. The Vostok 3KA spacecraft was launched on April 12, 1961, taking into space Yuri Gagarin, a cosmonaut from the Soviet Union. The Vostok 1 mission was the first time anyone had journeyed into outer space and the first time anyone had entered into orbit.

There were six Vostok flights in total, including the June, 1963 Vostok 6 mission flown by Valentina Tereshkova, the first woman in space. Another seven Vostok flights (Vostok 7 to 13) were originally planned, going through to April 1966, but these were canceled and the components recycled into the Voskhod program, which was intended to achieve more Soviet firsts in space.

=== Project Mercury (USA, 1959–1963) ===
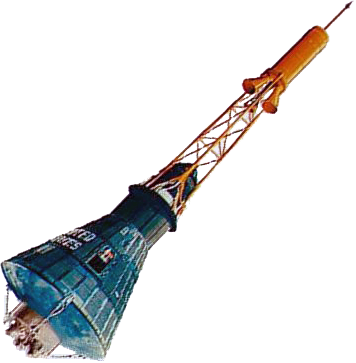
Mercury capsule with escape tower

Project Mercury was the first human spaceflight program of the United States. It ran from 1959 through 1963 with the goal of putting a human in orbit around the Earth. John Glenn's Mercury-Atlas 6 flight on 20 February 1962 was the first Mercury flight to achieve this goal. Prior to that, the Mercury-Redstone 3 mission brought the first American into space, Alan Shepard. It featured the first manual pilot control of the spacecraft and the landing with pilot still within it.

Early planning and research was carried out by the National Advisory Committee for Aeronautics, and the program was officially conducted by the newly created NASA.

Because of their small size it was said that the Mercury spacecraft capsules were worn, not ridden. With 1.7 cubic metres (60 cu ft) of habitable volume, the capsule was just large enough for the single crew member. Inside were 120 controls: 55 electrical switches, 30 fuses and 35 mechanical levers. The spacecraft was designed by Max Faget and NASA's Space Task Group.

NASA ordered 20 production spacecraft, numbered 1 through 20, from McDonnell Aircraft Company, St. Louis, Missouri. Five of the twenty spacecraft, #10, 12, 15, 17, and 19, were not flown. Spacecraft #3 and #4 were destroyed during uncrewed test flights. Spacecraft #11 sank and was recovered from the bottom of the Atlantic Ocean after 38 years. Some spacecraft were modified after initial production (refurbished after launch abort, modified for longer missions, etc.) and received a letter designation after their number, examples 2A, 15B. Some spacecraft were modified twice; for example, spacecraft 15 became 15A and then 15B.

=== North American X-15 (USA, 1954–1968) ===
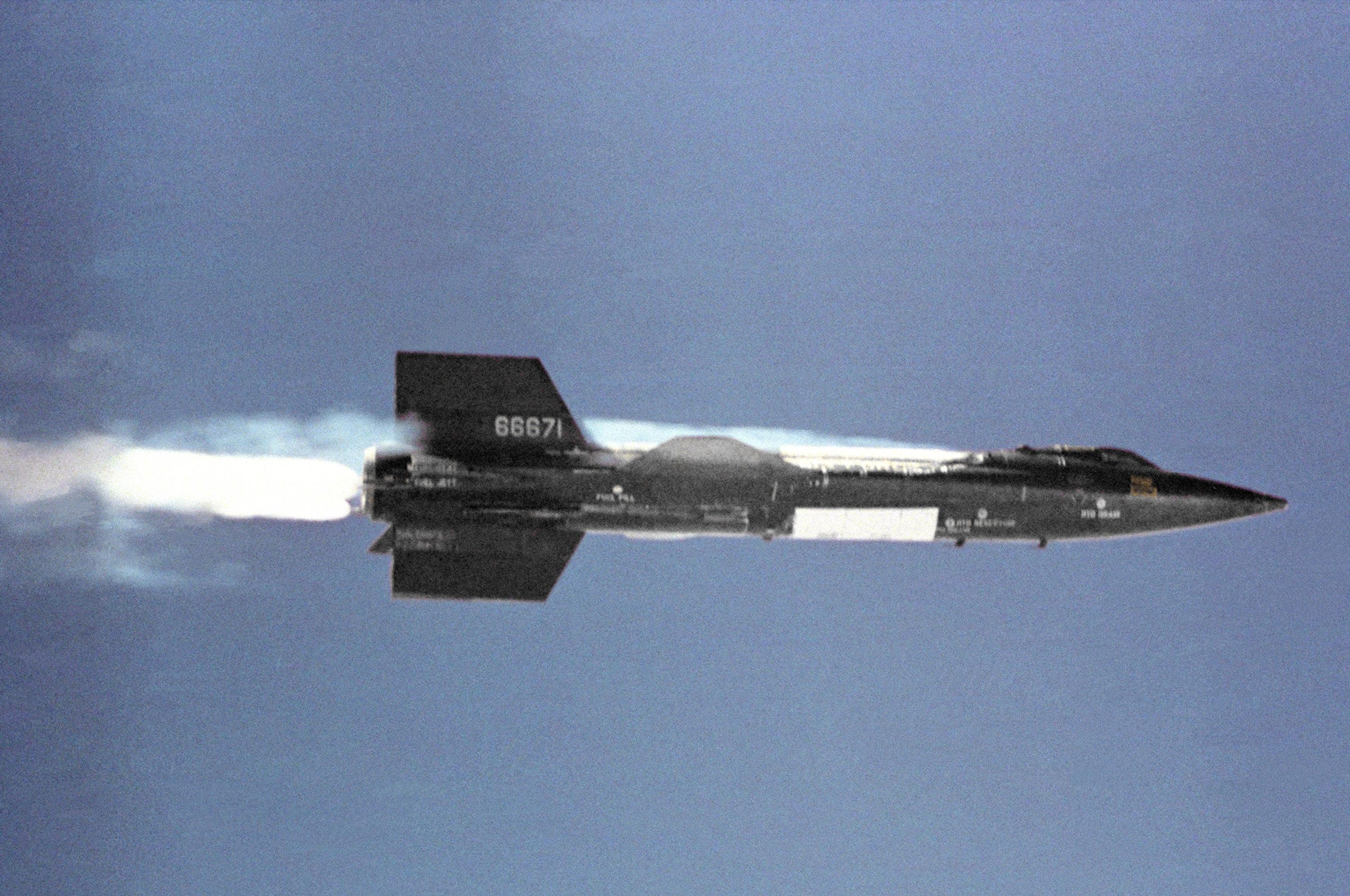
X-15 in flight

The North American X-15 rocket-powered aircraft was part of the X-series of experimental aircraft, initiated with the Bell X-1, that were made for the USAF, NASA, and the USN. The X-15 set speed and altitude records in the early 1960s, reaching the edge of outer space and returning with valuable data used in aircraft and spacecraft design. It currently holds the world record for the fastest speed ever reached by a crewed aircraft.

During the X-15 program, 13 of the flights (by eight pilots) met the USAF spaceflight criteria by exceeding the altitude of 50 miles (80 km), thus qualifying the pilots for astronaut status; some pilots also qualified for NASA astronaut wings.

=== Voskhod program (USSR, 1964–1965) ===
The Voskhod program (Russian: Восход, "ascent", "dawn") was a Soviet human spaceflight project. Voskhod development was a follow-on to the Vostok program, recycling components left over from that program's cancellation following its first six flights. The two missions flown used the Voskhod spacecraft and rocket.

The Voskhod spacecraft was basically a Vostok spacecraft that had a backup, solid fuel retrorocket added to the top of the descent module. The heavier weight of the craft was made possible by improvements to the R-7 Semyorka-derived booster. The ejection seat was removed and two or three crew couches were added to the interior at a 90-degree angle to that of the Vostok crew position. However, the position of the in-flight controls was not changed, so the crew had to crane their heads 90 degrees to see the instruments.

While the Vostok program was dedicated towards understanding the effects of space travel and microgravity on the human body, Voskhod's two flights were aimed towards spectacular "firsts". Cosmonaut Alexei Leonov made the first EVA ("spacewalk") during Voskhod 2, which became the main success of the program, while putting the first multi-person crew into orbit during Voskhod 1 was the objective that initially motivated it. Once both goals were realized, the program was abandoned. This followed the change in Soviet leadership, which was less concerned about stunt and prestige flights, and allowed the Soviet designers to concentrate on the Soyuz program.

=== Project Gemini (USA, 1965–1966) ===
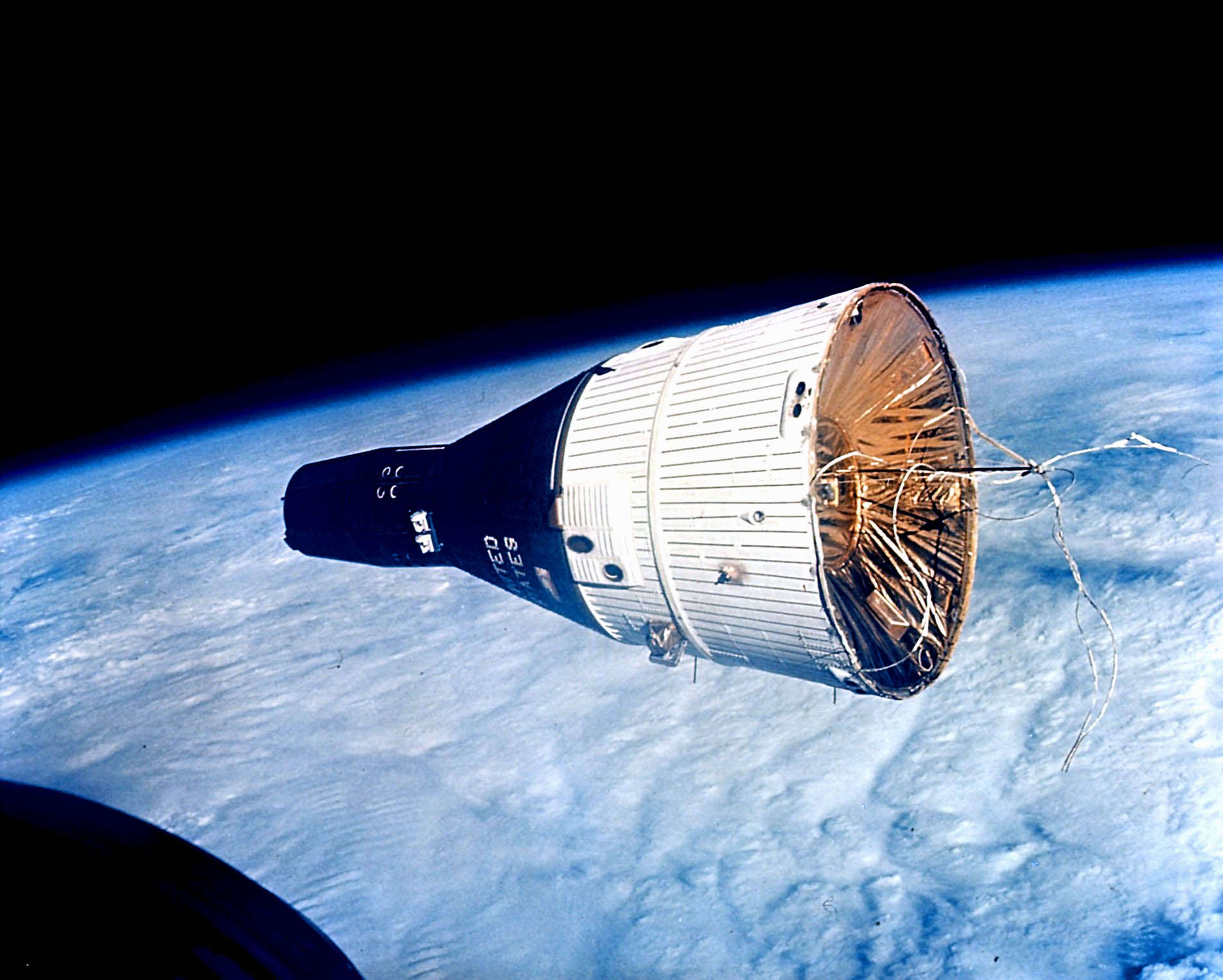
Gemini spacecraft on orbit

Project Gemini was the second human spaceflight program conducted by NASA. It operated between Projects Mercury and Apollo, with 10 crewed flights occurring in 1965 and 1966. Its objective was to develop techniques for advanced space travel, notably those necessary for Project Apollo, whose objective was to land humans on the Moon. Gemini missions included the first American extravehicular activity, and new orbital maneuvers including rendezvous and docking.

Gemini was originally seen as a simple extrapolation of the Mercury program, and thus early on was called Mercury Mark II. The actual program had little in common with Mercury and was superior to even Apollo in some ways. This was mainly a result of its late start date, which allowed it to benefit from much that had been learned during the early stages of the Apollo project (which, despite its later launch dates, actually began before Gemini).

=== Soyuz program (USSR/Russia, 1967–ongoing) ===
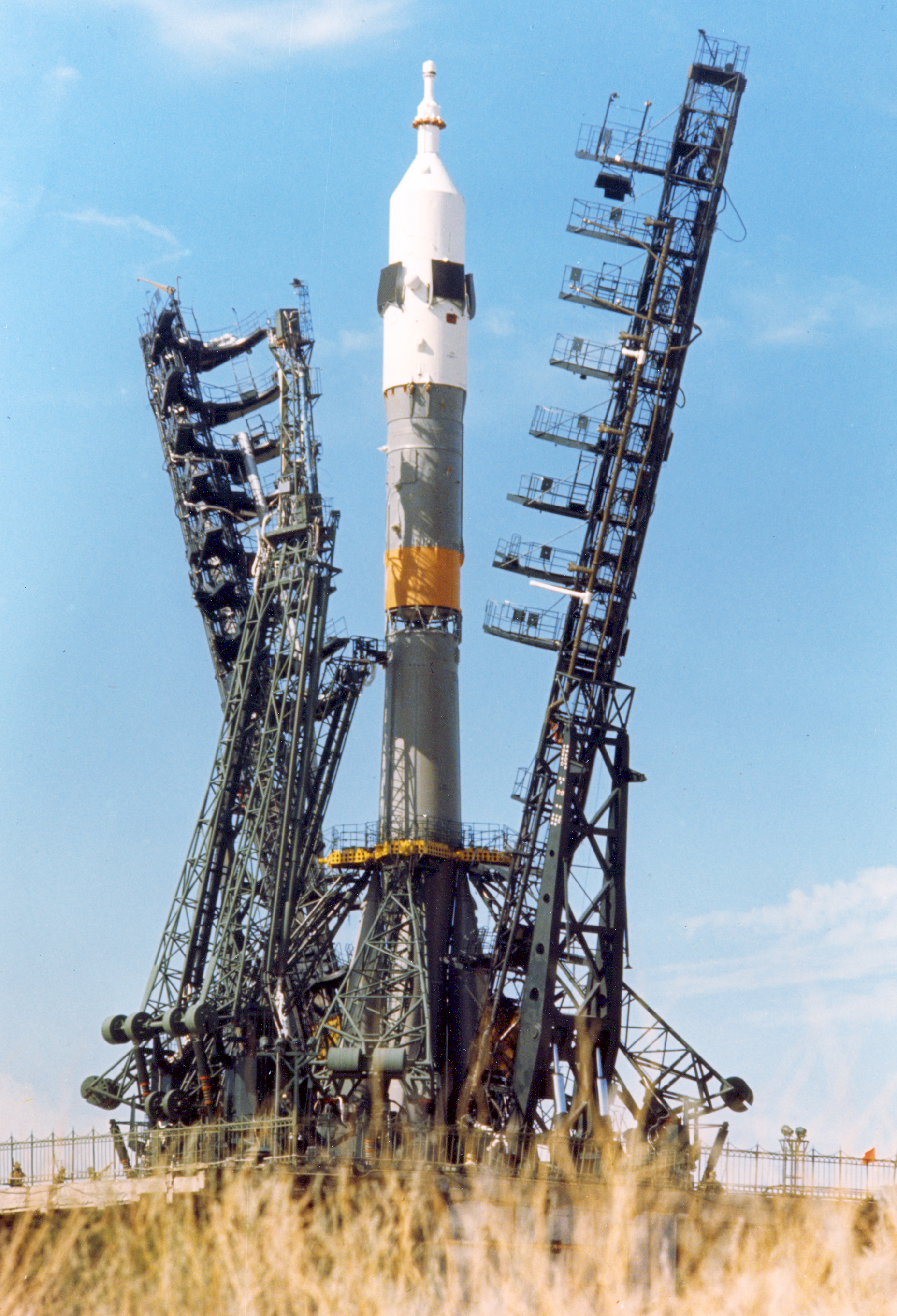
Soyuz rocket on launch pad.

The Soyuz program (Russian: Союз, pronounced [sɐˈjus], meaning "Union") is a human spaceflight program that was initiated by the Soviet Union in early 1967. It was originally part of a Moon landing program intended to put a Soviet cosmonaut on the Moon. All experimental or unsuccessful starts received the status of satellites of a series Kosmos, and flights of the Lunar orbital ships around the Moon – the name Zond. Both the Soyuz spacecraft and the Soyuz rocket are part of this program, which is now the responsibility of the Russian Federal Space Agency.

The basic Soyuz spacecraft design was the basis for many projects, many of which never came to light. Its earliest form was intended to travel to the Moon without employing a huge booster like the Saturn V or the Soviet N-1 by repeatedly docking with upper stages that had been put in orbit using the same rocket as the Soyuz. This and the initial civilian designs were done under the Soviet Chief Designer Sergei Pavlovich Korolev, who did not live to see the craft take flight. Several military derivatives actually took precedence in the Soviet design process, though they never came to pass.

The launch vehicles used in the Soyuz expendable launch system are manufactured at the Progress State Research and Production Rocket Space Center (TsSKB-Progress) in Samara, Russia. As well as being used in the Soyuz program as the launcher for the crewed Soyuz spacecraft, Soyuz launch vehicles are now also used to launch robotic Progress supply spacecraft to the International Space Station and commercial launches marketed and operated by TsSKB-Progress and the Starsem company. There were 11 Soyuz launches in 2001 and 9 in 2002. Currently, Soyuz vehicles are launched from the Baikonur Cosmodrome in Kazakhstan and the Plesetsk Cosmodrome in northwest Russia. Since 2009 Soyuz launch vehicles are also being launched from the Guiana Space Centre in French Guiana.

=== Apollo Program (USA, 1961–1975) ===
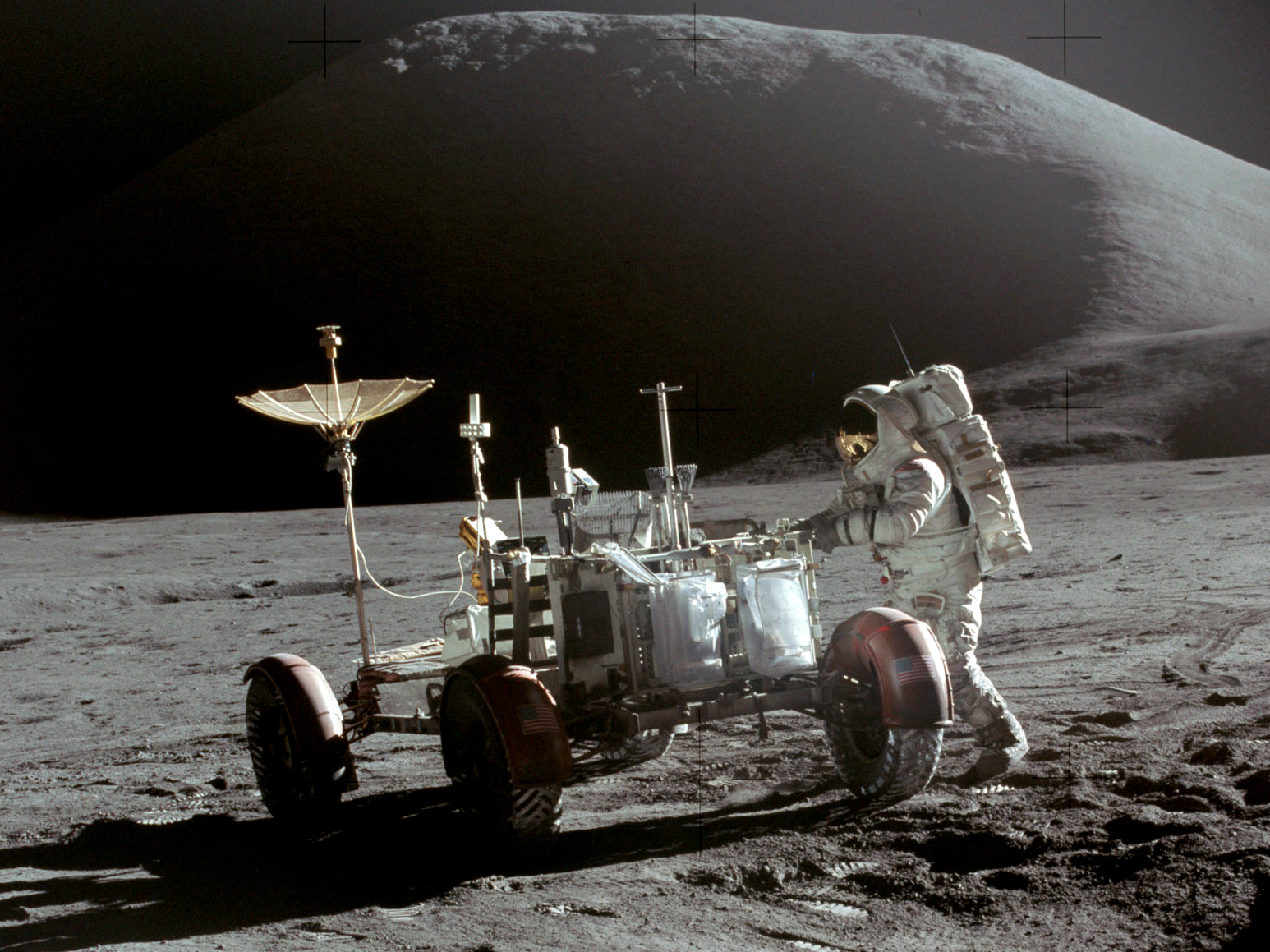
Lunar Roving Vehicle used on Apollos 15–17

The Apollo Program was undertaken by NASA during the years 1961–1975 with the goal of conducting crewed Moon landing missions. In 1961, President John F. Kennedy announced a goal of landing a man on the Moon by the end of the decade. It was accomplished on July 20, 1969, by the landing of astronauts Neil Armstrong and Buzz Aldrin, with Michael Collins orbiting above during the Apollo 11 mission. Five other Apollo missions also landed astronauts on the Moon, the last one in 1972. These six Apollo spaceflights are the only times humans have landed on another celestial body.

Apollo was the third human spaceflight program undertaken by NASA, the space agency of the United States. It used Apollo spacecraft and Saturn launch vehicles, which were later used for the Skylab program and the joint American-Soviet Apollo–Soyuz Test Project. These later programs are thus often considered to be part of the overall Apollo program.

The goal of the program, as articulated by President Kennedy, was accomplished with only two major failures. The first failure resulted in the deaths of three astronauts, Gus Grissom, Ed White and Roger Chaffee, in the Apollo 1 launchpad fire. The second was an in-space explosion on Apollo 13, which badly damaged the spacecraft on the moonward leg of its journey. The three astronauts aboard narrowly escaped with their lives, thanks to the efforts of flight controllers, project engineers, backup crew members and the skills of the astronauts themselves.

=== Space Shuttle (USA, 1972–2011) ===
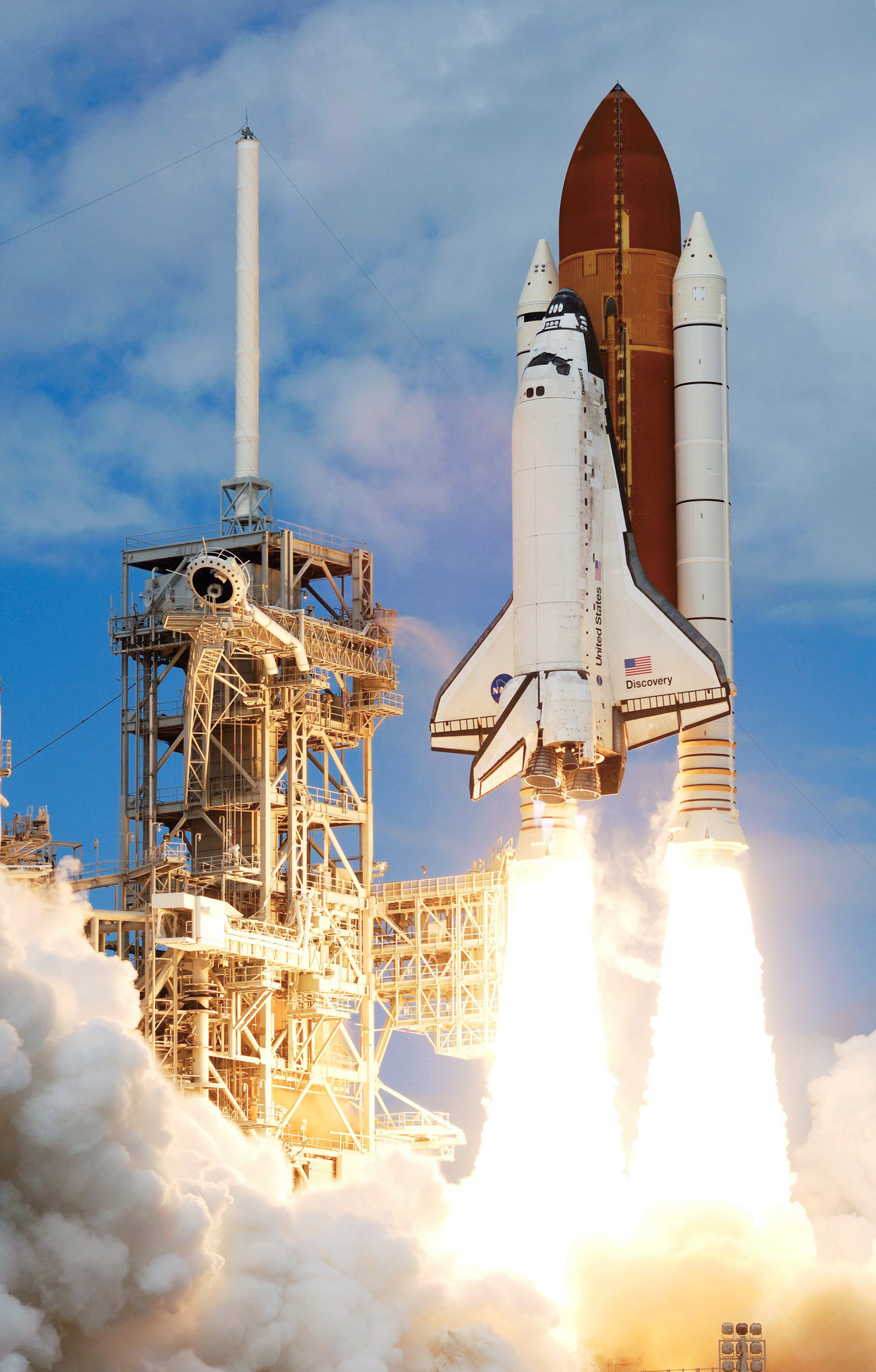
Space Shuttle Discovery launches at the start of STS-120

NASA's Space Shuttle, officially called "Space Transportation System" (STS), was a United States government crewed launch vehicle, retired from service in 2011. The winged Space Shuttle orbiter was launched vertically, usually carrying five to seven astronauts (although eight have been carried) and up to 50,000 lb (23,000 kg) of payload into low Earth orbit. When its mission was complete, the shuttle could independently move itself out of orbit (by means of making a 180-degree turn and firing its main engines, thus slowing it down) and re-enter the Earth's atmosphere. During descent and landing, the orbiter acted as a glider and made a completely unpowered runway landing.

The Space Shuttle was the only winged spacecraft to achieve orbit and land with crew aboard, and the first of a small number of reusable space vehicles to make multiple flights into orbit (subsequently followed by the X-37B, Cargo Dragon, and Crew Dragon). Its missions involved carrying large payloads to various low-Earth orbits (including segments to be added to the International Space Station), providing crew rotation for the International Space Station, and performing service missions to the Hubble Space Telescope. The orbiter could also recover satellites and other payloads from orbit and return them to Earth, but its use in this capacity was rare. However, the Space Shuttle was used to return large payloads from the ISS to Earth, as the Russian Soyuz spacecraft has limited capacity for return payloads. Each vehicle was designed with a projected lifespan of 100 launches, or 10 years' operational life.

=== China Manned Space Program (China, 1992–ongoing) ===
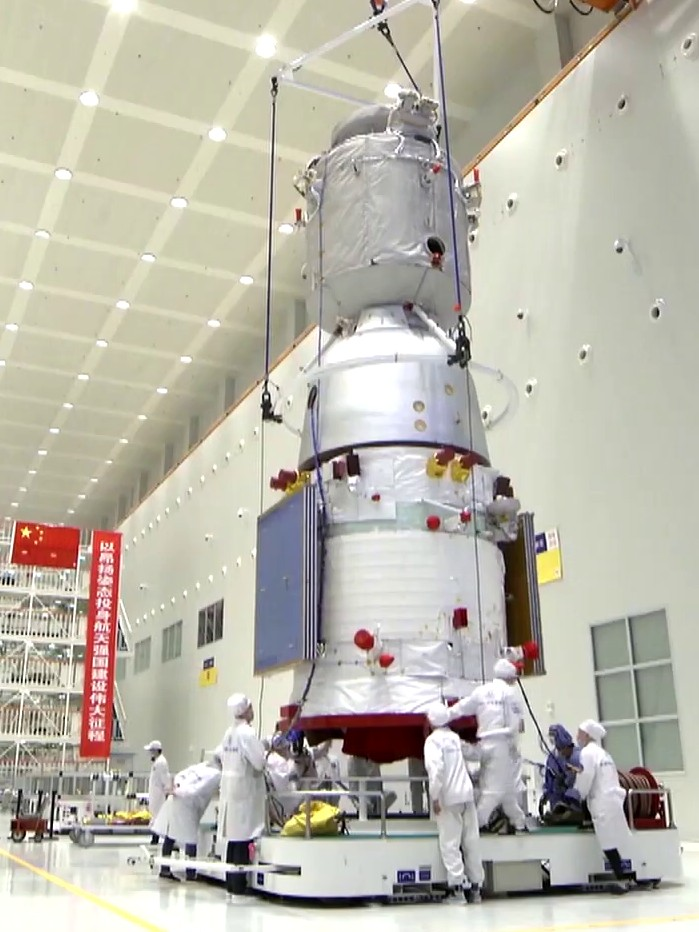
Shenzhou spacecraft of China

China was the first Asian country and third nation in the world, after the USSR and USA, to send humans into space. During the Space Race between the two superpowers, which culminated with Apollo 11 landing humans on the Moon, Mao Zedong and Zhou Enlai decided on 14 July 1967 that China should not be left behind, and initiated their own crewed space program: the top-secret Project 714, which aimed to put two people into space by 1973 with the Shuguang spacecraft. Nineteen PLAAF pilots were selected for this goal in March 1971. The Shuguang-1 spacecraft, to be launched with the CZ-2A rocket, was designed to carry a crew of two. The program was officially cancelled on 13 May 1972 for economic reasons.

A second, short-lived crewed program was based on the successful implementation of landing technology by FSW satellites. It was announced a few times in 1978 with the publishing of some details, including photos, but then was abruptly canceled in 1980. It has been argued that the second crewed program was created solely for propaganda purposes, and was never intended to produce results.

In 1992, under China Manned Space Program (CMS), also known as "Project 921", authorization and funding was given for the first phase of a third, successful attempt at crewed spaceflight. To achieve independent human spaceflight capability, China developed Shenzhou spacecraft and Long March 2F rocket dedicated for human spaceflight in the next few years, along with critical infrastructures like new launch site and flight control center being built. The first uncrewed spacecraft, Shenzhou 1, was launched on 20 November 1999 and recovered the next day, marking the first step of the realization of China's human spaceflight capability. Three more uncrewed missions were conducted in the next few years in order to verify the key technologies. On 15 October 2003 Shenzhou 5, China's first crewed spaceflight mission, put Yang Liwei in orbit for 21 hours and returned safely back to Inner Mongolia, making China the third nation to launch a human into orbit independently.

=== SpaceShipOne / SpaceShipTwo (USA, 2004–ongoing) ===

Virgin Galactic is a company within Sir Richard Branson's Virgin Group, which is developing a privately funded spacecraft called SpaceShipOne and SpaceShipTwo, in conjunction with Scaled Composites to offer sub-orbital spaceflights and later orbital spaceflights to the paying public. SpaceShipOne reached space with a pilot in three test flights in 2004.

Tier One is Scaled Composites' program of suborbital human spaceflight using the reusable spacecraft SpaceShipOne and its launcher White Knight. The craft are designed by Burt Rutan, and the project is funded 20 million US Dollars by Paul Allen. In 2004 it made the first privately funded human spaceflight and won the 10 million US Dollars Ansari X Prize for the first non-governmental reusable crewed spacecraft.

The objective of the project is to develop technology for low-cost routine access to space. Tier One is not itself intended to carry paying passengers, but it is envisioned that there will be commercial spinoffs, initially in space tourism. The company Mojave Aerospace Ventures was formed to manage commercial exploitation of the technology. A deal with Virgin Galactic could see routine space tourism, using a spacecraft based on Tier One technology.

The model finally developed into SpaceShipTwo, Virgin Galactic's second generation suborbital vehicle. On 10 October 2010, VSS Enterprise, the first SpaceShipTwo spaceplane, made its first crewed gliding test flight. By October 2014 SpaceShipTwo had conducted 54 test flights. On October 31, 2014, SpaceShipTwo VSS Enterprise suffered an in-flight breakup during a powered flight test, resulting in a crash killing one pilot and injuring the other. The second SpaceShipTwo, VSS Unity, made first flight tests in 2016. VSS Unity made its first spaceflight (according to the U.S. definition of space) on December 13, 2018. Marking the end of the "shuttle gap." VSS Unity made its second spaceflight on February 22, 2019.

=== Commercial Crew Program (USA, 2011–ongoing) ===
The Commercial Crew Program is an economic stimulus program funds technology development related to human spaceflight by private companies. In September 2014 NASA awarded contracts to SpaceX and Boeing to build crewed spacecraft for low Earth orbit operations. Dragon 2, the capsule developed by SpaceX, is listed under "successful programs" as it first launched humans to space in May 2020.

==== Dragon 2 (USA, 2010–ongoing) ====
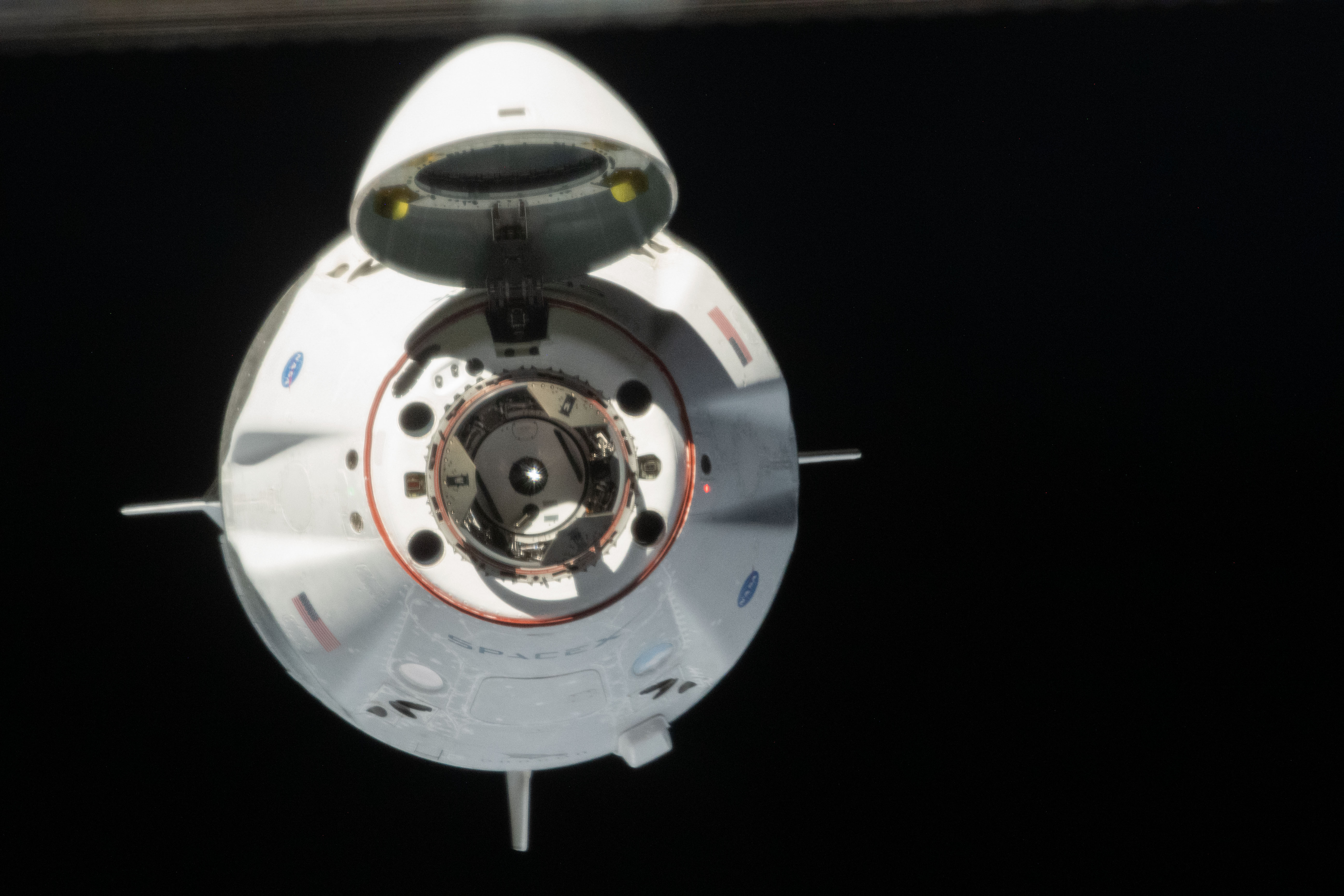
Dragon 2 on its first crewed flight, approaching the ISS

The SpaceX Dragon 2 is a development of the robotic Dragon cargo spacecraft which has been re-supplying the International Space Station since 2010. The spacecraft is able to carry a crew of four astronauts to the International Space Station, with a planned maximum capacity of seven. It includes a set of four side-mounted thruster pods with two SuperDraco engines each as Launch Abort System (LAS).

To develop Dragon 2, SpaceX did a "pad abort" test in May 2015. A one-week uncrewed orbital flight to the ISS occurred in March 2019, an in-flight abort test was successfully conducted on 19 January 2020. A crewed demonstration mission to the ISS launched on 30 May 2020. The first operational crewed mission, Crew-1, flew to the ISS in November 2020 for a six-month stay. Dragon 2 has flown Inspiration4, the first purely private mission to Earth orbit.

==== Starliner (USA, 2010–ongoing) ====
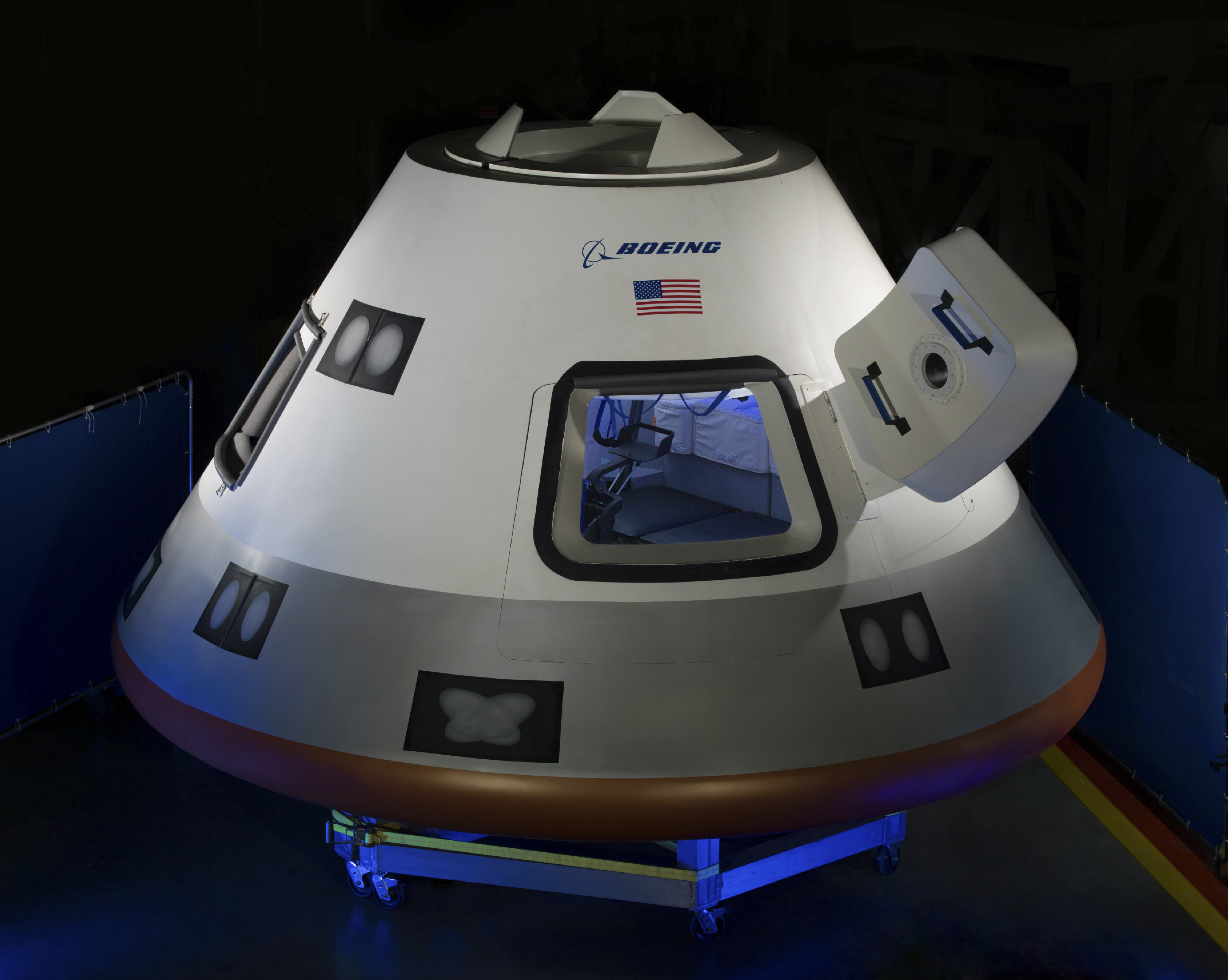
Starliner mock up

The Boeing Starliner is a class of space capsules under construction by Boeing to transport crew to the International Space Station, and to private space stations such as the proposed Bigelow Aerospace Commercial Space Station. The Starliner is to support larger crews of up to seven people. The Starliner is designed to be able to remain on-orbit for up to seven months and for reusability for up to ten missions.

Starliner made an uncrewed test flight in December 2019 but failed to reach the ISS. Another uncrewed flight was launched in May 2022, followed by final certification crewed demonstration flight to get Starliner operational in June 2024.

=== New Shepard (USA, 2006–ongoing) ===
The New Shepard is a reusable launch system capable of vertical-takeoff, vertical-landing (VTVL), suborbital crewed spacecraft by Blue Origin, a company owned by Amazon.com founder and businessman Jeff Bezos, flying humans to space since 2021. It is a commercial system for suborbital space tourism. The name New Shepard makes reference to the first United States astronaut in space, Alan Shepard.

The first flight of the New Shepard vehicle was conducted on 29 April 2015 during which an altitude of 93,500 meters (307,000 ft) was attained. While the test itself was deemed a success and the capsule was correctly recovered via parachute landing, the booster stage landing failed because hydraulic pressure was lost during the descent. Twelve subsequent flights (through January 2019), including two in-flight abort tests, took place with safe landings of both capsule and booster with two additional vehicles. New Shepard first flew humans to space on 20 July 2021 with the NS-16 mission.

== Successful space station programs ==
(Dates refer to periods when stations were inhabited by crews.)

=== Salyut stations (USSR, 1971–1986) ===
The Salyut program was the world's first space station program undertaken by the Soviet Union, which consisted of a series of four crewed scientific research space stations and two crewed military reconnaissance space stations over a period of 15 years from 1971 to 1986. Two other Salyut launches failed. Salyut was, on the one hand, designed to carry out long-term research into the problems of living in space and a variety of astronomical, biological and Earth-resources experiments, and on the other hand this civilian program was used as a cover for the highly secretive military Almaz stations, which flew under the Salyut designation. Salyut 1, the first station in the program, became the world's first crewed space station. Salyut broke several spaceflight records, including several mission duration records, the first ever orbital handover of a space station from one crew to another, and various spacewalk records. The program went through various changes.

- Salyut 1/DOS-1 (1971, 1 crew and 1 failed docking)
- Salyut 2/Almaz/OPS-1 (1973, failed shortly after launch)
- Salyut 3/Almaz/OPS-2 (1974, 1 crew and 1 failed docking)
- Salyut 4/DOS-4 (1975–1976, 2 crews)
- Salyut 5/Almaz/OPS-3 (1976–1977, 2 crews and 1 failed docking)
- Salyut 6/DOS-5 (1977–1981, 16 crews (5 long duration, 11 short duration) and 1 failed docking)
- Salyut 7/DOS-6 (1982–1986, 10 crews (6 long duration, 4 short duration) and 1 failed docking)

=== Skylab (USA, 1973–1974) ===
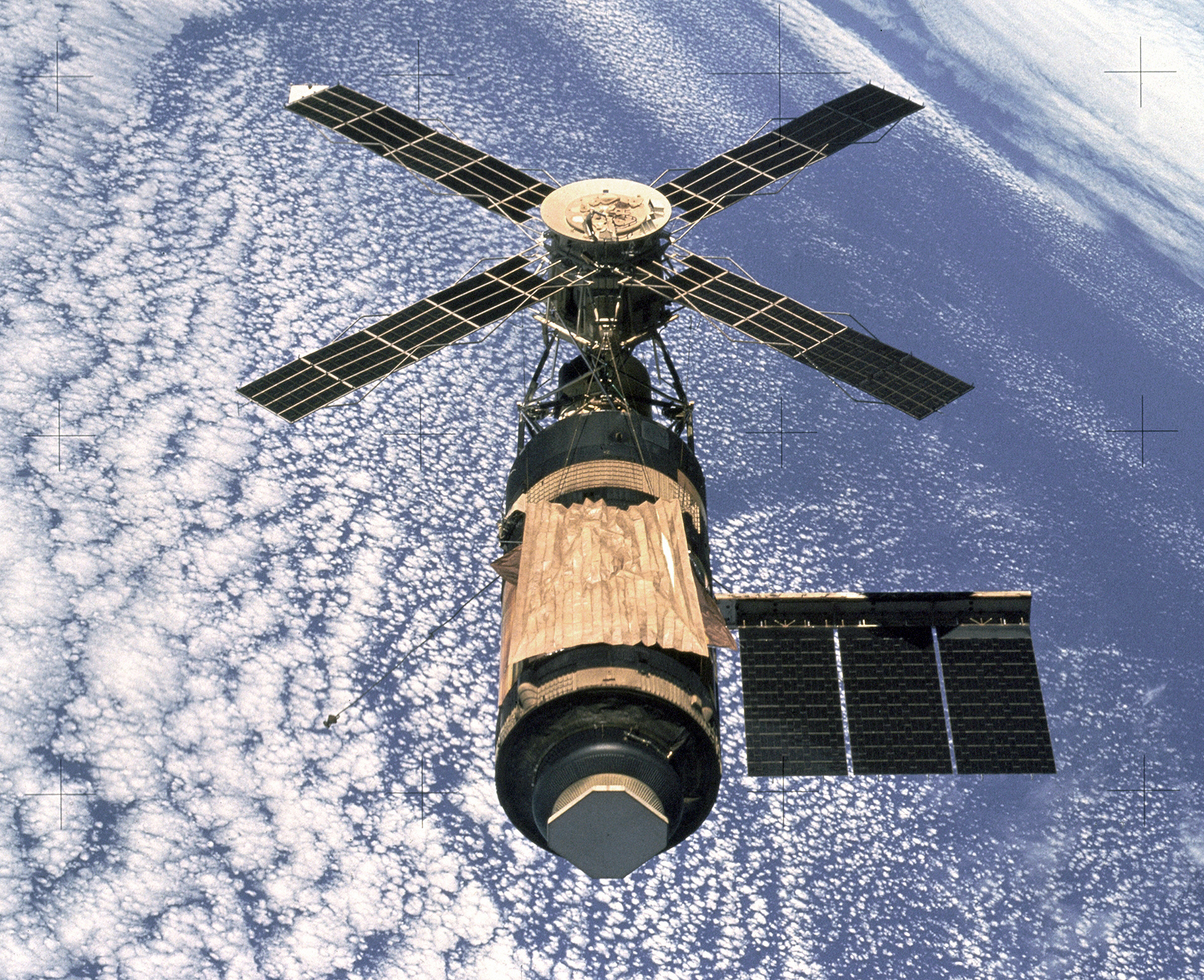

Skylab was launched and operated by NASA and was the United States' first space station. Skylab orbited Earth from 1973 to 1979, and included a workshop, a solar observatory, and other systems. It was launched uncrewed by a modified Saturn V rocket, with a weight of 169,950 pounds (77,090 kg). Three crewed missions to the station, conducted between 1973 and 1974 using the Apollo command and service module (CSM) atop the smaller Saturn IB, each delivered a three-astronaut crew. On the last two crewed missions, an additional Apollo / Saturn IB stood by ready to rescue the crew in orbit if it was needed.

=== Mir (USSR/Russia, 1986–2001) ===
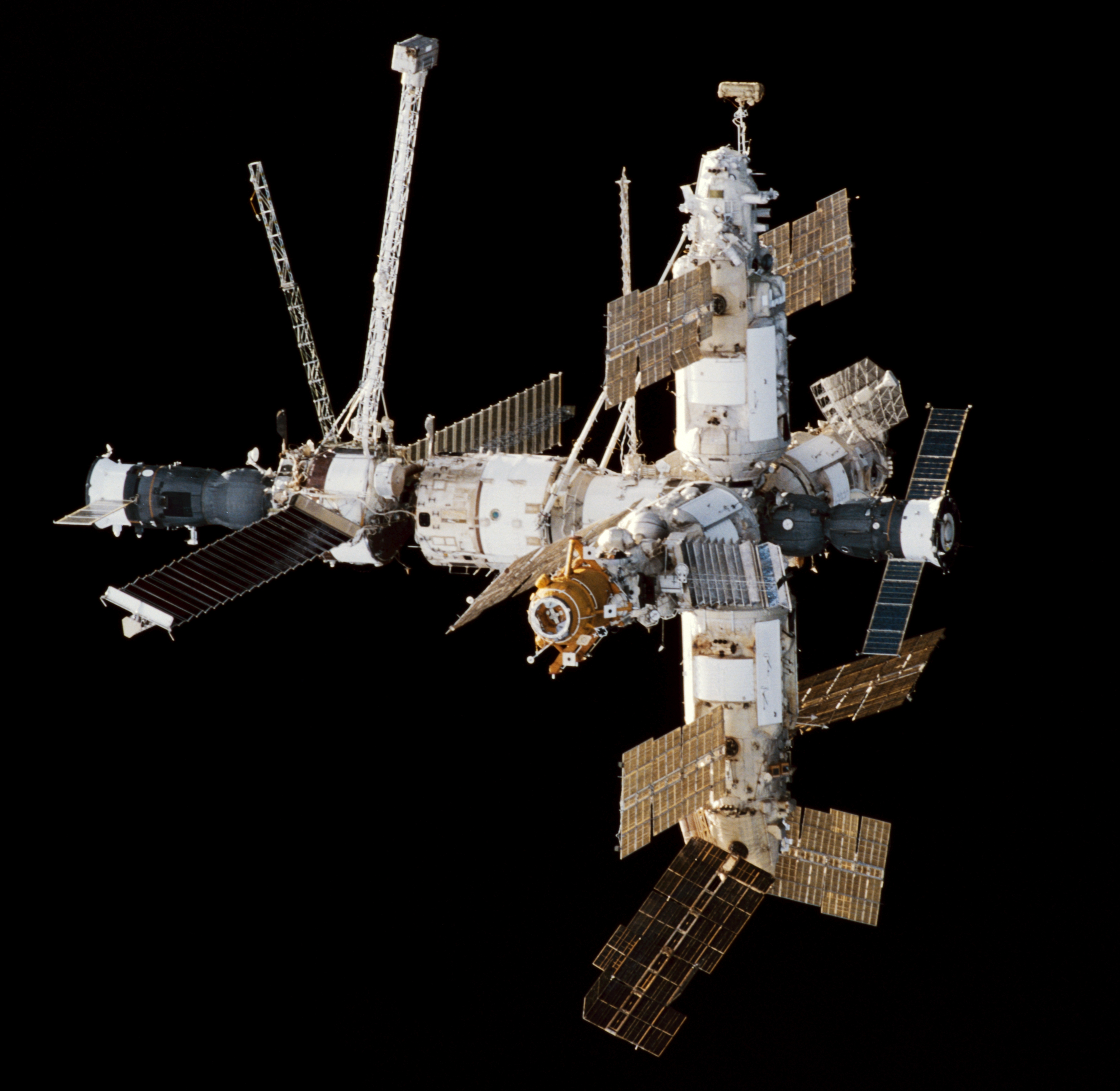

Mir was the first modular space station and was assembled in orbit from 1986 to 1996. It had a greater mass than any previous spacecraft. Until 21 March 2001 it was the largest artificial satellite in orbit, succeeded by the International Space Station after Mir's orbit decayed. The station served as a microgravity research laboratory in which crews conducted experiments in biology, human biology, physics, astronomy, meteorology and spacecraft systems with a goal of developing technologies required for permanent occupation of space.

Mir was the first continuously inhabited long-term research station in orbit and set the record for the longest continuous human presence in space at 3,644 days until 23 October 2010 when it was surpassed by the ISS. It holds the record for the longest single human spaceflight, with Valeri Polyakov spending 437 days and 18 hours on the station between 1994 and 1995. Mir was occupied for a total of twelve and a half years out of its fifteen-year lifespan, having the capacity to support a resident crew of three, or larger crews for short term visits. Mir had 28 long duration crews.

=== International Space Station (USA, Russia, Japan, Europe, Canada, 1998–ongoing) ===
The International Space Station (ISS) is a space station in low Earth orbit. Its first component launched into orbit in 1998, and the ISS is now the largest artificial body in orbit and can often be seen with the naked eye from Earth. The ISS consists of pressurized modules, external trusses, solar arrays and other components. ISS components have been launched by Russian Proton and Soyuz rockets as well as American Space Shuttles.

The ISS program is a joint project among five participating space agencies: NASA, Roscosmos, JAXA, ESA, and CSA. The ownership and use of the space station is established by intergovernmental treaties and agreements. The station is divided into two sections, the Russian Orbital Segment (ROS) and the United States Orbital Segment (USOS), which is shared by many nations. The American portion of ISS was funded until 2024. Roscosmos has also endorsed the continued operation of ISS through 2024, but have proposed subsequently using elements of the Russian Orbital Segment to construct a new Russian space station called OPSEK.

As of May 2022 there have been 66 long duration crews.

=== Tiangong program (China, 2010–ongoing) ===
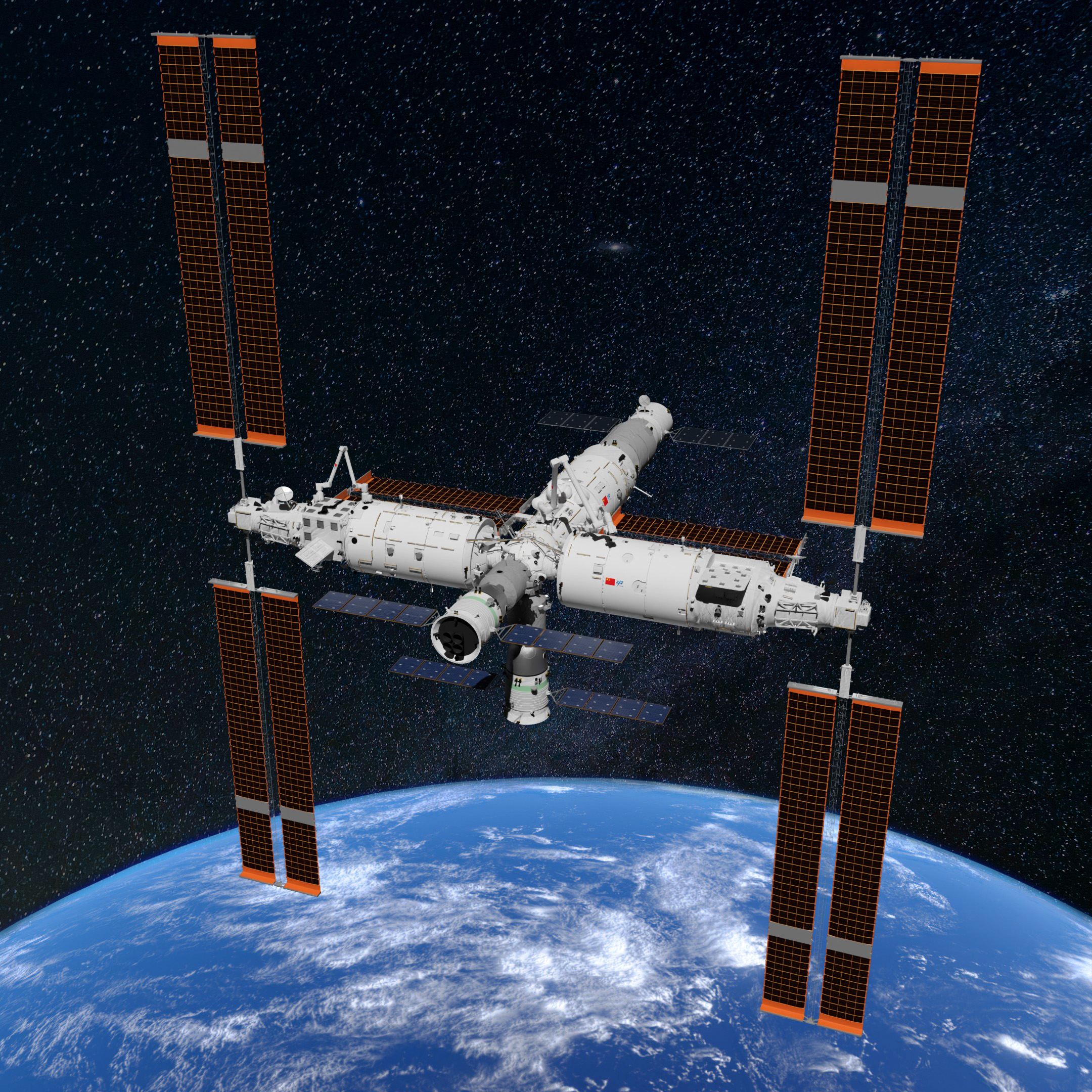
Chinese Tiangong Space Station

In 2011, China launched the Tiangong 1 target spacecraft and Shenzhou 8 uncrewed spacecraft. The two spacecraft completed China's first automatic rendezvous and docking on 3 November 2011. About 9 months later, Tiangong 1 completed the first manual rendezvous and docking with Shenzhou 9, which carried China's first female astronaut Liu Yang.

In September 2016, Tiangong 2 was launched into the orbit. It was a space laboratory with more advanced functions and equipment than Tiangong 1. A month later, Shenzhou 11 was launched and docked with Tiangong 2. Two astronauts entered Tiangong 2 and stationed for about 30 days and verified the viability of astronauts' medium-term stay in space. In April 2017, China's first cargo spacecraft, Tianzhou 1 docked with Tiangong 2 and completed multiple in-orbit propellant refueling tests.

The goal of the next phase of China Manned Space Program is to build China's own space station, Tiangong. The first module of Tiangong, the Tianhe core module, was launched into orbit by China's most powerful rocket Long March 5B on 29 April 2021. It was later visited by multiple cargo and crewed spacecraft and demonstrated China's capability of sustaining Chinese astronauts' long-term stay in space.

According to CMS announcement, all missions of Tiangong Space Station are scheduled to be carried out by the end of 2022. Once the construction is completed, Tiangong will enter the application and development phase, which is poised to last for no less than 10 years.

== Space programs currently in development ==
Programs in this section are sorted by the years when their development started.

=== Dream Chaser (USA, 2004–ongoing) ===
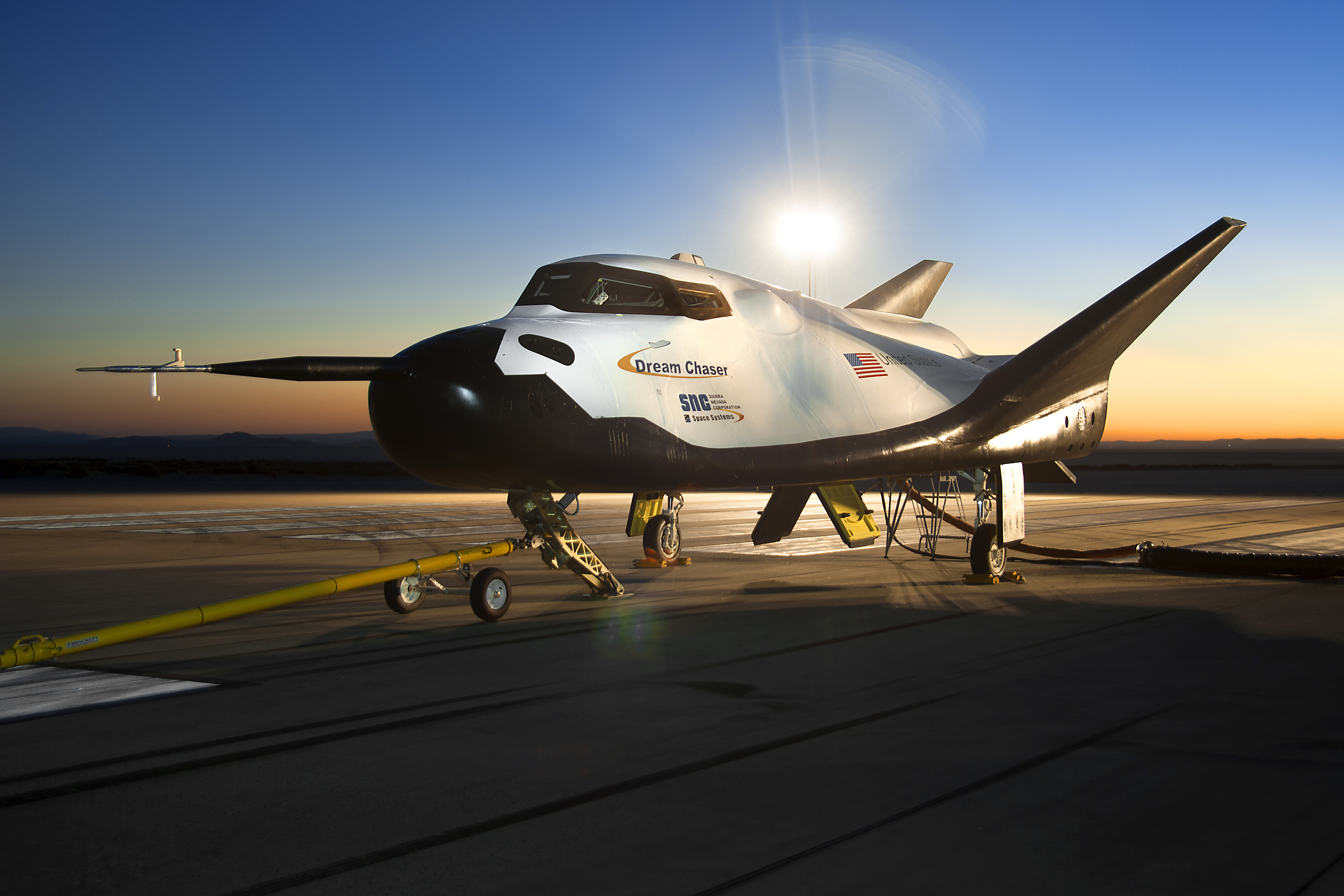
Dream Chaser flight vehicle at NASA's Dryden Flight Research Center, Edwards Air Force Base for tow tests on taxi and runways

The Dream Chaser was originally intended to serve as an American reusable crewed suborbital and orbital lifting-body spaceplane being developed and privately funded by Sierra Nevada Corporation (SNC) Space Systems. It is now planned to be a robotic cargo transport to the ISS. The Dream Chaser was designed to carry up to seven people to and from low Earth orbit prior to the decision to transition to a robotic platform. The vehicle would launch vertically on an Atlas V rocket and land horizontally on conventional runways. On 26 October 2013, the first glide flight occurred. An initial orbital test flight of the Dream Chaser orbital test vehicle was planned for 1 November 2016, which was not met. On 3 February 2015, the Sierra Nevada Corporation's (SNC) Space Systems and OHB System AG (OHB) in Germany announced the completion of the initial Dream Chaser for European Utilization (DC4EU) study.

=== Indian Human Spaceflight Programme (India, 2007–ongoing) ===
The Indian Human Spaceflight Programme (HSP) of the Indian Space Research Organisation (ISRO) plans to develop and launch a crewed spacecraft, named Gaganyaan, to low Earth orbit no earlier than 2025.

=== SPICA (Denmark, 2008–ongoing) ===
Copenhagen Suborbitals is an amateur crowd-funded, human space programme. Since its beginning in 2008, Copenhagen Suborbitals has flown five home-built rockets and two mock-up space capsules. Their stated goal is to have one of the members fly into space (above 100 km), on a sub-orbital spaceflight, in a space capsule on the Spica rocket.

HEAT 1X Tycho Brahe was the first rocket and spacecraft combination built by Copenhagen Suborbitals, a Danish organization attempting to perform the first amateur suborbital crewed spaceflight. The vehicle consisted of a motor named HEAT-1X and a spacecraft Tycho Brahe.

In 2014, Copenhagen Suborbitals settled on the basic design for their first crewed rocket and space capsule. The rocket will be named Spica, and will stand 12–14 m tall with a diameter of 950 mm. It will be powered by the BPM-100 engine class, using liquid oxygen as oxidizer and ethanol as fuel, producing 100 kilonewtons of thrust.

=== Orel (Russia, 2009–ongoing) ===
Formerly called PPTS (Prospective Piloted Transport System) and Federation (Russian: Федерация, Federatsiya) Orel is a new multi-task Russian spacecraft for LEO, ISS and lunar missions. The spacecraft, when revealed in 2015, resembled NASA's Orion capsule and had a set of soft-landing type legs similar to the plans for Dragon 2 at that time. An uncrewed flight is planned in 2024.

=== New Glenn (USA, 2012–ongoing) ===
New Glenn is an orbital launch vehicle under development by Blue Origin. The company expects a first flight no earlier 2023. Like New Shepard, the first stage is designed to land vertically to be reusable. It can launch either a cargo or a crew capsule to space.

=== Starship (USA, 2012-ongoing) ===
The SpaceX Starship is a fully reusable super heavy-lift launch vehicle under development by SpaceX since 2012, as a self-funded private spaceflight project.

The second stage of the Starship is designed as a long-duration cargo and passenger-carrying spacecraft. In 2020 and 2021 it was tested without a booster stage as part of the development program to get launch and landing working and iterate on a variety of design details, particularly with respect to the vehicle's atmospheric reentry.

=== Iranian crewed spaceship project (Iran, 2015–ongoing) ===
The Iranian crewed spacecraft is a proposal by the Iranian Aerospace Research Institute of Iranian Space Research Center (ISRC) to put an astronaut into space. The details of the design were published by the institute in its "Astronaut" publication in February 2015. The head of the institute announced that the spaceship will be launched to space in about a year. The spaceship is supposed be able to carry a single astronaut to a 175 km height and return him to the Earth. The spaceship is designed under the code name "Class E Kavoshgar" project. Through December 2022, no further details have been published and no crewed launches have occurred. In March 2026, during the 2026 Iran war, all ISRC facilities were attacked and destroyed by Israel.

=== Artemis program (USA, 2017–ongoing) ===

The Artemis program is an ongoing crewed spaceflight program carried out by NASA, U.S. commercial spaceflight companies, and international partners such as ESA. Artemis would be the first step towards the long-term goal of establishing a sustainable presence on the Moon, laying the foundation for private companies to build a lunar economy, and eventually sending humans to Mars.

Artemis I was the first mission of the Artemis Program and was the first integrated flight of the Space Launch System and the Orion (spacecraft). During the mission, an uncrewed Orion capsule spent 10 days in a 40,000 mi (64,000 km) distant retrograde orbit around the Moon before returning to Earth.

Artemis II, the first crewed mission of the program, launched four astronauts in April 2026 on a free-return flyby of the Moon at a distance of 4,700 miles (7,600 km).

=== Commercial space stations (planned) ===
- Bigelow Commercial Space Station (USA): A Bigelow inflatable module was attached to the ISS on April 8, 2016, where it will remain for a testing period of two years. Any independent Bigelow Commercial space station will have to await the development of commercially available human rated orbital spacecraft. The first of these are expected to be the SpaceX Dragon 2 and the Boeing CST-100 Starliner in 2020.
- Orbital Technologies Commercial Space Station (Russia)

== Programs canceled before crewed launch ==
Programs in this section are sorted by the years when their development started.

=== Man In Space Soonest (USA, 1957–1958) ===
Man In Space Soonest was a United States Air Force program to put an American astronaut in orbit. It was canceled when NASA was formed in August 1958.

=== Dyna-Soar (USA, 1957–1963) ===
The X-20 Dyna-Soar (Dynamic Soarer) was a United States Air Force program to develop a crewed spaceplane that could be used for a variety of military missions, including reconnaissance, bombing, space rescue, satellite maintenance, and sabotage of enemy satellites. The program ran from 24 October 1957 to 10 December 1963 and was canceled just after spacecraft construction had begun.

=== Manned Orbital Development System (USA, 1962–1963) ===
The Manned Orbital Development System was a project by the Air Force Space System Division (SSD). It was to begin working on plans to use Gemini hardware as the first step in a new US Air Force man-in-space program called MODS (Manned Orbital Development System), a type of military space station that used Gemini spacecraft as ferry vehicles. MODS was effectively superseded when the Manned Orbital Laboratory was announced in December 1963.

=== Soviet Orbital Station 1 (Soviet Union 1962–1965) ===
Western nickname "Battlestar Khrushchev" a nuclear-armed monolith station, about 5 times the volume of Salyut 1 and as heavy as Skylab. The station was designed for a crew of 6 and proceeded to mock-up stage before cancellation.

=== Manned Orbiting Laboratory (USA, 1963–1969) ===
The Manned Orbiting Laboratory (MOL) was part of the United States Air Force's crewed spaceflight program, a successor to the canceled X-20 Dyna-Soar project. It was announced to the public on the same day that the Dyna-Soar program was canceled, 10 December 1963. the program was redirected in the mid-1960s and developed as a space station used for reconnaissance purposes. The space station used a spacecraft that was derived from NASA's Gemini program. The project was canceled on 10 June 1969 before there were any crewed flights.

=== Spiral program (Soviet Union, 1965 – late 1970s) ===
In accordance with the quinquennial plan of the Soviet air forces, the Spiral program to develop a 2-stage launcher plane began in 1965 and was entrusted to OKB-155 A.I.Mikojan whose chief of the engineering and design department was Lozino Lozinsky (55 years). The project received the name of SPIRAL and was to prepare the Soviet Union for a war in space.

=== TKS (Soviet Union, 1970–1991) ===
The TKS spacecraft (Russian: Транспортный корабль снабжения, Transportnyi Korabl Snabzheniia, Transport Supply Spacecraft, GRAU index 11F72) was a Soviet spacecraft conceived in the late 1960s for resupply flights to the military Almaz space station. The spacecraft was designed for both crewed and autonomous uncrewed cargo resupply flights, but was never used operationally in its intended role – only four test missions were flown (including three that docked to Salyut space stations) during the program. The Functional Cargo Block (FGB) of the TKS spacecraft later formed the basis of several space station modules, including the Zarya FGB module on the International Space Station.

=== Buran program (Soviet Union, 1976–1993) ===
The Soviet Buran program was a reusable spaceplane project begun in 1976 at TsAGI as a response to the United States Space Shuttle program. It had only one orbital flight, an uncrewed test, before cancellation. In the process it became the first spaceplane to land autonomously.

=== Shuguang (China, 1968–1972) ===
The Shuguang program was the first Chinese crewed space program with plans to launch two astronauts by 1973.

=== Piloted FSW program (China, 1978–1980) ===
The Piloted FSW program was the second Chinese crewed space program based on the successful achievement of landing technology (third in the world after USSR and USA) by FSW satellites.

=== Saenger (Germany, 1985) ===
The Saenger was a proposed two stage to orbit vehicle. Air-breathing hypersonic first stage and delta wing second stage. The German Hypersonics Program and its Saenger II reference vehicle received most of the domestic funding for spaceplane development in the late 1980s and early 1990s. In 1995, the project was discontinued primarily due to concerns of development costs and limited gains in price and performance compared to the existing space launch systems such as the Ariane 5 rocket.

=== HOTOL (UK, 1986–1988) ===
HOTOL, for Horizontal Take-Off and Landing, was a 1980s British design for a single-stage-to-orbit (SSTO) spaceplane that was to be powered by an airbreathing jet engine. Development was being conducted by a consortium led by Rolls-Royce and British Aerospace (BAe).

=== Zarya (Soviet Union, 1986–1989) ===
The Zarya spacecraft was a secret Soviet project of the late 1980s aiming to design and build a large, crewed, vertical takeoff, vertical landing (VTVL) reusable space capsule, a much larger replacement for the Soyuz (spacecraft). The project was shelved in 1989, shortly before the Soviet Union's collapse.

=== Rockwell X-30 (USA, 1986–1993) ===
The Rockwell X-30 was an advanced technology demonstrator project for the National Aero-Space Plane (NASP), part of a United States project to create a single-stage-to-orbit (SSTO) spacecraft and passenger spaceliner. See also List of X-planes.

=== Hermes (ESA, 1987–1993) ===
Hermes was a proposed spaceplane designed by the French Centre National d'Études Spatiales (CNES) in 1975, and later by the European Space Agency (ESA). It was superficially similar to the American Boeing X-20 Dyna-Soar and the larger Space Shuttle.

=== MAKS (Soviet Union, 1988–1991) ===
The MAKS (Russian: МАКС (Многоцелевая авиационно-космическая система), Multipurpose aerospace system) was a Soviet air-launched reusable launch system project with orbiter that was proposed in 1988 but canceled in 1991.

=== HOPE-X (Japan, 1980s–2003) ===
HOPE-X was a Japanese experimental spaceplane project designed by a partnership between NASDA and NAL (both now part of JAXA), started in the 1980s. It was positioned for most of its lifetime as one of the main Japanese contributions to the International Space Station, the other being the Japanese Experiment Module. The project was eventually canceled in 2003, by which point test flights of a sub-scale testbed had flown successfully.

=== RAKS (Russia, 1993–?) ===
The Russian Aerospace Aircraft (RAKS) is being created within the framework of the research work (SRW) "Orel" commissioned by the Russian Aerospace Agency since 1993.

=== Kankoh-maru (Japan, 1995) ===
The Kankoh-maru (観光丸? Kankōmaru) is the name of a proposed vertical takeoff and landing (VTVL), single-stage-to-orbit (SSTO), reusable launch system (rocket-powered spacecraft).

=== Ansari X Prize (World, 1996–2004) ===
The Ansari X Prize was a space competition in which the X Prize Foundation offered a US$10,000,000 prize for the first non-government organization to launch a reusable crewed spacecraft into space twice within two weeks. Twenty-six teams from around the world participated, ranging from volunteer hobbyists to large corporate-backed operations. Won by Scaled Composites' Tier One project. The other companies stopped work or as ARCA Space Corporation switched to other, more immediate purposes.

=== Venturestar (USA, 1996–2001) ===
VentureStar was a single-stage-to-orbit reusable launch system proposed by Lockheed Martin and funded by the U.S. government. The goal was to replace the Space Shuttle by developing a reusable spaceplane that could launch satellites into orbit at a fraction of the cost.

=== Fuji (Japan, 2001) ===
Fuji (ふじ) was a crewed spacecraft of the space capsule kind, proposed by Japan's National Space Development Agency (NASDA) Advanced Mission Research Center in December 2001. The Fuji design was ultimately not developed.

=== Hopper (ESA, 2000) ===
Hopper was a proposed European Space Agency orbital and reusable launch vehicle. The shuttle prototype spaceplane was one of several proposals for a European reusable launch vehicle (RLV) planned to cheaply ferry satellites into orbit by 2015. There have been no launches.

=== Kliper (Russia, 2004–2007) ===
Kliper (Russian: Клипер, Clipper) was a partly reusable crewed spacecraft concept, proposed in the early 2000s by RSC Energia. Due to lack of funding from the ESA and RSA, the project was indefinitely postponed by 2006.

=== Project Constellation (USA, 2004–2010) ===
Project Constellation, NASA's intended successor to the Space Shuttle, is a program to develop new crafts and respective delivery systems for increased operation in space. It is primarily intended to facilitate missions for International Space Station resupply, lunar landing, etc.

The Constellation program was canceled in 2010 and replaced with the Artemis program based on the Space Launch System.

=== XCOR Lynx (USA, 2008–2016) ===
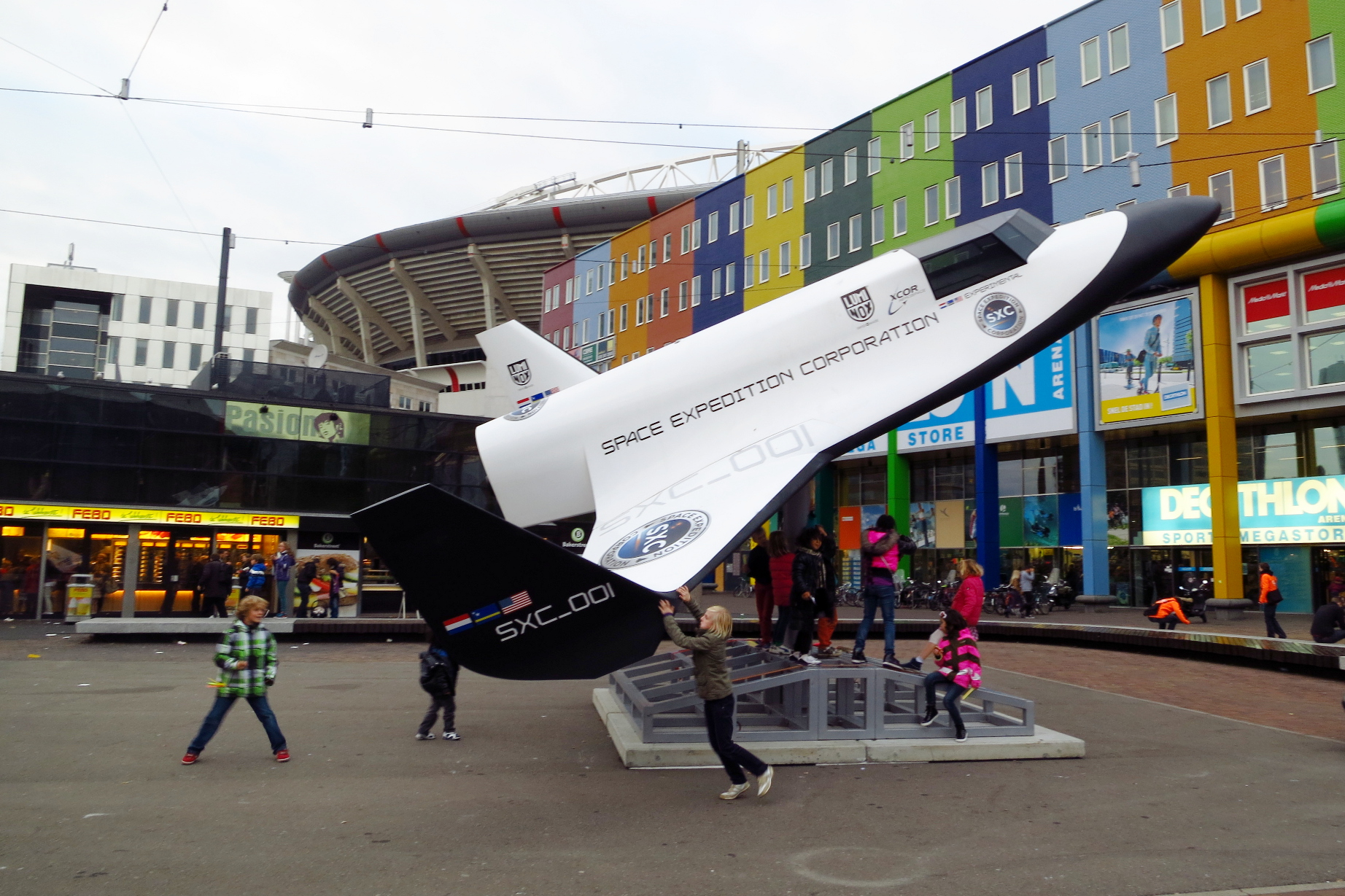

The XCOR Lynx is a suborbital horizontal-takeoff, horizontal-landing (HTHL), rocket-powered spaceplane under development by the California-based company XCOR Aerospace to compete in the emerging suborbital spaceflight market. The Lynx is projected to carry one pilot, a ticketed passenger, and/or a payload above 100 km altitude. The Mark I test model will reach only 200,000 feet (61 km); the Mark II production model will be sub-orbital.

According to a September 2015 report, the first flight of the Lynx spaceplane was proposed to be in the second quarter of 2016 from Midland, Texas, but the company halted spaceplane development in May 2016 and refocused on its LOX/H2 engine technology.

Unilever's Axe Apollo Space Academy marketing campaign which was launched in 2013 was also affected by the cancellation of the XCOR Lynx. The campaign included an astronaut selection contest where 23 winners would be given suborbital spaceflights on board the Lynx.

=== OPSEK (Russia, 2009–2017) ===
The Orbital Piloted Assembly and Experiment Complex (abbreviated OPSEK) was a proposed third-generation modular space station in Low Earth orbit. OPSEK would initially consist of modules from the Russian Orbital Segment of the International Space Station (ISS) from 2024. It would then add new modules to it. It was canceled in 2017.

== Summary ==
Summary of human spaceflight programs
Program	Organization	Destination	Missions				Astronauts flown	First crewed flight	Last crewed flight	Status	Picture
Program	Organization	Destination	Successful	Partial failure	Failure	Total	Astronauts flown	First crewed flight	Last crewed flight	Status	Picture
Vostok	(Soviet Union) Soviet space program	Low Earth orbit	3	3	1	7	12	12 April 1961	16 June 1963	Successful (1956–1963)	
Project Mercury	(United States) NASA	Low Earth orbit	11	1	3	15	6	5 May 1961	15 May 1963	Successful (1958–1963)	
North American X-15	(United States) USAF and NASA	Sub-orbital	13	0	0	13	1 (Note: Of thirteen flights, only two piloted by Joseph A. Walker exceeded the 100 km (62 mi) altitude (Kármán line). Eight pilots flew above 80 km (50 mi), thereby qualifying as astronauts according to the US Armed Forces' definition of the space border.)	17 July 1962	21 August 1968	Successful (1958–1963)	
Voskhod	(Soviet Union) Soviet space program	Low Earth orbit	4	0	1	5	2	12 October 1964	18 March 1965	Successful (1964–1966)	
Project Gemini	(United States) NASA	Low Earth orbit	10	2	0	12	16	23 March 1965	11 November 1966	Successful (1961–1966)	
Soyuz	(Soviet Union) Soviet space program and (Russia) Roscosmos	Low Earth orbit, Salyut 1, 3, 4, 5, 6 & 7, Mir, ISS	153	0	2	155	170	23 April 1967	8 April 2025	Active (1967–present)	
Apollo	(United States) NASA	Moon	26	0	1	27	30	11 October 1968	7 December 1972	Successful (1961–1975)	
Space Shuttle	(United States) NASA	Low Earth orbit, Spacelab, ISS	134	0	1	135	355	12 April 1981	8 July 2011	Successful (1972–2011)	
China Manned Space Program	(China) CMSA	Low Earth orbit, Tiangong-1, Tiangong-2, Tiangong	34	1	0	35	26	15 October 2003	24 April 2025	Active (1992–present)	
SpaceShipTwo	(United Kingdom) (United States) Virgin Galactic	Sub-orbital	3	0	0	3	2	21 June 2004	8 June 2024	Active (2003–present)	Unavailable
Commercial Crew	(United States) NASA, Boeing, SpaceX	ISS	10	0	0	10	36	15 November 2020	14 March 2025	Active (2011–present)	
New Shepard	(United States) Blue Origin	Sub-orbital	27	0	0	27	52	20 July 2021	14 April 2025	Active (2006–present)	
Artemis	(United States) NASA and partners	Moon	2	0	0	2	4	1 April 2026	1 April 2026	Active (2017–present)	
Dream Chaser	(United States) Sierra Space	ISS	0	0	0	0	0	TBD	—N/a	Under-development (2004–present)	
Indian Human Spaceflight Programme	(India) HSFC	Low Earth orbit, Bharatiya Antariksh Station	0	0	0	0	0	TBD 2027	—N/a	Under-development (2007–present)	
Copenhagen Suborbitals	(Denmark) Copenhagen Suborbitals	Sub-orbital	0	0	0	0	0	TBD	—N/a	Under-development (2008–present)	
Orel	(Russia) Roscosmos	Low Earth orbit, ISS, Moon	0	0	0	0	0	TBD	—N/a	Under-development (2009–present)	
New Glenn	(United States) Blue Origin	Low Earth orbit, ISS, Moon	1	0	0	1	0	TBD	—N/a	Under-development (2012–present)	
SpaceX Starship	(United States) SpaceX	Low Earth orbit, ISS, Moon, Mars	4	0	4	8	0	TBD	—N/a	Under-development (2012–present)	
Iranian crewed spacecraft	(Iran) Iranian Space Agency	Low Earth orbit	0	0	0	0	0	TBD	—N/a	Under-development (2015–present)	Unavailable

== See also ==
- Human spaceflight
- List of crewed spacecraft
- List of private spaceflight companies
- List of human spaceflights
  - 1961-1970
  - 1971-1980
  - 1981-1990
  - 1991-2000
  - 2001-2010
  - 2011-2020
  - 2021-present

== Bibliography ==
- Grush, Loren (May 17, 2019). "NASA administrator on new Moon plan: 'We're doing this in a way that's never been done before'". The Verge.
