= Big G =

Big G may refer to:

== Geography ==
- Big G, an attraction in Gracemere, Queensland, Australis
- The Big G, a landmark in Glasgow, Scotland, set up for the 2014 Commonwealth Games

== People ==
- Jason Giambi, American baseball player
- Giancarlo Stanton, American baseball player

== Other uses ==
- Big Gemini, an advanced version of the Gemini program spacecraft system
- Gravitational constant, a physical constant involved in the calculation of gravitational effects
- Takeshi "Gian" Goda, a character from Doraemon, referred to as "Big G" in English language adaptations

== See also ==
- G, the letter
- General Mills
