= List of space artifacts in the Smithsonian Institution =

List of space artifacts at museums

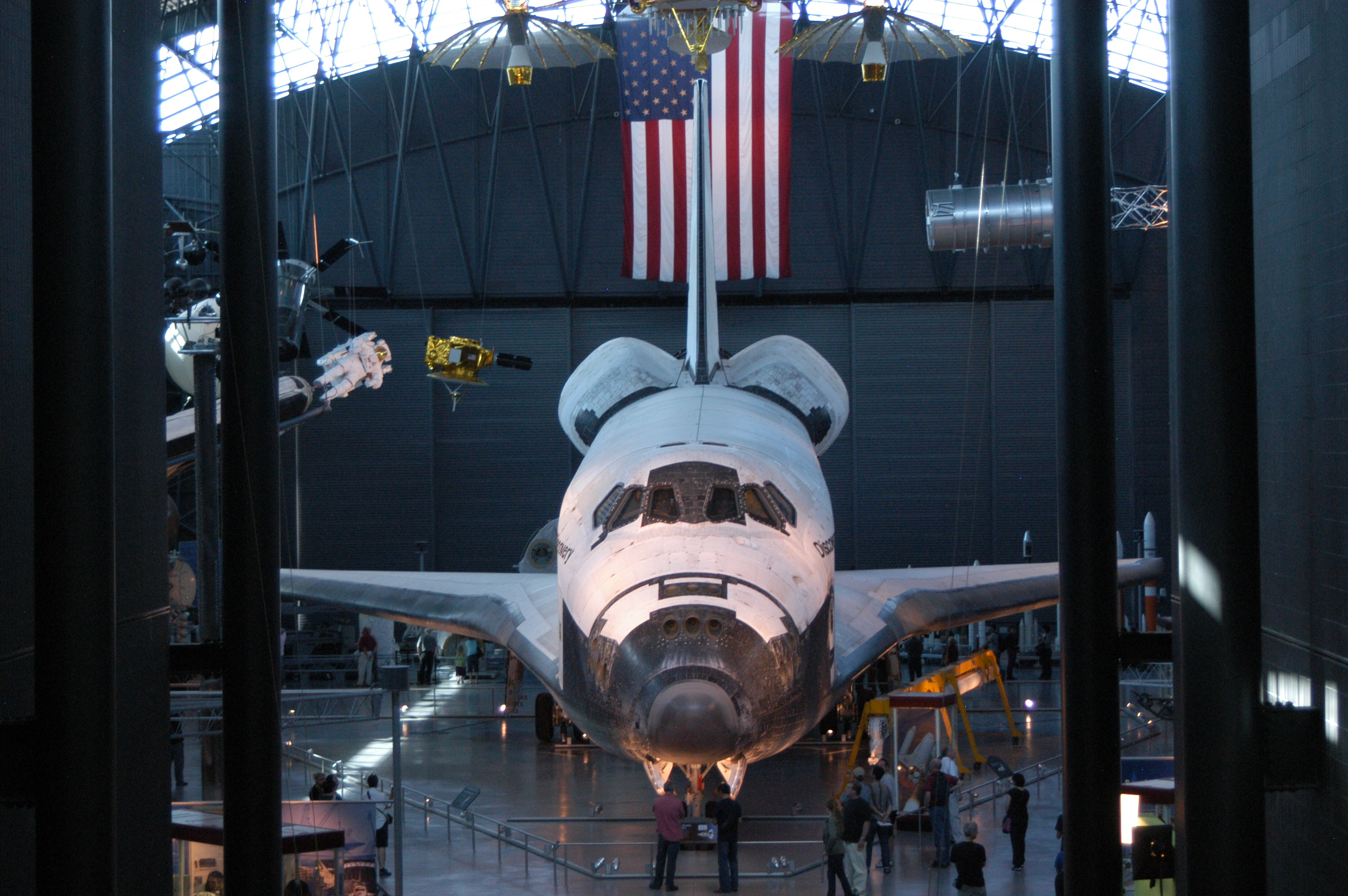
Space Shuttle Discovery at the Udvar-Hazy Center in September 2012

The List of space artifacts in the Smithsonian Institution includes space artifacts exhibited in the Smithsonian Institution's National Air and Space Museum, Steven F. Udvar-Hazy Center, and the Paul E. Garber Preservation, Restoration, and Storage Facility. The Smithsonian Institution's collection of space artifacts is the largest on display in the world.

== Space artifacts displayed at the National Air and Space Museum ==
- Apollo 11 Command Module Columbia capsule
- Apollo-Soyuz Test Project replica
- Explorer 1 replica
- Mercury Friendship 7 capsule
- Gemini 7
- Hubble Space Telescope test article and backup mirror
- Pioneer H
- Skylab B
- Sputnik replica
- V-2 rocket
- Vanguard TV3

== Large space artifacts displayed at the Steven F. Udvar-Hazy Center ==
Opened in 2003, the Steven F. Udvar-Hazy Center, located near Washington Dulles International Airport in Fairfax County, Virginia, features thousands of artifacts for which insufficient space could be found for display in the museum's National Mall building. The James S. McDonnell Space Hangar, opened in 2004, is incorporated into the Udvar-Hazy Center.

- Advanced Orbiting Solar Observatory
- Aerobee Heliostat Nosecone, Infrared Telescope, and Instrument Rack
- Aerobee Nose Cone Shell
- Agena-B Upper Stage
- Airborne Infrared Telescope
- Alouette satellite
- Antisatellite Missile
- Apollo Boilerplate Command Module
- Applications Technology Satellite, ATS-1
- Ariane 4 Rocket Model
- Viking 5C rocket engine
- Ariel 1 satellite replica
- Atlas-Agena Launch Console
- Atlas-Centaur Rocket Model
- Atoll Missile
- BMW 109-558 Rocket Engine and Propellant Tanks
- Bat Missile
- Bell No. 2 Rocket Belt
- Blohm und Voss Bv 246B Hagelkorn
- Caltech Infrared Telescope
- Corona Film Return Capsule
- Corporal Missile
- Echo 1 Communications Satellite replica
- Explorer 1 satellite mock-up
- Explorer 6 satellite replica
- Explorer 7 satellite replica
- Explorer 8 satellite replica
- Explorer 10 satellite replica
- Explorer 12 satellite replica
- Explorer 17 satellite replica
- F-1 (rocket engine) engine
- F-23 Ramjet Research Vehicle
- Far Side Sounding Rocket
- Gargoyle Missile
- Gemini Paraglider Research Vehicle 1-A
- Gemini TTV-1 Paraglider Capsule
- Gemini 7 Spacecraft
- Goddard 1935 A-Series Rocket
- H-1 Rocket Engine
- H-I Rocket Model
- H-II Rocket Model
- Homing Overlay Experiment Test Vehicle
- Hs 117 Schmetterling Missile
- Hs 293 A-1 Missile
- Hs 298 Missile
- IDEX II work station
- IMP-A satellite
- International Ultraviolet Explorer control and display console
- John Glenn's training couch
- Jupiter S-3 Rocket Engine
- Katydid Drone
- LOFTI-I satellite
- Lark Missile
- Littrow Spectrograph
- Loki-Dart Sounding Rocket
- Loon Missile
- MIDAS Series III infrared sensor
- Manned Maneuvering Unit
- Mariner 10 replica
- Mars Pathfinder airbags and lander prototype
- Mars Sojourner rover model
- Mercury Capsule "Big Joe"
- Mercury Capsule 15B, Freedom 7 II
- Mighty Mouse Missile
- Mobile Quarantine Facility
- Navajo Rocket Engine
- New Horizons model
- Nike-Ajax Missile
- Nike-Cajun Sounding Rocket
- Pegasus-XL Launch Vehicle
- Pioneer 1 satellite
- Pioneer V satellite
- UGM-73 Poseidon C-3 missile
- Raytheon Standard Missile 3
- Redstone Missile
- Relay 1 Communications Satellite
- Saturn V Instrument Ring
- Sidewinder Missile
- Skeet (KDC-2)
- Snark Guidance System
- Space Shuttle Discovery
- Space Shuttle Main Engine
- Sparrow 2 Missile
- Spartan 201 Satellite
- Styx Missile
- Subroc Antisubmarine Missile
- Talos Missile
- Tiny Tim Missile
- Titan 1 Rocket Engine
- Tracking and Data Relay Satellite
- Univac 1232 Computer
- Vanguard 3 satellite
- Vanguard Lyman Alpha satellite
- Vanguard Magnetometer satellite
- Vega French balloon
- Vega Solar System Probe Bus and Landing Apparatus
- X-259 Antares II Rocket Motor
- XKD5G-1 Target Drone
- Zuni missile

== Artifacts on loan ==
- Gemini spacecraft No. 2, the Gemini-B prototype and Gemini 2 mission capsule; on loan to the USAF
