= Pishgam =

Iranian space capsule and rocket

Pishgam (Persian: پیشگام, "pioneer") is an Iranian 300-kilogramme space capsule and associated rocket (کاوشگر پیشگام Kavoshgar-Pishgam "Explorer-Pioneer"), which launched containing rhesus monkey and is part of a series of Iranian rocket launches containing biological cargo intended as precursors to human spaceflight.

== Kavoshgar programme ==
The sounding rocket plus return capsule combination are capable of undertaking a twenty-minute flight and reach a height of 120 km. This is a sub-orbital flight not similar to the Safir rocket which launched Omid, a domestically-built data-processing satellite into low Earth orbit.

The objective is to prepare for crewed space flight after 2020, by sending monkeys into space. The Iranian Space Agency said before the first launch that they had five adolescent rhesus monkeys from South East Asia. The monkey's health is checked before launch and the launch is intended to demonstrate that the life support systems work and that the monkey will land in good health.

=== Kavoshgar-3 ===
On February 3, 2010, ISA launched a Kavoshgar-3 (Explorer-3) rocket with one rodent, two turtles, and several worms into sub-orbital space and returned them to Earth alive. The rocket was enabled to transfer electronic data and live footage back to Earth. The Aerospace Research Institute (ARI) showed live video transmission of mini-environmental lab to enable further studies on the biological capsule. This was the first biological payload launched by Iran.

=== Kavoshgar-4 ===
On March 15, 2011, the ISA launched the Kavoshgar-4 (Explorer-4) rocket carrying a test capsule designed to carry a monkey but without living creatures on board. The sub-orbital flight reached an apogee of 135 kilometres (84 mi) and landed 130 kilometres (81 mi) from the launch site. It contained the equipment to house the monkey, without an actual monkey.

=== Kavoshgar-5 ===
Kavoshgar-5 (Explorer-5), carrying a live monkey, was launched for a 20-minute sub-orbital flight in September 2011, however the mission failed. The capsule contained a rhesus monkey. On October 3, Iran indefinitely postponed further plans while scientists reviewed readiness for future missions.

=== Kavoshgar-6 ===
In May 2012, Iran announced that it would send more living creatures into space by the summer.

On 1 August 2012 Hamid Fazeli from the Iranian Space Agency announced that the monkey would be launched after Ramadan, which ended on 19 August 2012. There were no subsequent announcements until December 2012 when it was said that the launch would be soon.

On 28 January 2013 Iran claimed that they had launched a monkey, Fargam, into space. ISNA officials then did not comment on the flight until 31 January, when ISNA published a video of the Pishgam Launch, with an internal camera. However, it was noted that the monkey shown in the video had a prominent mole over its left eye, which the monkey in the initial announcement did not. Investigations revealed that for some reason ISNA showed legitimate footage of the rocket's exterior, but recycled footage from the failed 2011 launch where the monkey died. This is particularly unusual as Iran has denied the failed 2011 launch even happened and have denied any monkey either dying or being launched earlier. ISNA spokesmen Mohammad Ebrahimi stated on 4 February that the team assembling the media for the video simply mixed up the footage of a backup monkey and the prime monkey.

=== Kavoshgar-7 ===
ISNA announced on 10 December, 2013, that they would be launching a Kavoshgar-7 mission from Imam Khomeini Space Centre some time in the next week.

== See also ==
- Monkeys and apes in space
- Animals in space
- Iranian Crewed Spacecraft
