= Iranian crewed spacecraft =

Proposal by Iranian Space Agency

The Iranian crewed spacecraft is a proposal by the Iranian Space Agency and Iranian Aerospace Research Institute of the Iranian Space Research Center (ISRC) to put an astronaut into space.

Iran expressed for the first time its intention to send a human to space during the summit of Soviet and Iranian Presidents in 1990. Soviet President Mikhail Gorbachev reached an agreement in principle with erstwhile President Akbar Hashemi Rafsanjani to make joint Soviet-Iranian crewed flights to Mir space station but agreement was never realized after dissolution of USSR.

Iranian News Agency claimed on 21 November 2005, that the Iranians have a human space program along with plans for the development of a spacecraft and a space laboratory. Iran Aerospace Industries Organization (IAIO) head Reza Taghipour on 20 August 2008, revealed Iran intends to launch a human mission into space within a decade. This goal was described as the country's top priority for the next 10 years, in order to make Iran the leading space power of the region by 2021.

In August 2010, President Ahmadinejad announced that Iran's first astronaut should be sent into space on board an Iranian spacecraft by no later than 2019.

Some details of the design were published by the institute in its "Astronaut" publication in February 2015. A mock up of the spaceship was displayed on 17 February 2015 during the ceremony of the national day of space of Iran. The head of the institute announced that the spaceship will be launched to space in about one year, which did not happen. The Iranian President and several of the ministers were present in the unveiling and the ceremony.

If funded and developed, it would be comparable to the American Mercury and Soviet Vostok spacecraft that carried the first humans into space in the early 1960s.The Iranian small capsuled spacecraft would carry a single astronaut to a 175 km altitude and return it to Earth. The spacecraft was designated the code name "Class E Kavoshgar" project. The main components include the launcher adapter, spacecraft, and the launch abort system. A sub-orbital test flight with monkey was conducted in 2016.

According to Iran's Space Administrator, this program was put on hold in 2017 indefinitely.

According to unofficial Chinese internet sources, an Iranian participation in the future Chinese space station program has been under discussion. Currently Iran doesn't have a medium lift rocket similar to Long March 2F, GSLV Mk III and H-IIA. Therefore, developing of full scale spacecraft able to dock with any station is unlikely by Iran due to the lack of equipment.

On 6 December 2023, Iran launched live animals into space in a capsule mounted on a new type of rocket called "Salman". Al Jazeera reported that the Iranian government says this is in line with its current 10 year program to revive its human space program. Iran's telecommunications director claims the effort is to send at least one Iranian astronaut to space in a fully indigenous crewed spacecraft on a fully indigenous rocket by 2029. In March 2026, during the 2026 Iran war, all ISRC facilities were attacked and destroyed by Israel.

== See also ==
- Pishgam
