= Advanced Gemini =

Proposals that would have extended the Gemini program

Advanced Gemini was a series of proposals that would have extended the Gemini program by the addition of various missions, including crewed low Earth orbit, circumlunar and lunar landing missions. Gemini was the second crewed spaceflight program operated by NASA, and consisted of a two-seat spacecraft capable of maneuvering in orbit, docking with uncrewed spacecraft such as Agena Target Vehicles, and allowing the crew to perform tethered extra-vehicular activities.

A range of applications were considered for Advanced Gemini missions, including military flights, space station crew and logistics delivery, and lunar flights. The Lunar proposals ranged from reusing the docking systems developed for the Agena target vehicle on more powerful upper stages such as the Centaur, which could propel the spacecraft to the Moon, to complete modifications of the Gemini to enable it to land on the Lunar surface. Its applications would have ranged from crewed lunar flybys before Apollo was ready, to providing emergency shelters or rescue for stranded Apollo crews, or even replacing the Apollo program.

Some of the Advanced Gemini proposals used "off-the-shelf" Gemini spacecraft, unmodified from the original program, while others featured modifications to allow the spacecraft to carry more crew, dock with space stations, visit the Moon, and perform other mission objectives. Other modifications considered included the addition of wings or a parasail to the spacecraft, in order to enable it to make a horizontal landing.

== Background ==
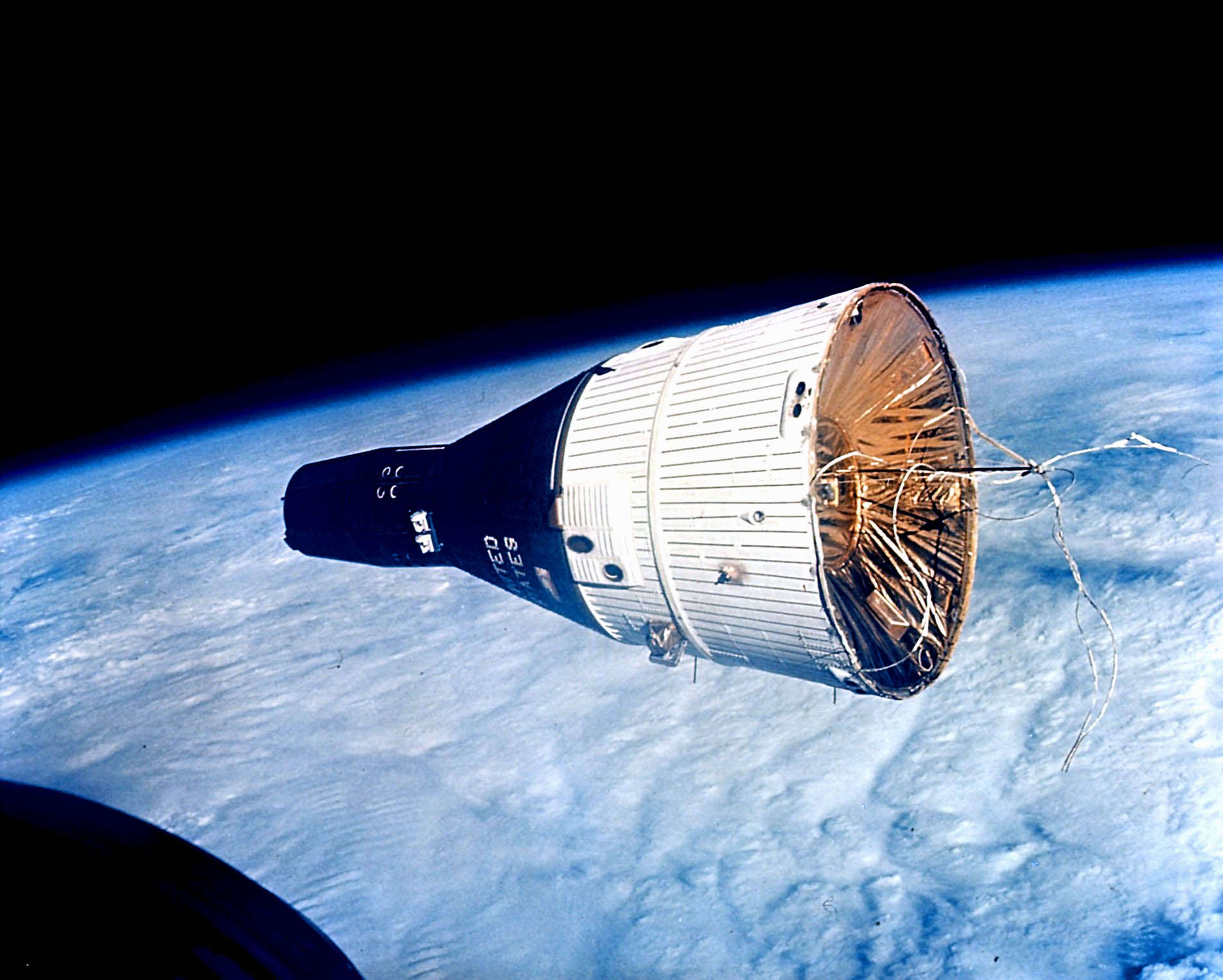
Gemini 7 in orbit

Gemini was the second American crewed orbital spaceflight program, after Mercury. It was intended to demonstrate technologies and techniques required for the Apollo program, such as extra-vehicular activities, rendezvous and docking, maneuvering in orbit and long duration flight.

The Gemini spacecraft, which was built by McDonnell Aircraft, was derived from the earlier Mercury spacecraft, but modified to accommodate two astronauts. It was also equipped with a larger equipment module, allowing it to support longer missions, and maneuver in orbit. It was launched by the Titan II rocket flying from Launch Complex 19 at the Cape Canaveral Air Force Station. In total, twelve missions were launched, ten of which were crewed. Following two uncrewed test flights, the first crewed flight, Gemini 3, was launched on 23 March 1965. The program concluded on 15 November 1966, with the successful recovery of Gemini 12.

Many other applications were envisaged for the Gemini spacecraft at various stages before, during, and after the two years in which it was used by NASA for crewed spaceflight. Although none of these proposals ever made it into operation, many were considered seriously, and in some cases flight hardware was constructed prior to cancellation. In the case of the Manned Orbital Laboratory, a Gemini spacecraft was launched on a suborbital demonstration flight in support of the program. In some cases technology developed in the Advanced Gemini program has been reintegrated into other programs, such as components from the Titan IIIM, which was to have launched MOL, being used to upgrade other Titan rockets.

== Military applications ==
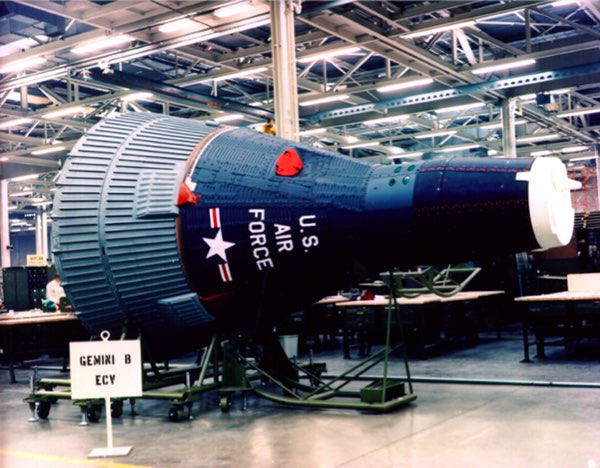
The Gemini B spacecraft

The United States Air Force intended to use the Gemini spacecraft to transport astronauts to its proposed space stations, the Manned Orbital Development System and later the Manned Orbital Laboratory (MOL). These stations would have been launched by Titan IIIM rockets, with a Gemini spacecraft atop, eliminating the need for rendezvous and docking maneuvers. For this purpose, several modifications were made to the Gemini capsule, including the installation of a hatch in the heat shield to allow access to the space station.

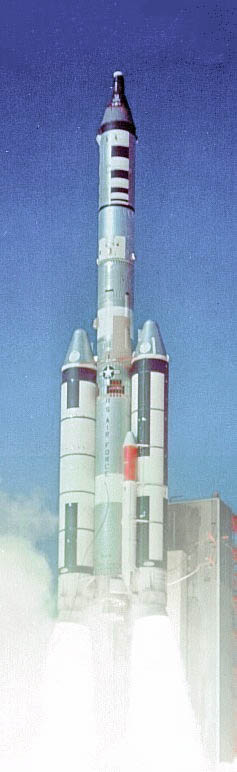
Launch of Gemini B and OPS 0855

In order to give its astronauts experience before these programs started, the Blue Gemini program was proposed, which would have seen USAF astronauts fly on NASA missions in order to practice various techniques required for their own missions. This would have first seen cooperative missions between NASA and the US Air Force, with two missions flying with mixed crews, followed by two missions with all-USAF crews, but performing missions for NASA. After these flights, the US Air Force would have flown a two-man Agena rendezvous and docking mission, followed by two one-man scientific or technology research missions. Other proposed missions included tests of the Astronaut Mobility Unit which was designed to assist with EVAs, inertial navigation systems, and flying a radar imaging system.

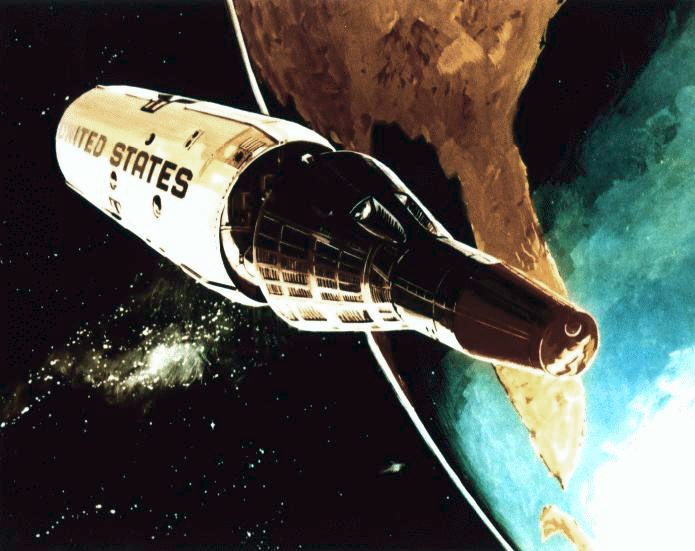
Gemini separating from MOL in orbit

MOL Launches would have been conducted from Launch Complex 40 at the Cape Canaveral Air Force Station, and Space Launch Complex 6 at Vandenberg Air Force Base. In 1966, a test flight was launched from LC-40, using a Titan IIIC. It consisted of the Gemini B spacecraft, built from the spacecraft used for the Gemini 2 test flight, atop OPS 0855, a boilerplate MOL space station. Gemini B was released on a suborbital trajectory, and descended to Earth to test modifications made to the heat shield, and ensure that the access hatch would not affect its performance. OPS 0855 continued on to orbit. Early MOL stations would have only been staffed by a single crew, launched with the station. Later stations would have been designed to be resupplied, and support multiple crews, delivered by additional Gemini spacecraft, or derivatives.

The MOL program was cancelled on 10 June 1969, in favor of uncrewed reconnaissance satellites. Some systems developed for the program were later used on uncrewed missions, while the space suits which were under development were transferred to NASA. The Titan IIIM rocket which was to launch MOL never flew, but some of the upgrades that were built into it were later used to upgrade other Titan rockets — the stretched first and second stages became the Titan 34, which was used as the core of some later Titan IIIB flights, and on the Titan 34D. The seven-segment solid rocket boosters were later introduced on the Titan IV-A.

== Gemini Ferry ==
Several Gemini Ferry spacecraft were proposed to provide transportation of crews and cargo to NASA and USAF space stations in low Earth orbit. NASA contracted McDonnell to conduct a study into what modifications would be needed to allow the Gemini spacecraft to support this. Three spacecraft were envisioned; a spacecraft to transport crew to the stations, a spacecraft with a cargo module for both crew and cargo delivery, and a dedicated uncrewed spacecraft to resupply the station every three or four months.

The studies looked at minimizing required modifications to the Gemini spacecraft. Three docking methods were considered. The first was use of the existing docking system used on Gemini-Agena missions. This would have allowed the mission to be accomplished with little modification to the Gemini spacecraft needed, however crew transfer could only have been accomplished by means of an extra-vehicular activity (EVA). Changes that would have been required included strengthening the nose, installing two solid rockets to be used for a separation burn, adding the necessary equipment to perform the transfer EVA, and providing provisions for flight to and from the station. The number of retro-rockets would have been increased from four to six. A second method would have seen the spacecraft dock in the same way, but after docking, the spacecraft would be swung round and attached to the side of the space station. A tunnel would then have been placed over the Gemini's hatches, allowing the crew to transfer to the station without performing an EVA. Some modifications to the hatches would have been required. The final proposed docking method was to use a port mounted on the rear of the equipment module, which would have allowed the crew to transfer directly between the spacecraft and space station, through the docking port.

A modified version of the spacecraft was proposed, which would have included a cargo module attached to the back of a modified equipment module. The spacecraft would have approached the station, and docked backwards using a port on the rear of the cargo module. If one of the forward docking configurations had been used for the Gemini itself, the docking would have been controlled remotely from the station, with the Gemini then separating from the cargo module and flying around the station to dock normally on a different port. The rear-docking Gemini would have simply remained attached to the cargo module, with the crew boarding the station through it. Its docking would have been controlled by its own crew, from a station at the back of the cargo module.

Two Gemini-derived spacecraft were considered for uncrewed resupply flights. The first of these would have involved a Gemini spacecraft, with all systems for crewed flight, re-entry and landing removed. The spacecraft would have docked using a port at the front of the spacecraft. Cargo would have been transferred through the nose of the spacecraft, where the re-entry attitude control system was located on the crewed spacecraft. The spacecraft was equipped with a liquid propellant engine to perform rendezvous, and to reboost the space station. The other proposal was for a new spacecraft to be built for uncrewed missions, but re-using as many Gemini systems as possible. It would have had a higher cargo capacity than the stripped-down version of the Gemini spacecraft.

Crew-only or cargo-only supply missions would have been launched aboard a Titan II, and the Saturn I or Saturn IB would have been used for the combined crew and cargo spacecraft. Because of the increased power of the Saturn I, the Gemini spacecraft's ejection seats would not have been able to propel the crew far enough in the event of an explosion, so a launch escape tower was proposed, based on the one used on the Mercury spacecraft. The Titan IIIM was also considered to launch the heavier spacecraft.

== Big Gemini ==
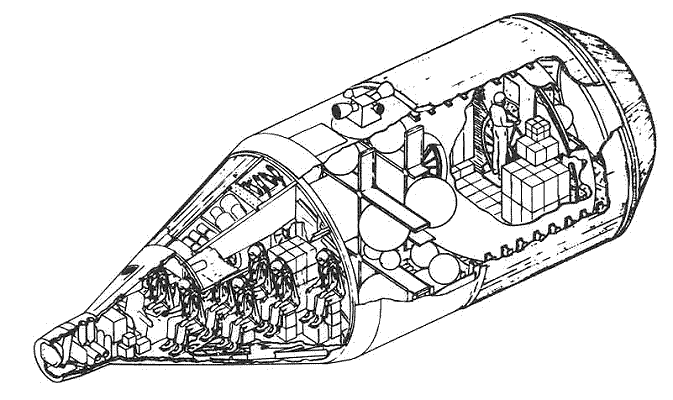
Big Gemini (Titan IIIG version)

Big Gemini, or Big G, grew out of a 1963 proposal called Gemini Transport, to develop an enlarged Gemini spacecraft with docking capability, which would take advantage of the increased capacity offered by the Saturn IB and Titan IIIM rockets. It was designed to transport between nine and twelve astronauts into space, and to be able to dock with space stations, in support of Apollo Applications and MOL missions. It would have been launched by a Heavy lift launch vehicle; either a Titan IIIG or Saturn INT-20, the former being intended for use on US Air Force missions and the latter being intended for NASA missions. The Titan IIIM was also considered, which would have launched a smaller version of the spacecraft due to its lower capacity, to resupply MOL space stations later in the program. NASA also proposed several Saturn IB derivatives with solid first stages as alternatives to the INT-20, offering similar payload capacity.

The shape and mass of the spacecraft would have varied depending on the rocket that was to launch it. The Saturn-launched version had a short, conical cargo module, and a total mass of 47,300 kilograms (104,300 lb) whereas the Titan IIIG-launched version featured a longer, cylindrical module, with a total mass of 59,000 kilograms (130,000 lb). The Titan IIIM version would have been much shorter and lighter, with a mass of 15,600 kilograms (34,400 lb), as that rocket had less payload capacity than the Titan IIIG or Saturn. The IIIG variant would have carried twelve crew, while the others had a maximum capacity of nine. Use of the NASA variant with the Apollo Service Module was also considered.

Once in orbit, Big G would have docked with space stations using an Apollo docking probe mounted on the rear of the cargo module, which was in turn mounted on the rear of the re-entry module. The re-entry module itself would have been enlarged to accommodate the larger crew, and the modifications made to the spacecraft for the MOL program would have been incorporated, including the hatch in the heat shield, which would have been used to provide access to the cargo module. In the event of a launch failure, the launch escape system developed for the Apollo spacecraft would have been used to propel the re-entry module clear of the rocket.

Big G would have made landings on land, using a parasail or paraglider to guide it onto a runway or dry lake, such as the one at Edwards Air Force Base. It would have landed using skids derived from the North American X-15.

== Lunar exploration ==
=== Circumlunar missions ===
The Gemini-Centaur proposal for circumlunar missions

Studies investigated sending a Gemini spacecraft onto a circumlunar trajectory. Many of the proposals made for this involved a double-launch architecture, with the Gemini spacecraft rendezvousing with an upper stage in orbit. Upper stages that were considered included the Transtage, the second stage of a Titan II, four different types of Centaur, including the S-V variant developed for the Saturn I, the Agena-D, an enlarged Agena, and two Agenas burning in parallel. Either a Titan or Saturn IB would have been used to launch the upper stage, while the Gemini would launch on the Titan II, as it had in the Gemini program.

Other proposals involved launching the Gemini spacecraft on a Titan IIIC, and refueling in low Earth orbit before proceeding to the Moon, and a single launch architecture using a three-stage variant of the Saturn IB.

The Gemini-Centaur proposal was predicted to have been able to achieve a 72-hour circumlunar flight. The Centaur would have performed trans-lunar injection, before separating from the Gemini spacecraft.

Some concerns were raised that the Gemini spacecraft's heat shield would not have been able to protect it during the higher speed ballistic reentry associated with the trajectory that would have been required. NASA proposed using a thicker heat shield and more insulation to protect the spacecraft. This and several other modifications made the spacecraft too heavy to be launched by the Titan II rocket which was used for the original twelve Gemini missions, so several solid rocket motors would have been added to allow this additional mass to be flown.

=== Lunar orbit missions ===
The Gemini spacecraft would have rendezvoused with stacked Centaur and Agena upper stages in low Earth orbit. The Centaur would have placed the Gemini and Agena onto a circumlunar trajectory, along which they would coast until they reached the Moon. The Agena would then have been used to perform Lunar orbit insertion. Following the completion of activities in Lunar orbit, the Agena would have been fired again for trans-Earth injection.

This architecture would have used a Titan II to launch the Gemini spacecraft, with a Saturn IB launching the upper stages.

=== Lunar landing ===
One of the early proposals for a lightweight one-man lander

Using the Gemini spacecraft for a crewed Lunar landing was considered as early as the original Mercury Mark II proposal which led to the Gemini program. The initial proposal was for a Lunar orbit rendezvous mission, using a Gemini spacecraft and a lightweight, open cockpit lander, launched by a Saturn C-3 rocket. It was the first time that Lunar orbit rendezvous was proposed as part of a lunar landing concept. The spacecraft would have been tested in Low Earth orbit before the Lunar missions, using two Titan II launches. The lander, which was designed by NASA's Langley Research Center, would have had a mass of no more than 4,372 kilograms (9,639 lb). Some of the proposals had a mass as low as 1,460 kilograms (3,220 lb), with cryogenic propellants being used in place of heavier hypergolic propellant. The proposal was intended to provide a faster and lower-cost alternative to the Apollo program, which was at that time proposing a direct ascent landing.

Another proposal would have used a Saturn V to achieve a direct ascent mission profile. The spacecraft consisted of four modules. The Retrograde Module would have been powered by an RL10 engine, and used to propel the spacecraft during the trans-lunar coast. During landing, it would be used for the initial phases of powered descent. At an altitude of 1,800 metres (5,900 ft) above the Lunar surface, the RM would have been jettisoned, and a second module, the Terminal Landing Module, would have performed the final descent. After landing, the spacecraft would have stayed on the Moon for a day, before it was propelled back to Earth. Launch from the Lunar Surface and trans-Earth injection would have been performed by the Service Module, which would also have contained components of the life support system, and other systems which were located in the Equipment Module of the Earth orbit Gemini spacecraft. The Reentry Module was based on the Gemini capsule, but would have been modified to allow it to reenter the atmosphere at the higher velocity that would have been required by a lunar flight. It was seen as the last effort by NASA managers and engineers who still advocated the direct ascent mission profile, and was intended to be cheaper, faster and safer than the Apollo lunar orbit rendezvous technique.

=== Apollo rescue ===
Due to the risks associated with the Lunar landing, several rescue spacecraft were proposed, to be used to allow the crew of an Apollo mission to return to Earth safely in the event of a problem. Many of these designs were based around the Gemini spacecraft.

One of these proposals was the Gemini Lunar Orbit Rescue Vehicle, which was designed to retrieve the crew of an Apollo spacecraft stranded in orbit around the Moon. It was to have used a stretched reentry module to accommodate the three astronauts who would have been aboard the Apollo. This would have been attached to a modified Equipment Module. The Equipment Module contained engines which would be used for Lunar orbit insertion and trans-Earth injection, as well as life support equipment to keep the crew alive until they returned to Earth. Launch and trans-Lunar injection would have been performed by a Saturn V. Once the spacecraft was in Lunar orbit, the Apollo crew would have boarded it by means of an EVA.

Another proposed spacecraft, the Gemini Lunar Surface Survival Shelter, was designed to be sent to the Moon ahead of an Apollo mission. It would have landed close to the planned Apollo landing site, and if the Apollo Lunar Module's ascent stage failed to ignite, the crew would have performed an EVA to transfer to the LSSS. The shelter was not designed to take off again after landing, so an LSRS or another Apollo mission would then be sent to collect the crew, while the Command Module Pilot of the original Apollo mission would have returned to Earth alone aboard his spacecraft. It consisted of a Gemini Reentry Module, which would have housed the astronauts while they awaited rescue, and a descent stage containing life support systems, consumables, and the engine and propellant used to land the spacecraft.

The Gemini Lunar Surface Rescue Spacecraft was intended to fly a direct ascent mission, launched by a Saturn V. Descent stages, built from either the descent stage of the Apollo Lunar Module, or from the Apollo Service Module, would have reduced the spacecraft's velocity as it approached the Moon. One configuration used two Service Modules and one LEM descent stage, with the LEM descent stage performing the final landing, and then being reused for ascent from the Lunar surface and trans-Earth injection. The other configuration used three LEM descent stages, with the second being used for landing and the third for ascent and TEI. The LSRS would have landed close to the Apollo Lunar Module on the Moon, and the Apollo crew would have transferred to it by EVA.

Following the Apollo 1 fire in January 1967, NASA conducted a safety review of the Apollo program. In response to this review, McDonnell proposed the Universal Lunar Rescue Vehicle, a repackaged version of the Lunar Surface Rescue Spacecraft with an enlarged capsule to make room for the three astronauts who were being rescued. It was intended to rescue an Apollo crew at almost any point while they were at the Moon, should an anomaly occur. Some ULRV designs included five seats, with two astronauts piloting it to the Moon. The proposal was considered, but rejected due to lack of funds.

== Other proposals ==
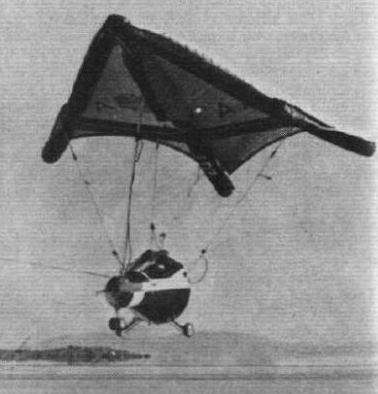
Gemini paraglider

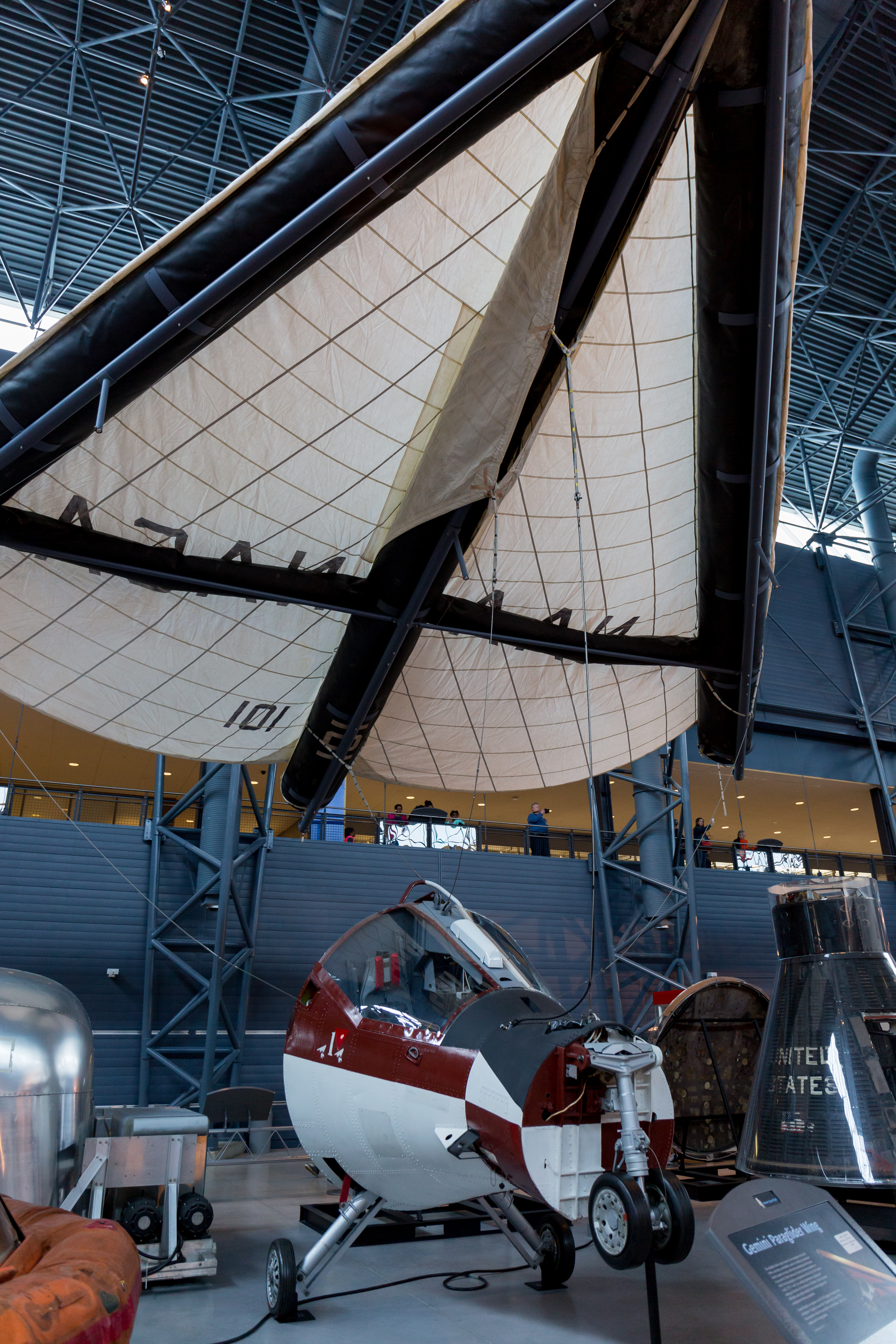
A Gemini paraglider at the Udvar-Hazy Center

=== Manned Orbital Telescope ===
The Manned Orbital Telescope was a proposal for a crewed spacecraft for astronomical or solar observation. It would have used the larger reentry module which was also proposed for the Big Gemini spacecraft, and would have been launched on a Saturn IB. The enlarged reentry module was also considered for a spacecraft proposed at the same time, which would have been used to rescue the crews of spacecraft that were stranded in low Earth orbit. It would have launched atop a Titan IIIC, once in orbit it would have maneuvered by means of a Transtage integrated into the equipment module. The larger capsule would have been used to accommodate the crew of the spacecraft which required rescue.

=== Rendezvous with a Pegasus satellite ===
Another proposed mission would have seen a Gemini spacecraft rendezvous with a Pegasus satellite in low Earth orbit. The spacecraft would have either been launched directly into an orbit to rendezvous with the Pegasus, or into a lower orbit, subsequently docking with an Agena, and using that to raise its orbit. The Gemini would have flown around the Pegasus, and then one of the crew would have performed an EVA to recover a piece of one of the spacecraft's micrometeoroid detection panels. This mission would have been used to prove that rendezvous could be accomplished with any spacecraft, to collect data on the satellite's exposure to micrometeoroids — supporting data that the satellite had returned itself, and to demonstrate technology for military flights to inspect hostile satellites.

=== Gemini Paraglider ===
Several missions were proposed to demonstrate methods of landing the Gemini spacecraft on land. The spacecraft had originally been designed to land using a flexible Rogallo wing and a set of skis or wheels, however this was abandoned in favor of splashdowns under parachutes due to delays in development and failures during testing. As the proposed Big Gemini spacecraft would have landed this way, McDonnell Aircraft asked NASA to consider flying standard Gemini spacecraft with the paraglider in order to test the system before it would be required operationally.

=== Winged Gemini ===
Another alternative landing concept was the US Air Force's proposal to attach wings to the spacecraft. This proposal arose soon after the cancellation of the X-20 Dyna-Soar, and would have seen a Gemini spacecraft attached to a set of wings developed during the ASSET program. This would have been launched by a Titan II rocket, and would have been unable to maneuver in orbit. Another proposal saw the spacecraft being launched by a Titan IIIA or IIIC, using the Transtage for maneuvering. Once the mission was complete, the spacecraft would have been deorbited by means of five solid rocket motors.

=== Long-duration missions ===
There were also proposals to use the Gemini spacecraft to conduct long-duration missions to small, purpose-built space stations in low-Earth orbit. One proposal saw a space station based on the Agena, which would have been used to provide propulsion and attitude control for the station. A pressurized module between the Agena and the docking adapter would have been used by the crew for accommodation and to conduct experiments. The crew would have boarded the Agena by means of an inflatable tunnel between the hatches and its airlock. The Pecan spacecraft was a similar proposal.

== See also ==
- Apollo Applications Program
- Apollo program
- DIRECT
- Skylab
- Soyuz program
