= Big Gemini =

Proposed advanced version of the Gemini spacecraft system

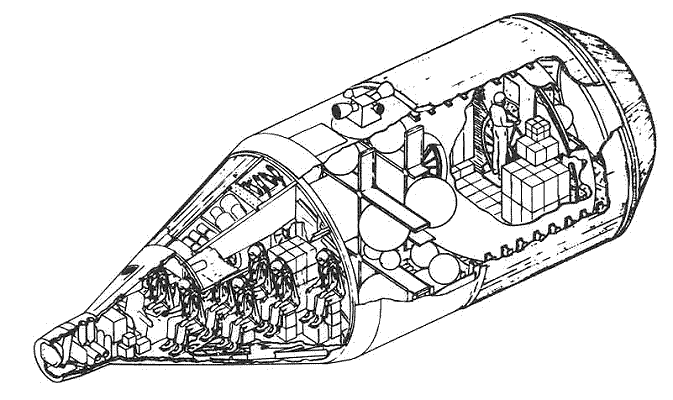
- Big Gemini spacecraft concept, August, 1969.
- Manufacturer: McDonnell Douglas
- Country of origin: United States
- Operator: NASA
- Applications: Logistic spacecraft derived from Gemini that would be used to resupply an orbiting space station

Specifications
- Spacecraft type: Space capsule
- Dry mass: 34,370 pounds (15,590 kg)
- Payload capacity: 5,500 pounds (2,500 kg)
- Crew capacity: 9 to 12
- Volume: 660 cubic feet (19 m^{3})

Dimensions
- Length: 38.00 feet (11.58 m)
- Diameter: 14.00 feet (4.27 m)

Production
- Status: cancelled

Related spacecraft
- Derived from: Gemini B

Big Gemini (or "Big G") was proposed to NASA by McDonnell Douglas in August 1969 as an advanced version of the Gemini spacecraft system (albeit actually having little in common). It was intended to provide large-capacity, all-purpose access to space, including missions that ultimately used Apollo or the Space Shuttle.

== Design ==
The study was performed to generate a preliminary definition of a logistic spacecraft derived from Gemini that would be used to resupply an orbiting space station. Land-landing at a preselected site and refurbishment and reuse were design requirements. Two baseline spacecraft were defined: a nine-man minimum modification version of the Gemini B called Min-Mod Big G and a 12-man advanced concept, having the same exterior geometry but with new, state-of-the-art subsystems, called Advanced Big G. Three launch vehicles-Saturn IB, Titan IIIM, and Saturn INT-20 (S-IC/S-IVB) were investigated for use with the spacecraft. The Saturn IB was discarded late in the study.

The spacecraft consisted of a crew module designed by extending the Gemini B exterior cone to a 419-cm-diameter heat shield and a cargo propulsion module. Recovery of the crew module would be effected by means of a gliding parachute (parawing). The parametric analysis and point design of the parawing were accomplished by Northrop-Ventura Company under a subcontract, and the contents of their final report were incorporated into the document. The landing attenuation of the spacecraft would be accomplished by a skid landing gear extended from the bottom of the crew module, allowing the crew to land in an upright position. The propulsion functions of transfer, rendezvous, attitude control, and retrograde would be performed by a single liquid propellant system, and launch escape would be provided by a large Apollo-type launch escape system.

In addition to the design analysis, operational support analysis and a program development plan were prepared.

The concept was given serious consideration. In 1971, faced with budget cuts which rendered the development of a fully-reusable space shuttle infeasible, NASA administrator George Low lamented that shuttle development might have to be delayed until the 1980s, with "something like a "big G" approach and a cheap space station" filling in as an interim. The Office of Management and Budget was much more favorable to the idea than NASA, concluding in a staff paper that Big Gemini launched aboard an uprated Titan III would be a more cost-effective option than any shuttle design. Ultimately OMB Deputy Director Caspar Weinberger helped to broker a compromise where Big G was taken off the table and NASA was given the greenlight for immediate development of a partially-reusable thrust-assisted orbiter shuttle.

== Specifications ==
- Crew size: 9 to 12
- Length: 11.5 m (38 ft)
- Maximum diameter: 4.27 m (14.0 ft)
- Habitable volume: 18.7 m^{3} (660 cu ft)
- Mass: 15,590 kg (34,370 lb)
- Payload: 2,500 kg (5,500 lb)
- Launch vehicles: Titan 3M, Saturn IB, Saturn S-IC/S-IVB.

== See also ==
- Advanced Gemini
- Blue Gemini
- Manned Orbital Laboratory
- TKS – Soviet heavy resupply spacecraft with a similar hatch-through-heatshield design
- Zarya – Soviet "Big Soyuz" design
