= Aerospace Research Institute =

Iranian research institute

Coordinates: 35.763°N 51.37831°E

- پژوهشگاه هوافضا
- Type: Public
- Established: 1999
- Location: Tehran, Iran
- Website: www.ari.ac.ir

The Aerospace Research Institute (ARI) (Persian: پژوهشگاه هوافضا) is a public advanced research institute founded in 1999 in Tehran, Iran.

This institute engages in scientific research in affiliation with the Iranian Space Research Center.

- Designing, manufacturing and launching four generations of space sounding rockets (eight sounding payloads)
- Manufacturing and testing the cold gas propulsion system
- Identification of standards used in the designing, manufacturing and testing of space equipment
- Designing and manufacturing the fixed flight simulator for the "Iran-140" airliner
- Codification of the national comprehensive document for aerospace development
- Designing and construction of the microgravity simulator
- Conceptual design of an orbiting spacecraft carrying the living organism
- Aerospace applications in environmental studies and environmental remote sensing

Furthermore, more than 500 completed and 156 ongoing research projects are being carried out currently, entitled:

- Designing, construction and testing the first generation of suborbital crewed spacecraft
- Telemetry conceptual design for the altitude of 250 km
- Designing, manufacturing and testing the recovery system for a 500 kg payload

== Establishment ==
The Aerospace Research Institute was established by the Ministry of Science, Research and Technology to conduct aerospace research. Since its establishment, the institute has been working to meet Iran's research needs in the field of aerospace and to establish effective connections with related industries.

== Objectives ==
The objectives of the Aerospace Research Institute are briefly as follows:

- Identifying and introducing aerospace technologies and cooperating with relevant organizations and institutions to achieve the latest research achievements in the field of aerospace
- Creating a suitable environment for promoting research activities in the field of aerospace
- Developing and expanding research in the field of aerospace and trying to meet Iran's research needs
- Research cooperation with educational and research institutions in the country in order to improve the quality of related research activities.

== Rename of the Institute ==
In 2010, with the approval of the Supreme Administrative Council, the status of the Iranian Space Organization was upgraded and it was transferred from the Ministry of Communications and Information Technology to the presidential institution. In accordance with the same approval, the Aerospace Research Institute also expanded significantly with the merger of the Agricultural Jihad Engineering Research Institute and the Iranian Space Research Institute. On the other hand, in 2012, the Higher Education Development Council of the Ministry of Science, Research and Technology of Iran approved the new statute of this research institute. Based on this approval, the research institute began operating under the new name of the Iranian Space Research Institute. The main part of the Aerospace Research Institute continued its activities under the name of the Astronautical Systems Research Institute with the mission of sending life into space in this merger.

After the Iranian Space Organization returned to the Ministry of Communications and Information Technology with the approval of the Supreme Administrative Council in February 2015, the Iranian Space Research Institute was also transferred to this ministry and the Astronautical Systems Research Institute returned to the Ministry of Science under the name of "Aerospace Research Institute".

== Location ==
The Aerospace Research Institute is located in Tehran Province, Shahrak Qods area.
