= Blue Gemini =

USAF project

Blue Gemini was a United States Air Force (USAF) project first proposed in August 1962 for a series of seven flights of Gemini spacecraft to enable the Air Force to gain crewed spaceflight experience prior to the launch of the Manned Orbital Development System, or MODS. The plan was to use off-the-shelf Gemini spacecraft.

It began as the Military Orbital Development System, created by the US Air Force Space Systems Division (SSD) in June 1962.

== History ==
Blue Gemini would consist of two National Aeronautics and Space Administration (NASA) missions which would include a USAF co-pilot and would accomplish NASA objectives. These would be followed by two more NASA missions that would have USAF crews. Those missions would be devoted to NASA goals, but would include USAF experiments if possible. The final phase of Blue Gemini would consist of three dedicated USAF missions. One of these would be an Agena Target Vehicle rendezvous mission. It was possible that some of these later missions would carry only a single crew member, the other seat being occupied by experimental equipment. Possible payloads included a Manned Maneuvering Unit that would allow an astronaut to maneuver around the spacecraft, an advanced navigation system, an erectable structure, and a large ground mapping radar. The plan was to end Blue Gemini missions approximately four months before the debut of the MODS space station.

Blue Gemini was canceled in January 1963 by Secretary of Defense Robert McNamara after he decided that military experiments could be carried aboard some NASA missions, i.e., Project Gemini. McNamara also canceled MODS at the same time. On 21 January 1963 McNamara and NASA Administrator James Webb agreed to create a Gemini Program Planning Board, "to avoid duplication of effort in the field of manned space flight and to insure maximum attainment of objectives of value to both the NASA and DOD."

In December 1963 McNamara approved the development of a Manned Orbital Laboratory (MOL) which was essentially a revived MODS. Blue Gemini should not be confused with the Gemini B spacecraft that was developed for MOL. Gemini B included a tunnel through its heat shield to enable the astronauts to reach the MOL spacecraft.

Because Blue Gemini was a paper project that was canceled before NASA started any Gemini flights, no Blue Gemini hardware was constructed. A test article on display at the National Museum of the United States Air Force at Wright-Patterson AFB, Ohio is the Gemini B spacecraft, recognized by its distinctive "US Air Force" written on the side, and the circular hatch cut through the heat shield.

== In fiction ==
The Blue Gemini trilogy of novels (Blue Gemini, Blue Darker Than Black, and Pale Blue) by Mike Jenne describe a fictional "Aerospace Support Project" which used a modified version of the Gemini spacecraft to execute military IIK (Intercept-Inspect-Kill) missions against Soviet satellites suspected of carrying nuclear weapons.
