= Sina-1 =

Iranian orbital satellite

- Mission type: Reconnaissance
- Operator: ISA
- COSPAR ID: 2005-043D
- SATCAT no.: 28893

Spacecraft properties
- Manufacturer: Production Corporation Polyot
- Launch mass: 170 kg

Start of mission
- Launch date: 27 October 2005, 06:52:26 UTC
- Rocket: Kosmos-3M
- Launch site: Plesetsk, Site 132/1
- Contractor: Yuzhnoye

Orbital parameters
- Reference system: Geocentric
- Regime: Low Earth
- Perigee altitude: 682 km
- Apogee altitude: 704 km
- Inclination: 98.18°
- Period: 98.62 minutes
- Epoch: 3 November 2005

Sina-1 (Persian: سینا ۱) is the first Iranian artificial satellite, launched at 6:52 UTC October 28, 2005 on board a Cosmos-3M Russian launch vehicle from the Plesetsk Cosmodrome. The rocket was also carrying a Russian military Mozhayets-5 satellite, a Chinese China-DMC, a British TopSat, a European Space Agency SSETI Express (Student Space Exploration and Technology Initiative-Express), a Norwegian nCube, a German UWE-1, and a Japanese XI-V. Sina-1's Satellite Catalog Number or USSPACECOM object number is 28893.

In 2003, then-Defense Minister Admiral Ali Shamkhani announced that Iran would launch its first satellite on a locally produced launch vehicle within eighteen months. The plan was to develop a booster based on the Shahab-3 medium-range ballistic missile.

When difficulties arose with indigenous booster development, the Iranian Institute of Applied Research turned to the Omsk-based Russian company Polyot. Polyot provided the launch services aboard the Kosmos-3M rocket and also built the satellite itself. The cost of the satellite was US$15 million.

== The satellite ==
The Iranian Space Agency had for many years said they were on the verge of sending their first satellite into orbit, finally leading to the launch of Sina-1, a satellite for telecommunications and Earth-imaging research purposes.

The miniaturized 170-kilogram reconnaissance satellite was put into a Sun-synchronous near-polar orbit and will image the surface with a 50 m (pan) with 50 km swath and 250 m resolution of MSS with 500 km swath resolution.

== The future ==
Iran had plans for the construction of five more Iranian satellites of which three were scheduled to be launched over the next three years. In July 2005, Iran's Deputy Telecom Minister Ahmad Talebzadeh said that Iran's next satellite, Mesbah, was ready for launch.

Mesbah, similar to Sina-1, was to be a reconnaissance satellite used to monitor natural phenomena in Iran's territory. This satellite would have most likely been launched on an indigenous rocket.

Iranian officials were originally going to use the then recently cancelled Shahab-4 missile to carry out the process of launching satellites into space. Instead, IRIS, an advanced model of the Ghadr-110 IRBM missile, was proposed for the launch.

In January 2005, Iran and a Russian firm sealed a $132 million deal to build a telecommunication satellite called Zohreh (Venus). The launch of Zohreh was planned within a few years; however, the project was cancelled due to multiple conflicts with the project's mission, between Russia and Italy.

== See also ==
- Al-Ta'ir
- Omid, Iranian satellite launched in February 2009 by an Iranian rocket Safir.
- Iranian Space Agency
- Safir

== Sources ==
- Iran's No Longer Moscow's Satellite - Kommersant
