= ISRC =

ISRC may refer to:

- International Standard Recording Code
- Iranian Space Research Center
