= End Human Trafficking Now =

International campaign against human trafficking

The End Human Trafficking Now (EHTN) campaign was founded in 2006 in an attempt at uniting the business world in combatting human trafficking and modern slavery. It is now defunct.

The campaign grew out of the “Roundtable of the Business Community against Human Trafficking”, a meeting held on 23 January 2006 in Athens, Greece, and organized under the auspices of the Greek Ministry of Foreign Affairs. The aim was to bring together business leaders and CEOs from the private sector, representatives of non-governmental organizations (NGOs), international organizations, and governments to share their expertise, find a common stance, and develop measures to counter human trafficking. The meeting was cosponsored by prominent international organizations in the fight against human trafficking: the International Organization for Migration (IOM), the United Nations Development Fund for Women (UNIFEM), the United Nations Office on Drugs and Crime (UNODC), the World Bank and the Geneva Centre for the Democratic Control of Armed Forces (DCAF). Notable attendants included Queen Sylvia of Sweden, Queen Sabika of Bahrain, former UN Secretary General Boutros Boutros-Ghali, Interpol Secretary General Ronald Noble and French composer Jean Michel Jarre.

From the gathering emerged a set of ethical principles against human trafficking, which became known as the Athens Ethical Principles. All signatories declare zero tolerance for dealing with businesses which benefit from human trafficking and promise to

1. Explicitly demonstrate the position of zero tolerance towards trafficking in human beings, especially women and children for sexual exploitation.
2. Contribute to prevention of trafficking in human beings including awareness-raising campaigns and education.
3. Develop a corporate strategy for an anti-trafficking policy which will permeate all our activities.
4. Ensure that our personnel fully comply with our anti-trafficking policy.
5. Encourage business partners, including suppliers, to apply ethical principles against human trafficking.
6. In an effort to increase enforcement it is necessary to call on governments to initiate a process of revision of laws and regulations that are directly or indirectly related to enhancing anti-trafficking policies.
7. Report and share information on best practices.

The first company to sign up to the principles was Manpower Inc., whose president of corporate affairs and government affairs was also the president of the board of EHTN.

As of 2012, over 12,500 corporations had signed the Principles.

== Past Board Members ==
President of the Board: David Arkless, President of Corporate Affairs & Government Affairs, ManpowerGroup
Executive Vice-President of the Board: Aleya El Bindari Hammad, Chair of the UN Voluntary Trust Fund for Victims of Trafficking in Persons, and UNODC Goodwill Advisor on Business Community Action against Human Trafficking

Board members in 2012:

- Charles C. Adams, Jr. Managing Partner, Akin Gump Hauer & Feld LLP
- Jeffrey Avina, Director of Citizenship &Community Affairs, Microsoft Middle East and Africa, Microsoft Inc.
- Anja Ebnöther, Assistant Director, Head Special Programs, Geneva Centre for the Democratic Control of Armed Forces
- Thérèse Gastaut, Visiting Lecturer on Global Governance, University Pantheon-Assas
- Taher Helmy, Partner, Baker & McKenzie
- Noeleen Heyzer, Under-Secretary-General of the United Nations, and Executive Secretary, United Nations Economic and Social Commission for Asia and the Pacific
- Anne-Marie Lizin, Chairperson, Foreign Relations and Defense Committee of the Belgian Senate
- Samih Sawiris, Chairman & CEO, Orascom Development Holding AG
- Walid Shash, Member of the Executive Management, Union Bancaire Privée
- Zohreh Tabatabai, Managing Partner, Quince Partners
- Auret van Heerden, President & CEO, Fair Labor Association
- Marianna Vardinoyannis, President, Marianna V. Vardinoyannis Foundation
