= Mohammad Ali Forghani =

- Born: 1957 (age 67–68); Yazd, Iran
- Occupation: Administrator of the Iranian Space Agency

Mohammad Ali Forghani (Persian: محمد علی فرقانی) is the administrator of the Iranian Space Agency. He is one of the deputies of the Ministry of Communication and Information Technology.

== Career ==
- Managing Director of Telecommunication Industries Co.
- Managing Director of electronics industries of Iran
- Member of Electronics Industries council
- Board member of Iran Electronic Development Co.
- Board member Fars Industrial Development Consortium

== Education ==
- Master's degree in System Management and productivity from Iran University of Science and Technology
- Ph.D. in Strategic Management
