= Student Space Exploration & Technology Initiative =

The Student Space Exploration & Technology Initiative (SSETI) is a unique project put into execution by students from different universities spread over European countries. In collaboration with space industry they aim to build microsatellites together.

Most universities do not have capabilities to build their own complete satellite. The SSETI aims to combine different academic capabilities to realise pan-European student missions. Space projects, which are beyond the local existing capabilities, will be made possible through the fragmentation and redistribution of many small, locally achievable tasks. Ambitious projects, such as a lunar lander, may be realised by this distributed development.

== SWARM ==
SWARM is the youngest project in line. SWARM will be developed consisting by a nanosatellite releasing femtosatellites into low Earth orbit from where scientific and/or technical experiments will be conducted.

== ESEO ==
The ESEO (European Student Earth Orbiter) project was started as part of the SSETI project family, in collaboration with the European Space Agency who ran the project independently from SSETI. ESEO was launched from Vandenberg AFB on 3 December 2018 as a part of Spaceflight's SmallSat Express and was expected to function for 6 to 18 months.

The Mission Control Center was located in Forlì (Italy).

The ESEO project concluded in December 2020, after operating for two years.

== ESMO ==
The ESMO (European Student Moon Orbiter) project was started as part of the SSETI project family, in collaboration with the European Space Agency who now run the project independently from SSETI.

== See also ==
- Mozhayets-5
- ESA
- SSETI Express Satellite
- SEDS
