= Iranian Space Agency =

Iran's governmental space agency

Iranian Space Agency (ISA)
- Official logo of ISA

Agency overview
- Abbreviation: ISA
- Formed: 1 February 2004; 22 years ago
- Type: Space agency
- Headquarters: Tehran, Mahdasht, Semnan, Shahrud, Qom
- Administrator: Hassan Salarieh
- Primary spaceport: Imam Khomeini Spaceport
- Owner: Ministry of Information and Communications Technology of Iran
- Annual budget: ~$222 million (2024)
- Website: www.isa.ir

The Iranian Space Agency (ISA, Persian: (سافا) سازمان فضایی ایران Sāzmān-e Fazāi-ye Irān) is Iran's governmental space agency. The Iranian Space Research Center and Iranian Space Agency are the main organizations carrying space research and operations in Iran. Iran became an orbital-launch-capable nation in 2009. Iran is one of the 24 founding members of the United Nations Committee on the Peaceful Uses of Outer Space (COPUOS), which was established on 13 December 1958.

== History ==
The history of the space industry in Iran dates back to the late 1940s and early 1950s. Iran first joined the ranks of space technology users in 1960 by becoming a member of the International Satellite Communications Organization and installing and using a standard A antenna in Asadabad, Hamedan.

In 1974, following the launch of the first US Earth Resources Survey satellite, which was later renamed the Landsat series, the Satellite Data Collection Office was established to enable the use of satellite data in the then Planning and Budget Organization, and the use of remote sensing technology began in this office. After initial research and obtaining favorable results from satellite images and with the aim of direct access to satellite images, the office was renamed the "Iranian Remote Sensing Center", and thus, the foundation for a national space institution was laid in Iran in the early 1970s.

In 1976, the "Iran Remote Sensing Center" purchased and installed satellite image receiving stations in Mahdasht, Karaj, as part of the "Satellite Use Plan" to directly receive satellite information and process, duplicate, and distribute data. The following systems were planned for the aforementioned station:

1. Information tracking and receiving system
2. Information processing and correction system
3. Information interpretation system
4. Information management system
5. Information duplicating and printing system

In 1991, according to a single article approved by the Islamic Consultative Assembly, the "Iranian Remote Sensing Center" was transferred to the Ministry of Posts, Telegraphs, and Telephones as a state-owned company. Subsequently, to comply with the country's Supreme Space Council approvals, all governance activities of the center were transferred to the Iranian Space Organization.

ISA was established on 28 February 2004, according to Article 9 of the Law for Tasks and Authorizations of the Ministry of Communications and Information Technology passed on 10 December 2003 by the Parliament of Iran. Based on the approved statute, ISA is mandated to cover and support all the activities in Iran concerning the peaceful applications of space science and technology under the leadership of a Supreme Council of Space chaired by the President of Iran.

The council's main goals included policy making for the application of space technologies aiming peaceful uses of outer space, manufacturing, launching and use of the national research satellites, approving the space related state and private sector programs, promoting the partnership of the private and cooperative sectors in efficient uses of space, identifying guidelines concerning the regional and international cooperation in space issues.

To follow and implement the strategies set by the council, ISA, affiliated with the Ministry of Communication and Information Technology in the form of an autonomous organization, was organized. The president of ISA held the positions of Vice-Minister of Communications and Information Technology and Secretary of the Supreme Council of Space simultaneously.

In 2015, Iran's space program was quietly suspended by President Rouhani following international pressures. It has then been reinvigorated by President Raisi in 2021.

== Budget ==
The proposed budget for the Iranian year 1393 (2014–2015) was 1,865,583 million rials (US$71,753,192). Other related organizations have received separate budget allocations. Iranian Space Research Center has received an additional 1,751,000 million rials (US$67,346,100) of budget for the year 1393.

The budget for the year 2008 was mentioned to be US$3.9 billion (2008). However, it was not apparent whether the allocation was just for one year or a longer period.

Under President Hassan Rouhani, the proposed 2017 budget for the Iranian Space Agency fell to a low of US$4.6 million.

== Satellite launch vehicle (SLV) ==
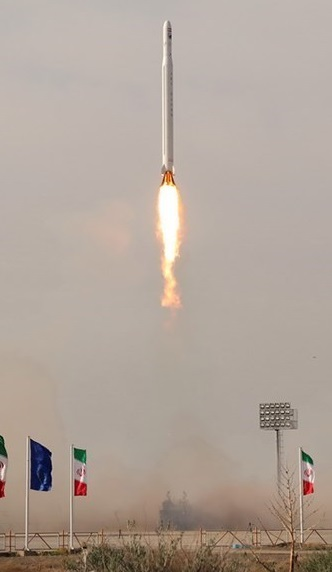
Noor satellite launch

=== Safir SLV ===
Iran has developed an expendable satellite launch vehicle named Safir SLV. Measuring 22 m in height with a core diameter of 1.25 m, with two liquid propellant stages, a single thrust chambered first stage and a two-thrust chambered, step-throttled second stage, the SLV has a lift off mass exceeding 26 tons. The first stage consists of a lengthened up-rated Shahab-3C. According to the technical documentation presented in the annual meeting of the United Nations Office for Outer Space Affairs, it is a two-stage rocket with all liquid propellant engines. The first stage is capable of carrying the payload to the maximum altitude of 68 kilometres.

The Safir-1B is the second generation of Safir SLV and can carry a satellite weighing 60 kg into an elliptical orbit of 300 to 450 km. The thrust of the Safir-1B rocket engine has been increased from 32 to 37 tons.

=== Simorgh SLV ===
In 2010, a more powerful rocket named Simorgh was built. Its mission is to carry heavier satellites into orbit. The Simorgh rocket is 27 meters (89 feet) long, and has a mass of 77 tonnes (85 tons). Its first stage is powered by four main engines, each generating up to 29,000 kilograms (64,000 pounds) of thrust, plus a fifth which will be used for attitude control, which provides an additional 13,600 kilograms (30,000 pounds). At liftoff, these engines will generate a total of 130,000 kilograms (290,000 pounds) of thrust. Simorgh is capable of putting a 350-kilogram (770 lb) payload into a 500-kilometer (310-mile) low Earth orbit. In 2015, Israeli media reported that the missile is capable of taking a crewed spacecraft or satellite into space. The first flight of the Simorgh rocket occurred on 19 April 2016.

=== Zuljanah SLV ===
On 1 February 2021, Iran said it successfully tested its latest satellite launch vehicle named "Zuljanah" which is capable of carrying satellites weighing up to 220 kg into a 500 km orbit. The SLV has three stages and is equipped with 2 solid fuel engine stages and a last liquid fuel stage, with the first and second stages having 75 tons of thrust each.

=== Qoqnoos SLV ===
On 2 February 2013, the head of the Iranian Space Agency, Hamid Fazeli mentioned that the new satellite launch vehicle, Qoqnoos will be used after the Simorgh SLV for heavier payloads.

=== Soroush 1 & 2 SLV ===
ISA has plans to build SLVs (named "Soroush" 1 & 2) in the future with a capacity to place 8 tons and 15 tons payloads in space (i.e. 200 km orbit) respectively.

== Launch history ==
=== Orbital launches ===
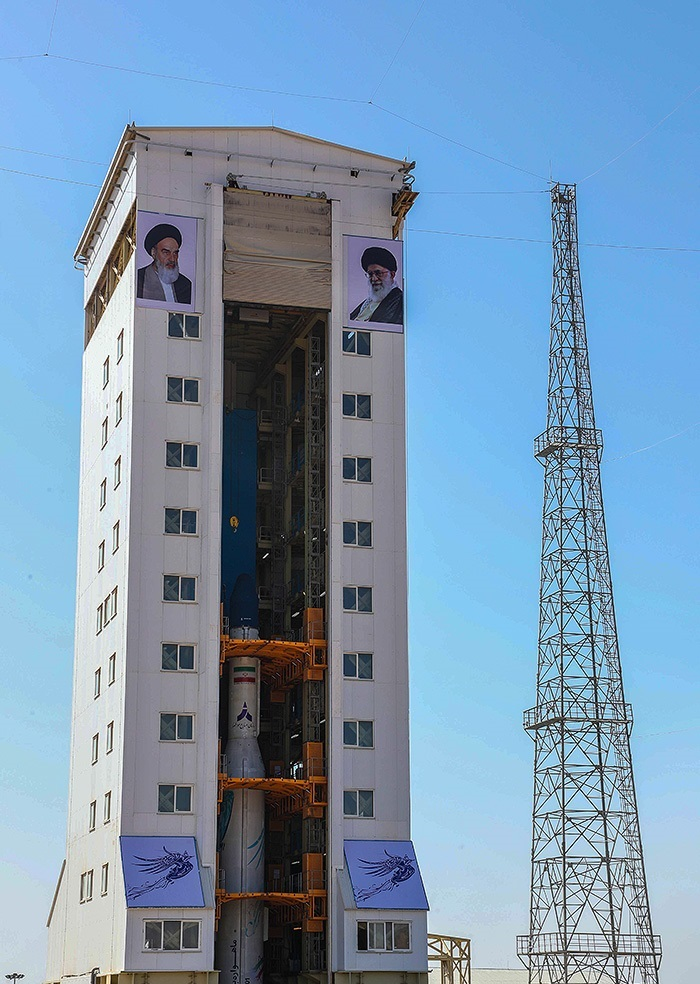
The Simorgh SLV in its servicing tower.

On 17 August 2008, Iran proceeded with the second test launch of a two-stage Safir SLV from a site south of Semnan city in the northern part of the Dasht-e-Kavir desert. Reza Taghizadeh, head of the Iranian Aerospace Organization, told state television "The Safir (Ambassador) satellite carrier was launched today and, for the first time, we successfully launched a dummy satellite into orbit".

On 2 February 2009, Iranian state television reported that Iran's first domestically made satellite Omid (Persian: امید, meaning "Hope") had been successfully launched into Low Earth orbit by Iran's Safir rocket and therefore Iran became the 9th country to put a domestically built satellite into orbit. The operation was made to coincide with the 30th anniversary of the Iranian Revolution.

In February 2011, Iranian president Mahmoud Ahmadinejad announced that there will be many launches of indigenously produced orbiters in 2011–2012 period.

Iran plans to send one-ton satellites into an orbit of 1000 km and is setting up a new launch base for this purpose. Iran is also planning to launch satellites into orbits up to 36,000 km by 2027.

=== Sub-orbital launches ===
On 25 February 2007, the Iranian state-run television announced that a rocket, created by the ministries of science and defense and which carried an unspecified cargo, was successfully launched. This could have been the maiden test flight of the three staged Safir SLV which ended in a failure. Later on it was noted by Iranian President Mahmoud Ahmadinejad that the failure was due to a technical problem in the last stage of the rocket.

On 4 February 2008, Iran successfully launched a two-stage all solid-fuel sub-orbital sounding rocket Kavoshgar-1 (Explorer-1), for a maiden sub-orbital test flight from Shahroud, its newly inaugurated domestic space launch complex. The first stage of the rocket detached after 90 seconds and returned to Earth with the help of a parachute while the second stage reached a 200 km altitude before reentering the Earth's atmosphere after 300 seconds. The third section of the rocket, containing an atmospheric probe, climbed to 250 km while successfully transmitting scientific data on the atmosphere and the electromagnetic waves on its path back to Earth. It deployed a parachute after six minutes at a lower altitude.

The second Kavoshgar (Kavoshgar-2), which carried a space-lab and a restoration system, was launched in November 2008.

In 2016, 2017, 2019, and 2020, Iran launched a sub-orbital satellite on Simorgh, and in 2021 and 2022, it launched a satellite on Zuljanah, both of which were successful.

==== Animals in space ====
Iran is the 6th country to send animals in space.

- On 3 February 2010, ISA launched a Kavoshgar-3 (Explorer-3) rocket with one rodent, two turtles, and several worms into sub-orbital space and returned them to Earth alive. The rocket was enabled to transfer electronic data and live footage back to Earth. The Iranian Aerospace Organization (IAO) showed live video transmission of mini-environmental lab to enable further studies on the biological capsule. This was the first biological payload launched by Iran. Iran is the sixth country to send animals in space.
- On 15 March 2011, the ISA launched the Kavoshgar-4 (Explorer-4) rocket carrying a test capsule designed to carry a monkey but without living creatures on board.
- Kavoshgar-5 (Explorer-5) carrying a live monkey was launched for a 20-minute sub-orbital flight in September 2011, however the mission failed. On 3 October 2011, Iran indefinitely postponed further plans while scientists reviewed readiness for future missions. In May 2012, Iran announced that it would send more living creatures into the space by the summer. Following the last failed attempt, ISA was seeking to successfully send a monkey into space by 2013. ISA head Hamid Fazeli told the Iranian news agency Mehr that the designated monkeys are currently in quarantine.
- On 29 January 2013, Iranian state media announced that a monkey was sent into space and returned safely aboard the Pishgam capsule, after having reached a height of 120 km. This was the first time that Iran has sent a primate into space, 54 years after the first monkeys Able and Baker returned safely. No details on the timing or location of the launch were given.
- On 14 December 2013, Iran launched a second monkey, named Fargam, on a suborbital flight. The monkey is reported to have been retrieved successfully and safe, after the short 15-minute flight.
- On 6 December 2023, Iran launched its 500-kilogram (1,000-pound) bio-space capsule to 130 kilometres (80 miles) from Earth's surface using Salman launcher. It was a test for space technologies in the areas of launch, recovery, and speed control systems, as well as impact shields, capsule aerodynamic design, and the systems related to control and monitoring of biological conditions.

== Satellites ==
Iran is the 9th country to put a domestically built satellite into orbit using its own launcher.

=== Launched satellites ===
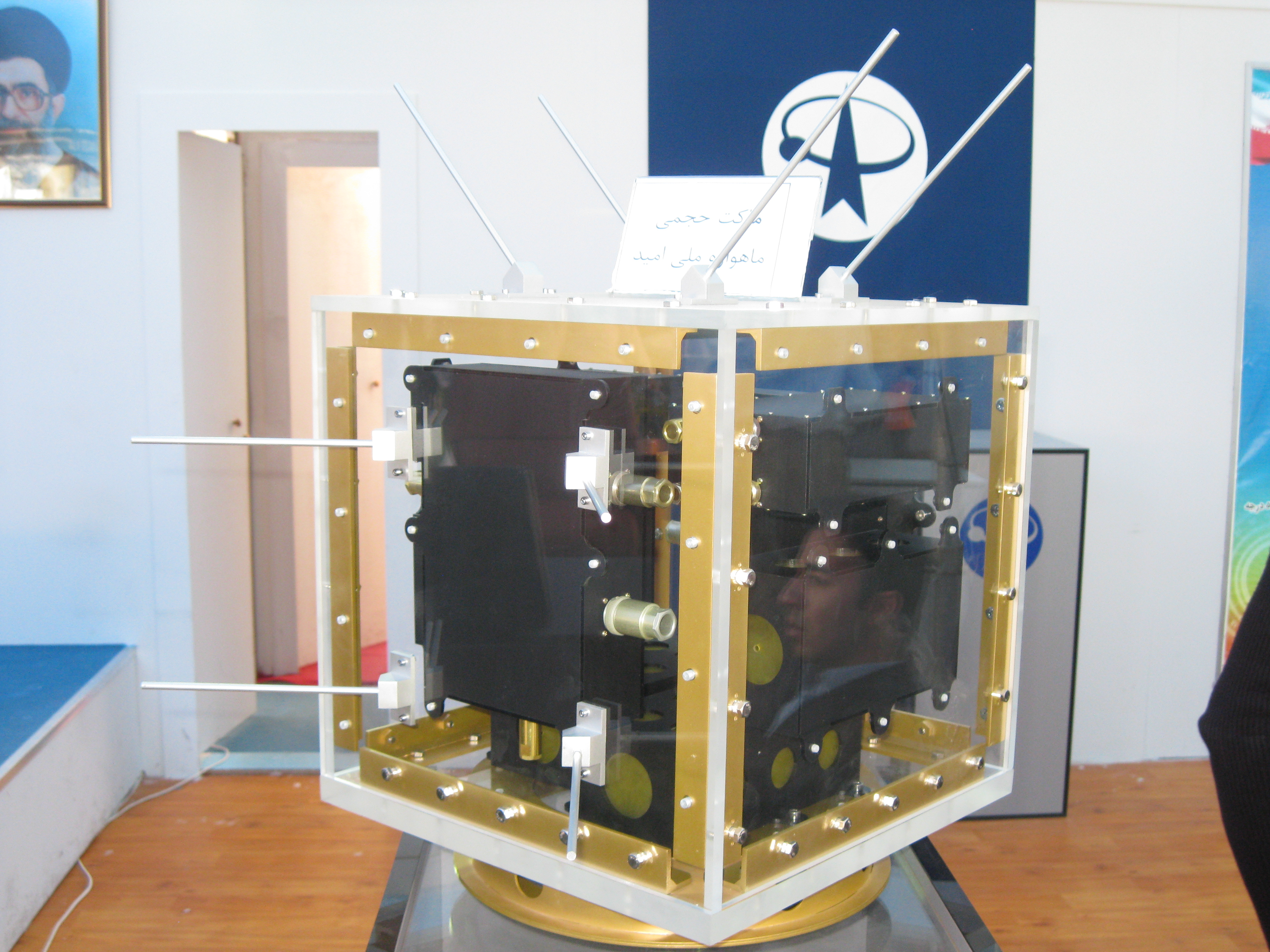
Omid, Iran's first satellite placed into orbit with own launcher.

- On 28 October 2005, a Kosmos-3M booster rocket launched Sina-1. The joint Iranian-Russian Sina-1 project cost US$15 million, and the launch made Iran the 43rd country to possess its own satellite.
- Huanjing (Environment) 1, a joint research satellite of Iran, China and Thailand was launched on a Chinese Long March 2C carrier rocket on 6 September 2008, aimed at boosting cooperation on natural disasters such as flooding, drought, typhoon, landslide and earthquake. The twin Earth observation satellites of eight planned were launched from Taiyuan SLC. The satellites will work as a constellation with six other satellites yet to be launched. Its observational footprint is 720 km. With a lifespan of more than three years, they have state-of-the-art imaging systems and infrared cameras and provide a global scan every two days. Iran had shouldered US$6.5 million out of the $44 million of the total project cost.
- Omid, Iran's first satellite placed into orbit in February 2009 using a domestic launcher, the Safir. Omid was described as a data-processing satellite for research and telecommunications.
- Rasad-1 is an imaging satellite that has been built and launched successfully by Iran. The satellite was sent into the 260 kilometres orbit by a Safir rocket launcher on 15 June 2011. It beams back to earth pictures with 150-meter resolution. It decayed from orbit three weeks after launch, on 6 July 2011.
- Navid-e Elm-o Sanat (also known as 'Ya Mahdi') which is an "experimental satellite" built by students for testing camera and telecommunications equipment was revealed to the public on 3 February 2010. It has store-dump capability and a resolution of 400 meters. On 3 February 2012, Iranian press reported that Iran has successfully launched its domestically built Navid-e Elm-o Sanat satellite into orbit. The satellite remained in orbit for two months, before reentering the atmosphere on 1 April 2012.
- Fajr, is an imaging satellite which also carries an experimental locally made GPS system built by Iran Electronics Industries. The satellite had a life span of 1.5 years and an imaging resolution of 500 meters. It is the first Iranian satellite to use "cold gas thruster" and has solar panels. Originally, it was to be launched in 2012. Allegedly, non-announced by Iran of a failed launch of Fajr satellite occurred on 23 May in 2012. Finally, Fajr was successfully launched and placed into orbit on 2 February 2015. On 26 February 2015, Fajr reentered Earth's atmosphere after 23.8 days in orbit.
- Toloo is the first satellite of the new generation of detector satellites built by Iran's electronics industry with SIGINT capability. It was launched from the Imam Khomeini launch base with a satellite on "Simorgh", but it was not successfully launched and did not enter the orbit.
- Dousti, satellite designed for Earth observation. Launched by a Safir rocket on 5 February 2019. The launch failed.
- Payam (formerly AUT-SAT), is a microsatellite being developed by students of Amirkabir University of Technology. It is designed as a remote sensing satellite with store-dump capability. It was launched on 15 January 2019 by a Simorgh rocket, but failed to reach orbit. Amir Kabir satellite, weighing 80 kg, will reportedly be placed in a Sun-synchronous orbit of 660 km in radius, and will remain in space between three and five years. The launcher is expected to be a Simorgh rocket.
- On 9 February 2020, Iran successfully launched the communication satellite, Zafar 1, through a Simorgh rocket from Imam Khomeini Space Center at 19:15 local time. However, spokesman for the defence ministry's space programme, Ahmad Hosseini, notified that the satellite didn't reach the required speed in its final moments for being put in the orbit.
- On 22 April 2020, Iran successfully launched "Noor" (Farsi for "Light"), a military satellite, into a 426 x 444 km / 59.8° orbit.
- On 31 December 2021, Iran launched a Simorgh rocket carrying "three research cargos into space". However, following the launch, a defence ministry spokesman, Ahmad Hosseini, confirmed the mission had failed to put its three payloads into orbit after the rocket was unable to reach the required speed. France described the launch as "regrettable" as it was conducted amid renegotiations of the Joint Comprehensive Plan of Action.
- On 8 March 2022, Iran reportedly sent its second “Noor-2” military satellite into 500 km orbit.
- The Khayyam, a high resolution imaging satellite, was successfully launched into orbit by a Russian Soyuz rocket on 9 August 2022.
- Nahid-1 launched on board a Qaem 100 on 4 March 2023 as part of the rocket's maiden flight, however the launch failed and the satellite was destroyed together with the rocket.
- Noor-3, also called Najm is the third satellite of the Noor class, was launched on a Qassed launcher on 27 September 2023 to a 450 kilometre orbit. It has a weight of 24 kg with a resolution of 6 to 4.8 meters.
- The Soraya satellite is a remote sensing satellite and one of the SRI research satellite series built by the Iranian Space Research Institute, which was built by the Iranian Space Organization and was sent to the near-Earth orbit on January 20, 2024, by the Iranian Qaim 100 satellite launcher. First successful orbital flight. Satellite placed into 750 km orbit breaking Iran's previous record.
- On 28 January 2024, three Iranian satellites, Mehda, Kayhan 2 and Hatef 1, were launched with a Simorgh rocket and placed in a 450 km orbit. This was the first time that an Iranian satellite carrier carried more than one satellite and successfully put it into orbit.
- On 29 February 2024, Russia launched an Iranian research satellite that scans Iran's topography from a 500 km (310 mi) orbit. The remote sensing satellite Pars 1, which was launched by a Russian Soyuz rocket from the Vostochny space base, weighs 134 kg and is equipped with three cameras.
- On September 14, 2024, Chamran-1 was launched using the Qaim-100 carrier, the Chamran-1 research satellite was built by Iran Electronic Industries and weighed 60 kg (132 lb) and was successfully launched and placed into orbit.
- On July 25, 2025, Russia's Soyuz-2-1b rocket launched iran's domestically built Nahid-2 telecomms satellite from a cosmodrome into space. Nahid-2 was deployed into 500-kilometer orbit, designed to last up to 2-5 years. Built by Irans Space Agency, weighing 110kg with 3-axis control system, and a propulsion system for orbital control.
- On 28 December 2025, Russia launched three Iranian-built satellites into low Earth orbit on a Soyuz rocket from the Vostochny Cosmodrome. The satellites, reportedly including Zafar-2, Kowsar, and Paya, were developed by Iranian institutions and launched into orbit as part of expanding scientific and technological cooperation between Iran and Russia. According to international media reports, these satellites are intended for civilian purposes, such as Earth observation, environmental monitoring, and communications research. The launch successfully placed multiple Iranian satellites into orbit during a single mission using a foreign launch provider.

=== Unlaunched satellites ===
- Nasir 1, Iran's indigenously designed satellite navigation system (SAT NAV) has been manufactured to find the precise locations of satellites moving in orbit.
- Sharif satellite was originally scheduled for launch in 2012 is an observation satellite with an imaging resolution of better than 12.5 meters. The satellite is manufactured by Sharif University of Technology.
- Mesbah (meaning 'Lantern') was to be built by Iran in collaboration with Italy's Carlo Gavazzi Space S.p.A. Mesbah was a Low Earth orbit telecommunication satellite. The satellite was never launched as both Russia and Italy refused to cooperate with Iran anymore on space projects. The original Mesbah project was later on replaced by indigenous Mesbah-2 which is to be built and launched by Iran alone. It was reported, in April 2011, that the US$10 million satellite built in Italy, has not been delivered to Iran. Italy has refused to hand over the satellite to Iran under the pretext of international sanctions on Iran. Iran maintains that the satellite be handed over for its launch by an Iranian satellite carrier.
- Mesbah-2 is a limited application communication satellite which was conceived as a locally designed satellite after the original Mesbah project failed to materialize due to international pressures on Iran. It will have a life span of 3 years with store dump capability and its own navigation system. It is scheduled for launch in 2012.
- Qaem, is a geosynchronous communication satellite that is being developed by Iran and is scheduled to be launched on an Iranian carrier by 2016. The satellite is going to have a life expectancy of 15 years, broadcasting TV and Radio channels.
- Pars Sepehr, is a remote sensing satellite being built and to be launched from Iran. Its launch date is not yet confirmed.
- Pars-2, is a remote sensing satellite being built and to be launched from Iran. Its launch schedule has not yet been announced.
- ZS4 is an Iranian satellite to be launched by an Iranian launcher. Its mission role and launch date have not been revealed.
- Sina-2 is a small satellite that will replace the mission role of Sina-1.
- SM2S is an Iranian satellite to be launched by an Iranian launcher. Its mission role and launch date have not been revealed.
- Iran is also to implement 10 satellite projects with Asia-Pacific Space Cooperation Organization (APSCO) members. The organization has defined 10 projects on designing, building and launching light satellites, middle class satellites weighing 500–600 kg, research satellites, remote-sensing and telecommunications satellites.
- Besharat satellite is being built by Iran with collaboration of some OIC members which have volunteered in the project. It is to be launched by Iran. The countries which are jointly working with Iran on the project are Pakistan, Turkey, Malaysia and some Arab countries. Its launch date is not yet confirmed.
- Saar (Starling) will be produced by Iran's Khajeh Nasir Toosi University of Technology.
- Zohreh, is a geosynchronous communication satellite which was originally proposed before the Revolution in the 1970s as part of a joint Indian-Iranian project of four Iranian satellites to be launched by the then upcoming NASA Space Shuttles. Iran had also negotiated with France to build and launch the satellites but the project never materialized. In 2005, Iran negotiated with Russia to build and launch the first Zohreh satellite under an agreement worth $132 million with the satellite launch date stipulated as 2007–2008. The new agreement had followed the earlier failed negotiations with Russia in 2003 when Russia cancelled the project under US pressures. The satellite was to be of Express-1000 type and capable of relaying telephone, fax, data and television signals with a life span of 15 years. In September 2010, Iran announced that it will build and launch the satellite locally as the foreign contractors had refused to complete the project. New launch date for the satellite was announced as 2014. Russia had announced in 2009 that it is not going to cooperate with Iran on any space projects but reversed course again following the lifting of international sanctions against Iran in 2015. Iran has also solicited NASA's cooperation in future space projects.
- Ekvator, a geosynchronous communications satellite built by ISS Reshetnev for Iran in a continuation of previous Russia-Iran space cooperation efforts. As of October 2022, Ekvator is expected to be launched on a Proton-M rocket in early 2024.
- Two satellites, Kausar and Hodhod, will be launched by a Russian launcher. The launch time of these two sensing and telecommunication satellites has been announced in early 2024.
- Toloo 3 satellite is Iran's first miniature satellite, capable of taking black-and-white photos with a 5-meter spatial resolution and colored photos with a 10-meter resolution. It is scheduled to be launched in the middle of March 2024.
- Nahid-2, built by the Iranian Space Research Center, is a communications satellite with a minimum lifespan of two years and will also be positioned in a 500-kilometre orbit above the earth, it is scheduled to launch in mid-2024.
- Zafar-2 are Iranian microsatellites with the mission to take high resolution wall maps and aerial photos of locations around the globe, the plan is to launch the satellite in May or June 2020, but has since been delayed.

== Space centers ==
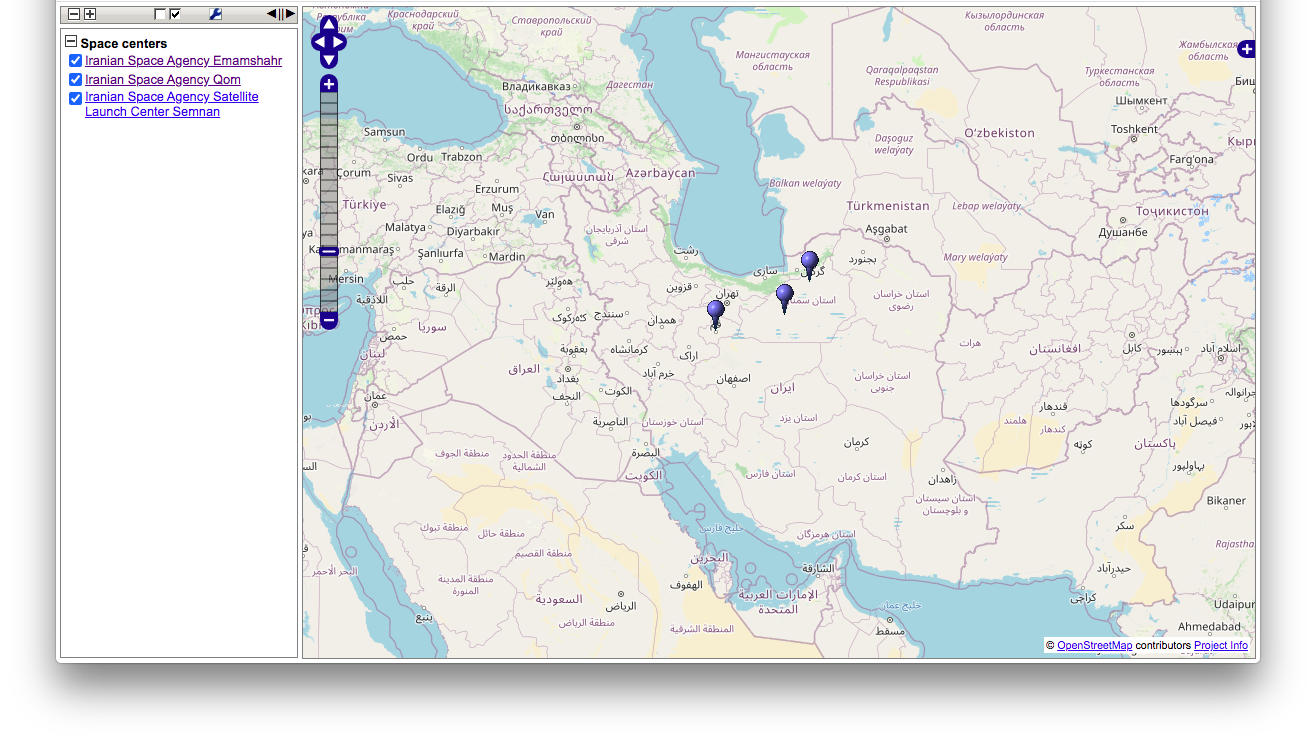
Map of locations of significant facilities of the Iranian Space Agency

The main launch site of the Iranian Space Agency is Shahrud, located at 36°25′0″N 55°01′0″E, where suborbital Shahab 3s LV have been launched.

Qom, located at 34°39′0″N 50°54′0″E, is the other launch site.

On occasion of the inaugural launch of Iran's first Safir-class sub-orbital rocket called Kavoshgar-1 (Explorer-1), Iran unveiled on 4 February 2008, its first Satellite Launch Center 35.234°N 53.921°E in Semnan city. The facility includes an underground command and control center, a tracking station and a launchpad among other structures.

In December 2010, it was announced that due to geographical limitations of first space center in injecting satellite into orbit, studies have been carried out for setting up a second (satellite) launch pad. The new national spaceport of Iran, named after Imam Khomeini, is being built in Semnan.

This new port is to be used to launch all future Iranian space missions similar to American Kennedy Space Center or the Baikonur Cosmodrome. In March 2011, Jane's Information Group reported on the basis of its satellite imagery analysis of Iranian space launch sites that Iran is aggressively building complex facilities with very rapid pace showing the nation's inclinations towards space readiness.

In June 2013, Iran inaugurated its first space monitoring center located near Delijan in Markazi province, according to Iran's Defense Minister General Ahmad Vahidi the new center which was named Imam Ja'far Sadeq would mostly be used to track and detect space objects and satellites passing overhead using radar, electro-optic and radio systems.

Iran is building a space center in Chabahar, the first phase will be operational in 2025.

In line with the ISA's 10-year space program, the Chabahar Space Center is scheduled to be fully operational and capable of carrying out international space launches by the end of March 2031, the spokesperson added.

== Internet constellation ==
The government has announced that there will be an internet satellite to combat Starlink.

== Human spaceflight program ==
Iran expressed for the first time its intention to send a human to space during the summit of Soviet and Iranian Presidents at 21 June 1990. Soviet President Mikhail Gorbachev reached an agreement in principle with then-President Akbar Hashemi Rafsanjani to make joint Soviet-Iranian crewed flights to Mir space station but this agreement was never realized after the breakup of the Soviet Union.

Almost two decades later the Iranian News Agency claimed on 21 November 2005, that the Iranians have a human space program along with plans for the development of a spacecraft and a space laboratory.

Iran Aerospace Industries Organization (IAIO) head Reza Taghipour on 20 August 2008, revealed Iran intends to launch a human mission into space within a decade. This goal was described as the country's top priority for the next 10 years, in order to make Iran the leading space power of the region by 2021.

In August 2010, President Ahmadinejad announced that Iran's first astronaut should be sent into space on board an Iranian spacecraft by no later than 2019. According to Iranian human space program, the first sub-orbital spaceflight was take place by 2016 at an altitude below 200 kilometres as preparation for the eventual orbital spaceflight. No such vehicle was developed.

In 2010, Iran launched a capsule into space containing a rat, two turtles and a worm on board the Kashgovar-3, then in 2011, launched a test capsule for a monkey on board the Kashgovar-4. Unfortunately, when the monkey was launched on the Kashgovar-5, the rocket suffered catastrophic failure and was destroyed with the monkey perishing. Iranian state media did not report on the incident and the entire crewed space program was put on hold.

On 17 February 2015, Iran unveiled a mock prototype of crewed spaceship that would be capable of taking astronauts into space. According to Iran's Space Administrator, this program was put on hold in 2017 indefinitely. In 2021, the spaceship was being prepared to send a human into space by 2026.

On 6 December 2023, Iran resumed launching live animals into space in a capsule mounted on a new type of rocket called "Salman". Iran's telecommunications director claims the effort is part of Iran's program to send at least one Iranian astronaut to space in a fully indigenous crewed spacecraft on a fully indigenous rocket by 2029.

=== Space station ===
An Iranian participation in the Chinese space station program has been announced. International human spaceflight cooperation has officially been disclosed for the first time after the launch of the Chinese Shenzhou 7 spacecraft.

=== Lunar program ===
On 29 February 2012, Iran opened its Alborz Space Center to western journalists for the first time ever. There the journalists had a press conference with representatives from the Iranian Space Agency who touted that they were planning on sending a human to the moon by 2025. This was met by immediate skepticism as Iran's launch capabilities at this time, and as of 2012, are limited to small payloads to low earth orbit.

== Controversy ==
The Iranian space program has been condemned by United States and Europe because of their concern over its military potential. Some analysts have compared the relatively fast Iranian advancement in space technology to Soviet Sputnik program with the prediction that this advancement will propel Iran's military capability in other areas as well. The military concerns over Iran's space program has been exacerbated over Safir rocket's advanced 2nd stage which Iran has kept secret by not releasing any technical information related to the second stage of the rocket, keeping outside observers guessing over the technicalities. For Radio Free Europe, independent experts interviewed disagreed with assertion made by the U.S. and various European countries. SIPRI's Tytti Erästö stated space launch vehicle program can contribute to missile development yet it isn't a shortcut for development of long range missiles such as intercontinental ballistic missiles, historically the ICBMs were converted to SLVs and never was in history SLV converted to ICBM. IISS Michael Elleman stated that claims made by the U.S. such as Mike Pompeo are grossly exaggerating contribution of SLV program to ICBM program and that it is misguided to suggest that SLV program is cover for nuclear capable ICBMs as claims made are a political statement. ST Analytics Markus Schiller stated that there is no indication that Iran is trying to develop missiles with range longer than 2000 km as Iran has been working on improving accuracy of their existing short and medium range missiles.

=== Sabotage by the U.S. ===
In 2019, The New York Times reported that the U.S. has been sabotaging Iran's space program for years and that it planned to widen its efforts.

=== Iran's Supreme Leader's Support for Aerospace Technology in Iran ===
The Supreme Leader of Iran closely followed the details of projects such as the launch of the "Omid Satellite" and considered it a sign of the truthfulness of the revolution's hopes and strengthening the self-confidence of the youth. Also, senior commanders such as General Hajizadeh attribute the rapid progress in missile and space technology and the overcoming of sanctions obstacles to the "foresight", "demanding" and "direct support" of the leader.

== See also ==
- Iranian Space Research Center
- Aerospace Force of the Islamic Revolutionary Guard Corps
- Anousheh Ansari – First Iranian-American cosmonaut
- Colonization of Mars
- Colonization of the Moon
- Economy of Iran
- International rankings of Iran in science and technology
- Iran Aviation Industries Organization
- List of first orbital launches by country
- List of government space agencies
- List of Iranian research centers
- List of missions to the Moon
- National spacefaring programs
- Science and technology in Iran
