= Lunar lander (disambiguation) =

A lunar lander is a space vehicle designed to land on the Moon.

Lunar Lander may also refer to:

- Apollo Lunar Module (LM or LEM), the lander used in the Apollo human spaceflight program from 1969 to 1972
- Lunar Lander (space mission), a proposed lunar mission by the European Space Agency (ESA)
- Lunar Lander Challenge, a competition to produce VTVL vehicles with sufficient delta-v to fly from the Moon to orbit
- Lunar Lander (video game genre), a type of video games simulating a Moon landing, starting in 1969
  - Lunar Lander (1979 video game), a 1979 arcade game by Atari which uses a vector monitor
