= ESEO =

ESEO or eseo may refer to:

- European Student Earth Orbiter in the Student Space Exploration & Technology Initiative
- École supérieure d'électronique de l'Ouest, a French Grande École
