= Khayyam satellite =

Iranian satellite

Khayyam
- Mission type: Earth observation satellite
- Operator: Iran
- COSPAR ID: 2022-096A
- SATCAT no.: 53370
- Mission duration: 5 years (planned)

Spacecraft properties
- Manufacturer: VNIIEM
- Payload mass: 650 kg

Start of mission
- Launch date: August 9, 2022 05:52:38 UTC
- Rocket: Soyuz-2.1b/Fregat
- Launch site: Baikonur Site 31/6

Orbital parameters
- Reference system: Geocentric
- Regime: Low Earth
- Semi-major axis: 6869 km
- Perigee altitude: 496.8 km
- Apogee altitude: 500.6 km
- Inclination: 97.4º
- Period: 94.4 min

The Khayyam satellite (Persian: خیام) is an Iranian high-resolution imaging satellite that was successfully sent into low Earth orbit on 9 August 2022. It was launched from the Baikonur space base in Kazakhstan, on a Russian Soyuz rocket. The satellite was designed by the Iranian Space Agency and built by Russian companies VNIIEM and NPK Barl in a contract that included technology transfer and providing technological assistance in future Khayyam satellite family designs by Iran. It is named after Iranian polymath Omar Khayyam.

== Specifications ==
Khayyam is a 650 kilograms (1,430 lb) satellite situated in an orbit 500 kilometres (310 mi) above the Earth's surface. Its main purpose is to collect information and images from the Earth's surface with a resolution of 1 metre (3.3 feet). It is designed to monitor and investigate the Earth's surface, both for government and civilian purposes.

According to the Iranian Space Agency, the life of this satellite is expected to be five years, the first four months of which will be spent undergoing tests.

== Implications ==
According to the parties, the successful launch and placing of this satellite in orbit is an important milestone in the development of bilateral relations and paves the way for further expansion and strengthening of cooperation between the two countries in the space industry. It is said that this is the first of a series of 4.

The launch came just three weeks after President Vladimir Putin and Iran's Supreme Leader Ayatollah Ali Khamenei vowed to cooperate against the West.

The head of Iran's governmental space agency, Hassan Salarieh, stated that the contract to order the Khayyam satellite to the Russian company was related to before the start of the 2022 Russian invasion of Ukraine.

The Washington Post reported that U.S. officials are worried about the nascent space cooperation between Russia and Iran, particularly that the satellite would provide Iran with surveillance of the Middle East and potential military targets therein, as well as helping Russia in Ukraine.

== See also ==
- Omid
- Safir (rocket)
- Simorgh (rocket)
