= Omid =

Iranian communications satellite

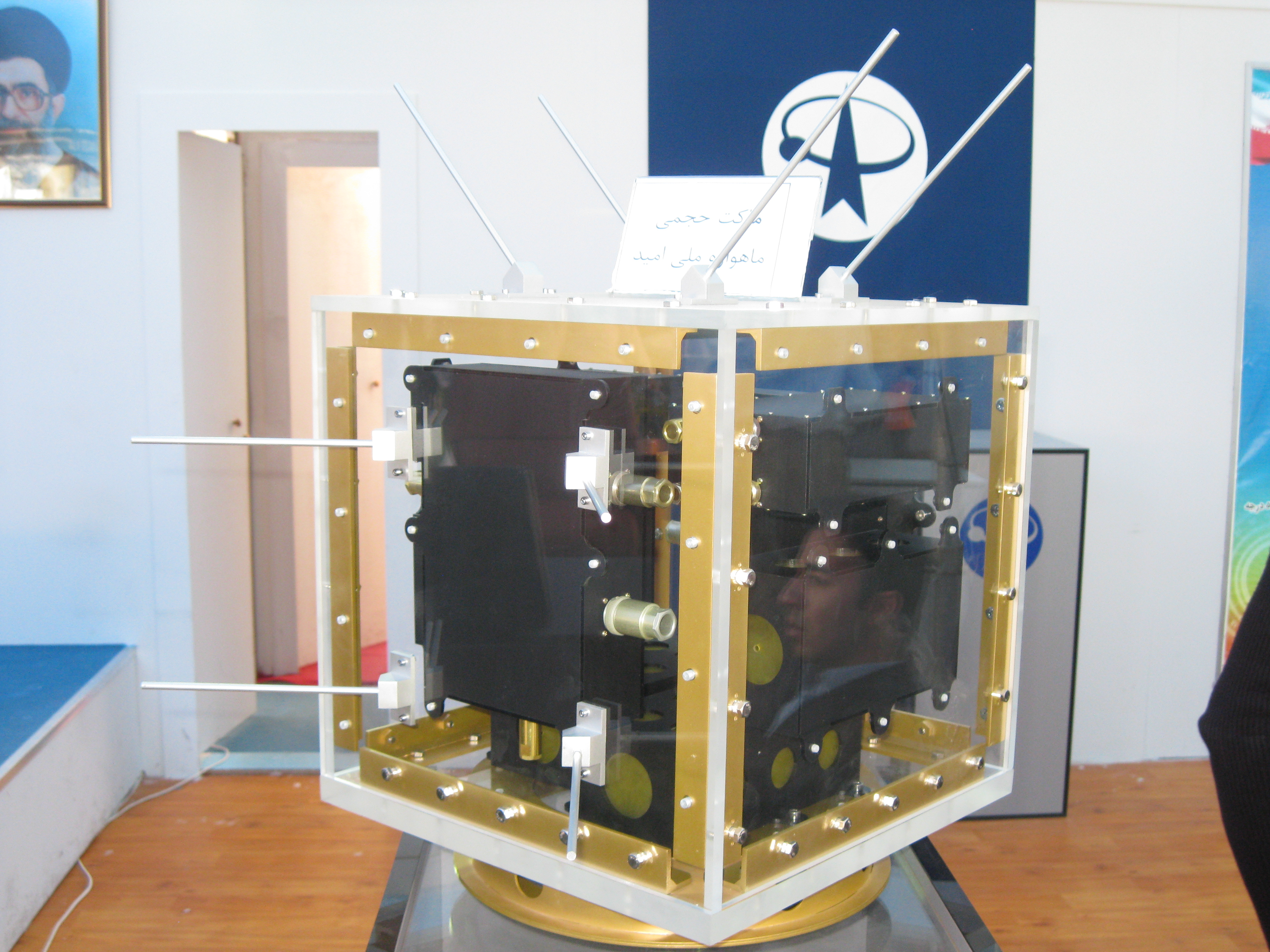
- Operator: ISA
- COSPAR ID: 2009-004A
- SATCAT no.: 33506

Spacecraft properties
- Launch mass: 26 kg (57 lb)

Start of mission
- Launch date: 2 February 2009
- Rocket: Safir-1
- Launch site: Semnan

End of mission
- Deactivated: April 2009
- Decay date: 25 April 2009

Orbital parameters
- Reference system: Geocentric
- Regime: Low Earth
- Eccentricity: 0
- Perigee altitude: 258 kilometres (160 mi)
- Apogee altitude: 364.8 kilometres (226.7 mi)
- Inclination: 55.5 degrees
- Period: 90.7 minutes
- Epoch: 2 February 2009, 13:34:00 UTC

Omid (Persian: امید, meaning "Hope") was Iran's first domestically made satellite. Omid was a data-processing satellite for research and telecommunications; Iran's state television reported that it was successfully launched on 2 February 2009. After being launched by an Iranian-made carrier rocket, Safir 1, the satellite was placed into a low Earth orbit. President Mahmoud Ahmadinejad supervised the launch, which coincided with the 30th anniversary of the Iranian Revolution; NASA verified the launch's success the following day. Its Satellite Catalog Number or USSPACECOM object number is 33506.

Ahmadinejad said the satellite was launched to spread "tawhid, peace and justice" in the world. The Tehran Times reported that "Iran has said it wants to put its own satellites into orbit to monitor natural disasters in the earthquake-prone nation and improve its telecommunications." Foreign minister Manouchehr Mottaki said that Iran launched the satellite to "meet the needs of the country" and that it was "purely for peaceful purposes". Since there was very little encryption on the satellite, data could be collected and read by citizens.

Omid had the shape of a 40-centimeter (16 in) cube with mass of 27 kilograms (60 lb). Sources in the Iranian Space Agency say the satellite's sole payload was a store and forward telecommunication capability.

The launch of Omid makes Iran the ninth country to develop an indigenous satellite launch capability.

== Specifications ==
- Store and Forward Telecommunication Satellite
- Dimensions: 40 cm × 40 cm × 40 cm
- Weight: 27 kg
- Thermal Control: Passive
- Frequency Band: UHF
- Nodal Period: 90.7 minutes
- Inclination: 55.71°
- Apogee: 381.2 km
- Perigee: 245.5 km

== Previous Iranian satellites ==
Omid was the second Iranian satellite to be placed into orbit. A previous Iranian satellite, Sina-1, was built and launched for Iran by Russia in 2005.

== Test launch ==
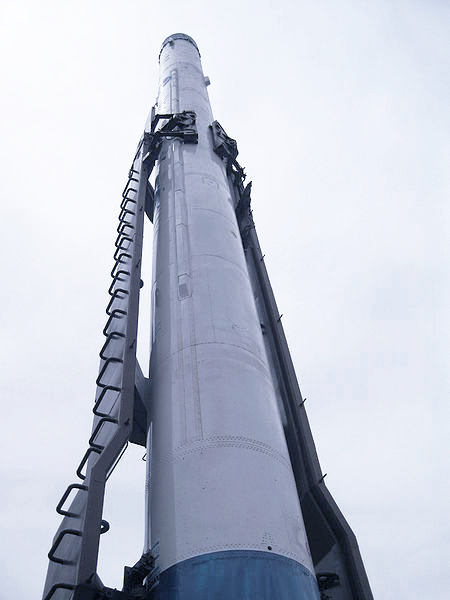
The Safir-Omid 2 carrier rocket that launched this satellite into space.

Speaking at the opening of a new space centre on 4 February 2008, President Ahmadinejad announced that Omid would be launched in "the near future". On 17 August 2008, Iranian officials reported that they performed a test of the satellite carrier; they broadcast footage of the Safir rocket launch in darkness.

According to an American official, "The vehicle failed shortly after liftoff and in no way reached its intended position."

== Orbit ==
Omid Telemetry
AFSK Telemetry recorded from the Omid satellite. The deep fades may be caused by the satellite tumbling in its orbit.

The satellite was launched southeast over the Indian Ocean to avoid overflying neighboring countries and was placed into an orbit with an inclination of 55.5 degrees, with a perigee of 246 km, an apogee of 377 km, and a period of 90.76 minutes.

== End of mission ==
Omid was reported to have completed its mission without any problems. It completed more than 700 orbits over seven weeks. According to U.S. Strategic Command, the Omid satellite re-entered Earth's atmosphere on 25 April 2009, during an 8-hour window centered on 0342 UT. The most likely re-entry location was over the south Atlantic Ocean, east of Buenos Aires, Argentina. No sightings were reported. The rocket body from the launch, which had also entered orbit, re-entered the atmosphere 31 May 2009.

== Further launches ==
Iran launched Rasad 1 on 15 June 2011; it orbited for three weeks.

== See also ==
- Iranian Space Agency
- Khayyam satellite
- List of orbits
- Safir (rocket)
- Sina-1
- Timeline of first orbital launches by country
