= National Satellite Launch Base =

Chabahar Space Launch Terminal
- پایانه فضایی چابهار

General information
- Status: Phase 1 completed
- Location: South East Sistan and Baluchestan Chabahar
- Opened: February 2026
- Owner: Iranian Space Agency (ISA)

National Satellite Launch Base (Persian: پایگاه ملی پرتاب), also called Chabahar Space Base (Persian: پایگاه فضایی چابهار), is an Iranian low Earth orbit launch base in Chabahar, Sistan province.

It is run by the Iranian Space Agency. Different reports give its size as 14,000 hectares (140 km^{2}) or 25 square kilometres (2,500 ha). Phase 1 was planned to be opened in 2025. In Phase 2, the launch site is planned to be open for space launch of foreign countries' satellites too. Phase 3 will enable launch of rockets with solid fuel launch vehicles.

In line with the ISA's 10-year space program, the Chabahar Space Center is scheduled to be fully operational and capable of carrying out international space launches by the end of March 2031, the spokesperson added.

In February 2026, Iranian Space Agency President Hassan Salarieh announced that construction of Phase 1 had been completed.
