= David Arkless =

British businessman (born 1954)

David Arkless FRSA
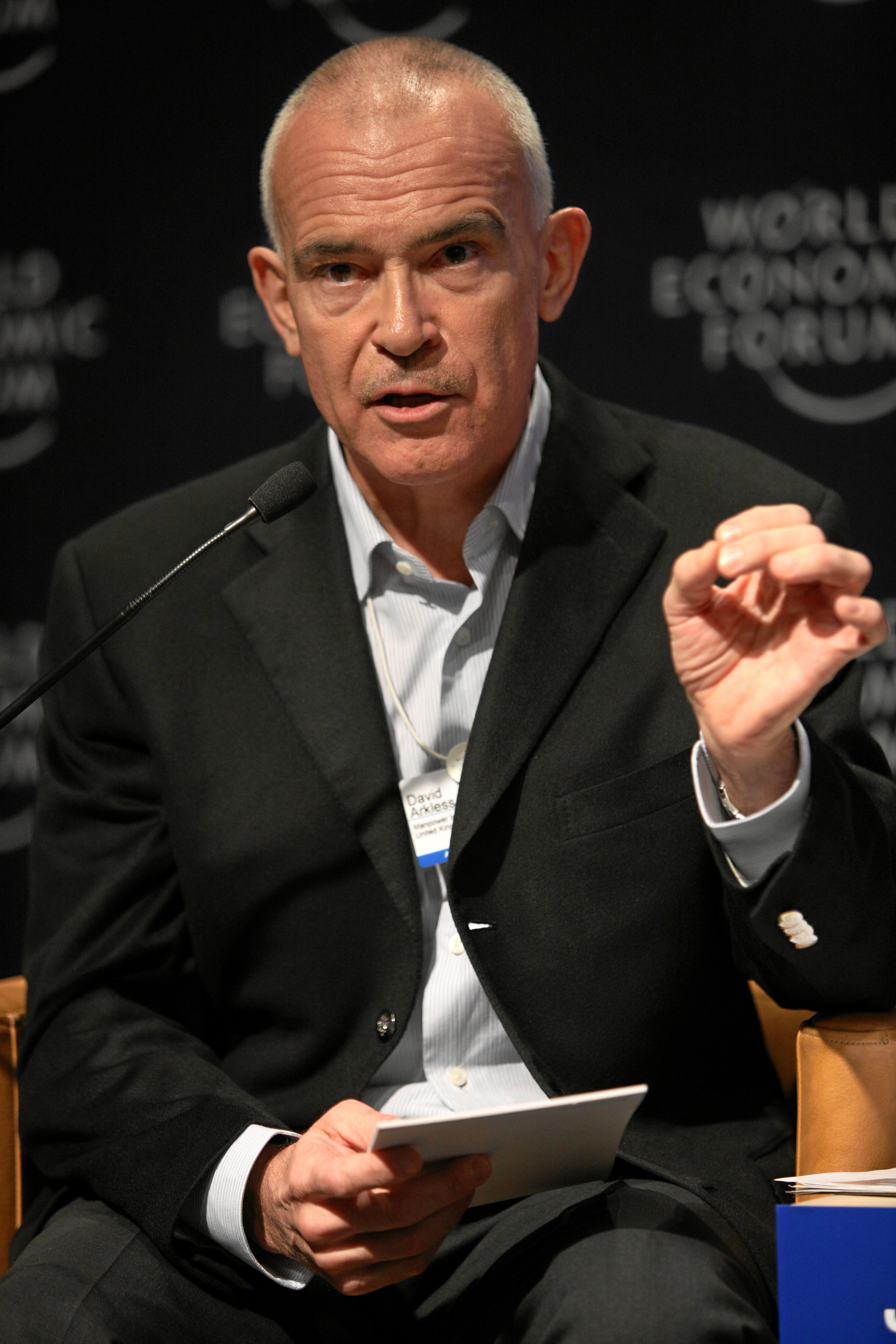
- Arkless at the World Economic Forum (2009)
- Born: February 1954 (age 72)
- Education: Durham University (BA); INSEAD
- Occupations: Business executive and consultant

David Edwin Wilson Arkless (born February 1954) is a British businessman. He was president of Corporate and Government Affairs at ManpowerGroup and later president, International, of CDI Corporation.

Since 2013 he has served as chairman of ArkLight Consulting.

== Early life and education ==
Arkless grew up on a council estate near Durham and was an active rugby player in his youth.

He studied General Arts at Durham University, graduating in 1976. He has subsequently completed executive programs at INSEAD, IMD and the College of Business at San Jose State University.

== Career ==
Arkless worked for Hewlett-Packard in the human resources department and later founded the business consultancy Caden Corporation, which was immediately successful.

He joined staffing firm Manpower in 1993 when they bought his company. His first role was to "coordinate" Europe, which meant ensuring 42 independently run country organisations worked together smoothly. In December 2008, he was appointed president of Corporate and Government Affairs, having previously served as senior vice-president of Global Corporate Affairs. His work focused particularly on international labour markets, and he advised governments including those of China, Vietnam and the United Arab Emirates.

Arkless represented ManpowerGroup on the board of the International Confederation of Private Employment Agencies (CIETT) from 2007 and was elected its vice-president in 2011 for a three-year term. He also served on advisory bodies associated with the International Organization for Migration and United Nations High Commissioner for Refugees, and was a core adviser to the United Nations Global Initiative to Fight Human Trafficking (UN.GIFT).

After leaving ManpowerGroup, Arkless founded ArkLight Consulting. In October 2014, he joined CDI Corporation as executive vice-president and president, International.

Arkless has also been involved in initiatives against human trafficking. He served as president of End Human Trafficking Now and was a founding counsellor and co-chair of the Global Business Coalition Against Trafficking. In 2014, he gave evidence to the parliamentary joint committee scrutinising the Draft Modern Slavery Bill.

== Personal life ==
Arkless is an honorary professor at Durham University and a board member of Durham University Business School. He is a Fellow of the Royal Society of Arts and a member of the Travellers Club.
