= Mozhayets-5 =

Orbital satellite

Можаец-5
- Mission type: Technology
- COSPAR ID: 2005-043G
- SATCAT no.: 28898

Spacecraft properties
- Manufacturer: AO Polyot; Mozhaisky Military Space Academy

Orbital parameters
- Reference system: Geocentric

The Mozhayets 5 (Russian: Можаец-5) was a Russian satellite launched on Thursday, 27 October 2005. Manufactured by AO Polyot and Mozhaisky Military Space Academy the satellite's purpose was to carry a set of scientific equipment for studying the effects of outer space factors on the operation of microelectronic devices and onboard computers.

Shortly after launch telemetry fell silent as its Kosmos-3M launch vehicle failed to separate from its third rocket stage and never reached an operational state.

However, another satellite launched into orbit with Mozhayets-5 – the European Space Agency's (ESA) student-built SSETI Express spacecraft – was placed in a safe mode due to an undervoltage caused by battery charging problems, after reaching its own proper orbit.

The Mozhayets-5 glitch follows a series of problems afflicting Russian launchers and satellites, including the loss of Europe's CryoSat spacecraft and the Demonstrator spacecraft, an inflatable reentry vehicle that appeared to launch properly but could not be found later by recovery crews.
