= Zohreh =

Zohreh (Persian: زهره, Arabic:زهرة) is an Arabic female given name which means "Venus".

== People ==
- Zohreh (born 18th century; died 19th century), musician; Kamancheh, Setar, and Tar player
- Zohreh Akhyani
- Zohreh Jooya
- Zohreh Lajevardi
- Zohreh Mojabi
- Zohreh Sefati
- Zohreh Tabatabai
- Zohreh Tabibzadeh-Nouri

== See also ==
- Zohreh, a proposed state-owned communications satellite that was not built.
- Zahreh, a city in and the capital of Cham Khalaf-e Isa District, in Hendijan County, Khuzestan Province, Iran, also sometimes romanized Zohreh
