= Iranian Space Research Center =

- Official logo of ISRC

Agency overview
- Formed: 1 January 2000; 26 years ago
- Jurisdiction: Ministry of Information and Communications Technology of Iran
- Headquarters: Tehran
- Annual budget: $67,000,000 (2014) $128,000,000(2023)
- Website: www.isrc.ac.ir

The Iranian Space Research Center (ISRC, Persian: پژوهشگاه فضایی ایران, romanized: Pazhoheshgah e Fazái e Irán) is a research center and institute established by Iran's Ministry of Information and Communications Technology in 2000 to perform research in the field of space and manufacture Iranian civil satellites and space rockets. In 2010, the administration was transferred to the office of president. Then, it again transferred to its primary ministry. On 13 March 2026, during the 2026 Iran war, the ISRC headquarters in central Tehran was struck by Israel.

== Overview ==
The ISRC and Iranian Space Agency are the main organizations driving space research and operations in Iran. The ISRC provides educational resources in the discipline of space sciences, designed for high-achieving postgraduate and doctoral scholars, adhering to criteria and international educational principles set by the Ministry of Science, Research and Technology:

- Designing, manufacturing and launching four generations of space sounding rockets (eight sounding payloads)
- Manufacturing and testing the cold gas propulsion system

Identification of standards used in the designing, manufacturing and testing of space equipment

- Designing and construction of the microgravity simulator
- Conceptual design of an orbiting spacecraft carrying the living organism
- Aerospace applications in environmental studies and environmental remote sensing.

Furthermore, more than 500 completed and 156 ongoing research projects are being carried out currently, entitled:

- Designing, construction and testing the first generation of suborbital crewed spacecraft.
- Telemetry conceptual design for the altitude of 250 km
- Designing, manufacturing and testing the recovery system for a 500 kg payload.
- Dynamic analysis of the astronaut’s Body for suborbital spaceflights
- Feasibility study of the attitude control system for sounding rockets
- Designing, manufacturing and testing "the moving- mass control actuator"
- Providing educational facilities for training elite and talented students in post-graduate and doctoral level, as well as training skilled and expert workforce in space sciences

On 12 September 2018, the US Treasury Department announced in a statement that it has added the names of the Space Organization, the Space Research Center and the Space Research Institute of Iran to the list of sanctions Office of Foreign Assets Control (OFAC) of the entities under this ministry. This research and educational institute is currently under the sanctions of the United States of America, United Kingdom, Canada and New Zealand.

By order of the Minister of Communications and Information Technology, Hassan Salarieh was appointed as the head of the Iranian Space Research Institute, while maintaining his position.

During the 2026 Iran war, the Israeli Air Force attacked the ISRC in central Tehran and completely destroyed it, claiming that it was being used for 'potential' space warfare activities against Israeli satellites.

== Research units ==
The Iranian Space Research Institute has 5 research institutes, including two system research institutes called Satellite Systems and Space Transportation Systems in Tehran, three research institutes in provincial centers called Space Propulsion, Mechanics, and Materials and Energy in Tabriz, Shiraz, and Isfahan, respectively, and one research center.

- Space Transportation Systems Research Institute
- Materials and Energy Research Institute
- Space Propulsion Research Institute
- Satellite Systems Research Institute
- Mechanics Research Institute

== Activities ==
Among the activities of the Iranian Space Research Institute:

- Construction of the Saman orbital transfer block
- Use of artificial intelligence in the space industry
- Launch of two Iranian satellites "Hodhod" and "Kowsar"
- Activities in the field of geographic information system
- Construction of the engineering model of the U3 cube satellite
- Opening of the Space Mission Operation Center
- Launch of the "Pars 1" satellite
- Satellite "Nahid 2"
- Launch of the "Mahda" satellite with "Simorgh"
- Invention of space solar panels with high power and longevity
- Production of a satellite image with a resolution of 35 to 45 centimeters for the first time in Iran
- Launch of "Chamran-1" satellite

And other activities.

== Research units ==
=== Space Transportation Systems Research Institute ===
This research institute has been active in various scientific and technical fields since 1983, implementing various applied projects in line with national needs, and was transferred to the Iranian Space Organization in 2010. The Space Transportation Systems Research Institute is currently one of the system research institutes of the Iranian Space Research Institute.

=== Satellite Systems Research Institute ===
The Space Research Institute at the Iranian Space Organization was established in 2007 with the permission of the Higher Education Development Council to meet some of the country's research needs in the field of space technologies, and is now operating under the title of the Satellite Systems Research Institute at the Iranian Space Research Institute. The main tasks of this research institute are to implement research, application, and development projects in space science and technology, and to study, design, and build measurement and communication satellites.

=== Space Propulsion Research Institute ===
In order to achieve self-sufficiency and independence of the country and the necessity of resolving technical and engineering problems, the potential and favorable fields such as the existence of universities, factories, industrial companies and potential and actual facilities in East Azerbaijan province, the Engineering Research Center in East Azerbaijan began its activities in 1985. This center was promoted to the Iranian Space Research Institute as the Space Propulsion Research Institute and continues its activities.

=== Materials and Energy Research Institute ===
The Materials and Energy Research Institute is one of the research institutes of the Iranian Space Research Institute located in Isfahan. The mission areas of this research institute are in materials and manufacturing and shaping technologies, energy generators, detectors and special machinery and equipment.

=== Mechanical Research Institute ===
The Mechanical Research Institute was established in Shiraz in 1986 with the aim of meeting some of the technical and engineering needs of the country's industries and providing services to these sectors. Then, in 1990, it was upgraded to a research institute by transferring to the Iranian Space Organization and is now one of the three provincial research institutes affiliated with the Iranian Space Research Institute.

== See also ==
- List of government space agencies
