= UWE-1 =

German student cubesat

- Names: Universität Würzburg's Experimentalsatellit-1
- Mission type: Technology demonstration
- Operator: University of Würzburg
- COSPAR ID: 2005-043C
- SATCAT no.: 28892
- Mission duration: 12 months (planned); 21 days (achieved)

Spacecraft properties
- Spacecraft type: 1U CubeSat
- Bus: CubeSat
- Manufacturer: University of Würzburg
- Launch mass: 1 kg (2.2 lb)
- Dimensions: 10 × 10 × 10 cm (3.9 × 3.9 × 3.9 in)
- Power: 2 watts

Start of mission
- Launch date: 27 October 2005, 06:52:26 UTC
- Rocket: Kosmos-3M
- Launch site: Plesetsk, Site 132/1
- Contractor: Yuzhnoye / NPO Polyot
- Entered service: 27 October 2005

End of mission
- Last contact: 17 November 2005

Orbital parameters
- Reference system: Geocentric orbit
- Regime: Sun-synchronous orbit
- Perigee altitude: 682 km (424 mi)
- Apogee altitude: 708 km (440 mi)
- Inclination: 98.18°
- Period: 98.67 minutes
- UWE satellite Series

UWE-1 (Universität Würzburg's Experimentalsatellit-1) was one of three CubeSats built by students of the University of Würzburg, launched on 27 October 2005 as part of the European Space Agency's SSETI Express mission from Plesetsk in Russia, orbiting Earth in a 686 km (426 mi) circular orbit. The cube-shaped satellite weighs about 1 kg and has an edge length of 10 cm, which corresponds to the CubeSat standard.

== Mission ==
The primary mission of UWE-1 was to conduct telecommunication experiments. Among other things, it was about the data transmission on the Internet under space conditions: It was necessary to adapt the common Internet protocols to the difficult conditions in space environment on Earth, the transport of data on the Web works very reliable, but in space can increasingly delays and disruptions occur. Furthermore, UWE-1 also served as a test laboratory for highly efficient solar cells, whose performance and durability should be investigated.

Downlink/uplink frequency was 437.505 MHz, modulation was 9600 baud AFSK. The amateur radio sign of UWE-1 was DPØUWE.

== End of mission ==
The last contact with the satellite took place on 17 November 2005. An identical UWE test model was made available to the Deutsches Museum in Munich in 2012, where it is exhibited together with a test model of the successor UWE-2 in the space department. UWE-1 was followed by the later UWE-2 launched into space on 23 September 2009.

UWE-1 still circles around the Earth today but fell silent after conducting the Internet experiments in 2005. Due to the friction with the rest of the atmosphere, UWE-1 continues braking until it will burn up completely in about 30 years.

== See also ==
- List of CubeSats
