= Taher Helmy =

Egyptian lawyer

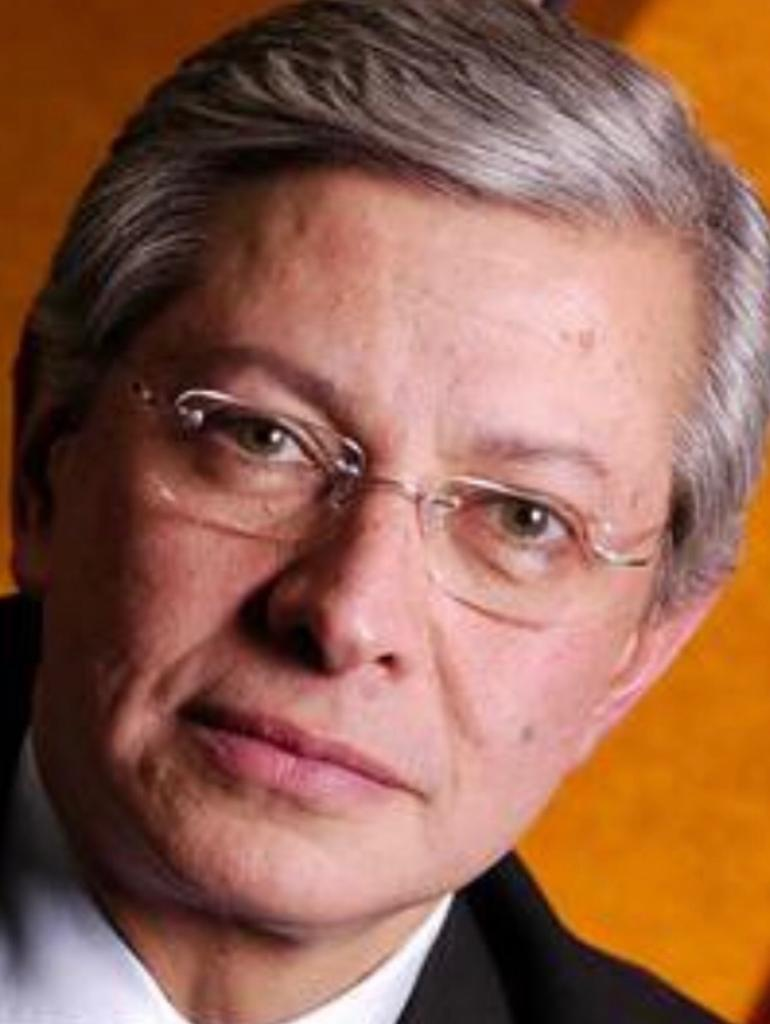
Dr. Taher Helmy, Founder and Senior Partner of the Egyptian Law Firm Helmy, Hamza & Partners and Senior Partner of the International Law Firm of Baker & McKenzie

Taher Helmy is the Founder and Senior Partner of the Egyptian Law Firm Helmy, Hamza & Partners and Senior Partner of the International Law Firm of Baker & McKenzie. He is a member of Illinois and Chicago Bar Associations, is admitted before the Federal Court of the U.S. and was the first Arab lawyer to be admitted before the US Supreme Court in 1979. He is admitted before Egypt's Supreme Court and was admitted to practice in Saudi Arabia in 1979 and is the only lawyer admitted in the United States, Egypt and Saudi Arabia.

He joined the international law firm of Baker & McKenzie in May 1975. In 1981, he was elected full partner. Baker & McKenzie is the world’s leading global law firm with over 4,200 lawyers, practicing in 77 offices located in 47 countries around the world. He practiced with Baker & McKenzie’s head office in Chicago for approximately nine years, in Riyadh, Saudi Arabia, for four years and in Egypt since 1987, handling corporate, banking and commercial matters. He co-founded the offices of Baker & McKenzie in Riyadh and Cairo. He served as a member of the Strategic Planning Committee and is currently a member of the Policy Committee of Baker & McKenzie.

He participated in drafting and reviewing numerous pieces of Egyptian legislation, as well as the US/Egyptian Investment Treaty.

He is a founder and former chairman of the Egyptian Center for Economic Studies, the first independent, private, non-profit economic Think Tank in Egypt. He is the former president of the American Chamber of Commerce in Egypt and former member of the US/Egypt President’s Council. He is the former co-chairman of the U.S-Egypt Business Leaders Forum and founder and member of the executive board of Egypt’s International Economic Forum. He is a co-founder of the British Egyptian Businessmen Association and a member of the French Chamber of Commerce.
