= Zohreh Tabatabai =

Iranian diplomat and business coordinator

- Born: Iran
- Known for: Diplomat and communications coordinator

Zohreh Tabatabai is an Iranian diplomat and international business coordinator. She served in the United Nations as chief of the "Focal Point for women for the United Nations system". She also served in the UN's International Labour Organization (ILO) in Geneva as a Communications Adviser. She then established Quince Partners, an enterprise dealing with communications and public relations.

Tabatabai is represented on NGOs, non-profit institutions, and charitable establishments which deal with human rights and women's empowerment. She was also a member of the End Human Trafficking Now (EHTN) campaign founded in 2006.

== Biography ==
Zohreh Tabatabai, an Iranian by birth, worked initially as a diplomat for ten years in the Ministry of Foreign Affairs of Iran. She then joined the United Nations (UN) in 1980 and held several positions over 20 years, including chief of the Public Services Section and three years as the Focal Point for women for the UN system. She was in charge of staff members who assisted her in managing the media. She served as chief coordinator of the UN's Fiftieth Anniversary Celebration in New York City.

Tabatabai worked to improve the cause of women working in the UN by enhancing employment and promotion opportunities when recruitment and retrenchment actions adversely affected the careers of women employees. She said, "The Focal Point should travel to other duty stations and peacekeeping missions to ensure that the message of the Secretary-General's commitment to gender equality is emphasized".

In 2002 she moved to Geneva to take up the post of Communications Adviser in the International Labour Organization (ILO). In 2010 she left ILO and formed Quince Partners, an enterprise dealing with communications and public relations.
