= SSETI Express (satellite) =

European student spacecraft

- Names: Express-OSCAR-53 (XO-53); Student Space Exploration & Technology Initiative Express
- Mission type: Technology demonstration
- Operator: European Space Agency
- COSPAR ID: 2005-043E
- SATCAT no.: 28894
- Mission duration: 2 months (planned); 12.5 hours (achieved)

Spacecraft properties
- Manufacturer: European Space Agency
- Launch mass: 62 kg (137 lb)
- Payload mass: 24 kg (53 lb)
- Dimensions: 56 × 56 × 90 cm (22 × 22 × 35 in)
- Power: 20 watts

Start of mission
- Launch date: 27 October 2005, 06:52:26 UTC
- Rocket: Kosmos-3M
- Launch site: Plesetsk, Site 132/1
- Contractor: Yuzhnoye / NPO Polyot
- Entered service: 27 October 2005

End of mission
- Last contact: 27 October 2005

Orbital parameters
- Reference system: Geocentric orbit
- Regime: Sun-synchronous orbit
- Perigee altitude: 682 km (424 mi)
- Apogee altitude: 708 km (440 mi)
- Inclination: 98.18°
- Period: 98.67 minutes

SSETI Express was the first spacecraft to be designed and built by European students and was launched by the European Space Agency. SSETI Express (Student Space Exploration & Technology Initiative) is a small spacecraft, similar in size and shape to a washing machine. On board the student-built spacecraft were three CubeSat picosatellites, extremely small satellites weighing around one kg each. These were deployed one hour and forty minutes after launch. Twenty-one university groups, working from locations spread across Europe and with very different cultural backgrounds, worked together via the internet to jointly create the satellite. The expected lifetime of the mission was planned to be 2 months. SSETI Express encountered an unusually fast mission development: less than 18 months from kick-off in January 2004 to flight-readiness.

== Picosatellites ==
The three picosatellites on board the spacecraft were:

- Xi-V (X-factor investigator-V) from University of Tokyo, Japan

Its primary mission is the demonstration of newly developed solar cells in space. Other mission objectives include the acquisition of Earth images by a commercial off-the-shelf digital camera and the operation of a message transmission service using an amateur radio frequency.

- UWE-1 (Universität Würzburg's Experimentalsatellit-1) from University of Würzburg, Germany

The main objective of UWE-1, is to conduct telecommunication experiments related to the optimisation of an internet-related infrastructure for space applications.

- NCube-2 (Norwegian CubeSat-2) from Andøya Rocket Range, Norway

This contains an automated identification system (AIS) used to receive GPS signals. The AIS signals from Ncube-2 are detected and forwarded to Ncube ground stations, allowing them to track the satellite.

== Purpose ==
The purpose of Express is to take pictures of the Earth, act as a test-bed and technology demonstrator for ESEO (European Student Earth Orbiter) hardware for a launch in 2007, and also function as a radio transponder for the global amateur radio community. It is a pilot project for the SSETI student community and a demonstration of how ESA experts can support student initiatives. As well as this, it is meant to be an inspiration for other educational satellite programmes, but also a logistical precursor to the future SSETI microsatellite projects.

== Launch ==
- Launch Date and Time: 27 October 2005 at 06:52:26 UTC
- Launch Vehicle: Kosmos-3M
- Launch Area: Plesetsk Cosmodrome
- First Signal: 27 October 2005 at 08:29 UTC
- Orbit Type: Sun-synchronous
- Altitude: 686 km
- Inclination: 98.18°

== Ground stations ==
The ground stations that manage the satellite when it is in orbit are as follows;

- Primary Ground Station (Aalborg, Denmark)

The main mission ground station consists of tracking antennas, an Ultra high frequency (UHF) radio, an S-Band to Very high frequency (VHF) down-converter, a VHF radio, a Terminal Node Controller (TNC) and a controlling computer. It is the primary command station for controlling the spacecraft.

- Secondary Ground Station (Svalbard, Norway)

The secondary ground station provides a redundant UHF support for telecommand uplink and mission telemetry downlink.

- Mission Control Computer (Aalborg, Denmark)

The Mission Control Computer (MCC) is the interface between the operations team and the two ground stations. It is capable of controlling the uplink of detailed flight plans to the spacecraft and has a database in which all downlinked telemetry is stored. The MCC can be remote controlled.

- Operations team (Warsaw, Poland)

The Operations team is responsible for defining the flight plans and commanding the spacecraft via the MCC and ground stations.

- Telemetry Interface Database (France)

The Telemetry Interface Database (TIDB) is a web-based application facilitating the dissemination of all mission telemetry from the MCC to SSETI Express teams, radio amateurs and the general public.

== Specifications ==
SSETI Express Components

- Size: 60 × 60 × 90 cm (24 × 24 × 35 in)
- UHF: 437.250 MHz, 9.6 kbit/s, AX.25 protocol
- S-Band: 2401.84 MHz, 38.4 kbit/s, AX.25 protocol
- Power Input: Body mounted solar panels
- Average Power Output: 12 W
- Peak Power Output: 20 watts
- Batteries: Li-ion, 90 Wh
- Propulsion: Nitrogen cold gas
- The unit consists of a one pressure tank with about 2 kg of gaseous nitrogen content at a pressure of 300 bar as propellant for the entire mission, a total of six valves, two pressure regulators for flow control, 4 miniature thrusters, three pressure transducers, and 10 temperature sensors
- Camera: 100 m/pixel, 1280*1024 pixels
- The camera is based on a Kodak CMOS image sensor that provides a resolution of 1280 x 1024 pixels in 24 bit color depth
- Weight: 62 kg (137 lb)
- Payload: 24 kg (53 lb)
- Thermal Control: Passive

== Subsystems ==
- ACDS (Aalborg, Denmark)

The Attitude Determination and Control System has two parts. The Attitude Control System uses semi-active magnetic stabilisation. A pair of magnetorquers provide detumbling functionality and actively damp any subsequent vibrations, while a passive permanent magnet ensures alignment of the spacecraft's z-axis with the Earth's magnetic field.

- CAM (Aalborg, Denmark)

The on-board camera (CAM) is based on a colour complementary metal oxide semiconductor (CMOS) sensor and an instrument control unit.

- EPS (Naples, Italy)

The Electrical Power System (EPS) is based on the concept of power generation by body-mounted photo-voltaic cells. The energy is stored in a rechargeable lithium-ion battery to ensure power is available during eclipse phases or during periods of low sunlight.

- Magic (Lausanne, Switzerland)

The Propulsion Instrument Control unit is affectionately referred to as the "Magic" box. This sub-system processes commands related to the propulsion system, controls the thruster valves and performs data acquisition from the various thermistors and pressure transducers.

- MIAS (Zaragoza, Spain)

The Mission Analysis (MIAS) subsystem doesn't produce any hardware, but data: it is in charge of the design of the space mission, as well as all the computations related to it, i.e., trajectories, eclipses, communication windows, etc. The MIAS team also assumed Flight Dynamics after the launch, which mainly confronted the current trajectory of the satellite with the expected one, and suggested corrections, in case these two differed too much.

- OBC (Aalborg, Denmark)

The On-Board Computer (OBC) controls the spacecraft during nominal and payload operations and collects all telemetry and payload data for subsequent transfer to the ground.

- PROP (Stuttgart, Germany)

The propulsion (PROP) payload is an attitude control cold-gas system with four low-pressure thrusters, fed by a pressure regulation system.

- S-Band ANT (Wroclaw, Poland)

The S band patch antennas (S-Band ANT) are adapted from the ESEO microsatellite. A set of three directional patch antennas are used, outputting a total of 3 watts of circularly polarised radiation at 2401.84 MHz.

- S-Band TX (AMSAT, United Kingdom)

Radio amateurs from the United Kingdom have developed the S-Band transmitter (S-Band TX). It serves a dual function providing both high-speed mission data downlink at 38400 bit/s and also, in combination with the UHF system, a single-channel audio transponder.

- STRU (Porto, Portugal)

The primary load-bearing spacecraft structure (STRU) consists of aluminium honeycomb panels configured in a similar way to the game known as tic-tac-toe or noughts and crosses. The secondary structure consists of 1 mm aluminium outer lateral panels, serving as mounting surfaces for the solar cells, Sun sensors and other lightweight equipment.

- T-Pod (Tokyo, Japan and Toronto, Canada)

The CubeSat deployment is from a T-POD (Tokyo-Picosatellite Orbital Deployer) system, developed jointly by ISSL (Intelligent Space Systems Laboratory) of the University of Tokyo and by UTIAS-SFL (University of Toronto, Institute for Aerospace Studies-Space Flight Laboratory), Toronto, Canada. The T-POD was used to store three passengers CubeSat during the launch and to deploy them from SSETI Express once orbit was achieved.

- UHF (Hohenbrunn, Germany)

The Ultra high frequency (UHF) unit contains a radio and a terminal node controller (TNC) and is the spacecraft's primary communications system.

== SSETI Express partners ==
- European Space Agency (ESA)
- Aalborg University, Denmark
- University of Naples Federico II, Italy
- AMSAT-UK, United Kingdom
- Andøya Rocket Range, Norway
- Dutch Space, Netherlands
- EADS Space
- Holger Eckardt, Germany
- IABG, Germany
- ISF, Germany
- KSAT, Norway
- Map, France
- Royal Netherlands Marine Korps, Netherlands
- Saft, France
- Snecma, SAFRAN Group
- Surrey Satellite Technologies Limited, United Kingdom
- University of Tokyo, Intelligent Space Systems Laboratory (ISSL)
- UTIAS-SFL, Canada
- University of Würzburg, Germany
- Williamson Électronique, France

== End of mission ==
On 28 October 2005, the ground control station in Aalborg had not had any contact with SSETI Express. Thorough analysis indicated that a failure in the electrical power system on board the spacecraft is preventing the batteries from charging, resulting in a shutdown of the satellite. The launch itself was successful but, unfortunately, the mission only lasted 12.5 hours as the solar array was unable to charge the batteries, due to a malfunction in the Electrical Power Subsystem. Nevertheless, in many respects SSETI Express was a great success and many valuable lessons were learned. Of the 19 subsystems, 12 operated successfully, 5 could not be tested because the mission ended prematurely, and only 2 failed (one of them with no consequence as there was a backup). The media impact was enormous, with an estimated 100 million TV viewers.

== See also ==
- European Space Agency
- JAXA
- NASA
- Spacecraft
- Spaceport
- Student Space Exploration & Technology Initiative
