= Korean Committee of Space Technology =

Former North Korean space agency

Korean Committee of Space Technology (KCST)
- 조선우주공간기술위원회

Agency overview
- Superseding agency: National Aerospace Technology Administration
- Jurisdiction: Government of North Korea
- Minister responsible: Kim Yong-chun, Minister of People's Armed Forces
- Agency executive: Ryu Kum Chol, Deputy director of Space Development Department of Korean Committee for Space Technology

Korean name
- Hangul: 조선우주공간기술위원회
- Hanja: 朝鮮宇宙空間技術委員會
- RR: Joseon uju gonggan gisul wiwonhoe
- MR: Chosŏn uju konggan kisul wiwŏnhoe

The Korean Committee of Space Technology (KCST; Korean: 조선우주공간기술위원회) was the agency of the government of the Democratic People's Republic of Korea (North Korea) responsible for the country's space program. The agency was terminated and succeeded by the National Aerospace Development Administration in 2013 after the Law on Space Development was passed in the 7th session of the 12th Supreme People's Assembly.

== History ==
Very little information on it is publicly available. It is known to have been founded sometime in the 1980s, and most likely is connected to the Artillery Guidance Bureau of the Korean People's Army.

== Operations ==
The KCST was responsible for all operations concerning space exploration and construction of satellites. On 12 March 2009, North Korea signed the Outer Space Treaty and the Registration Convention, after a previous declaration of preparations for a new satellite launch.

== Facilities ==
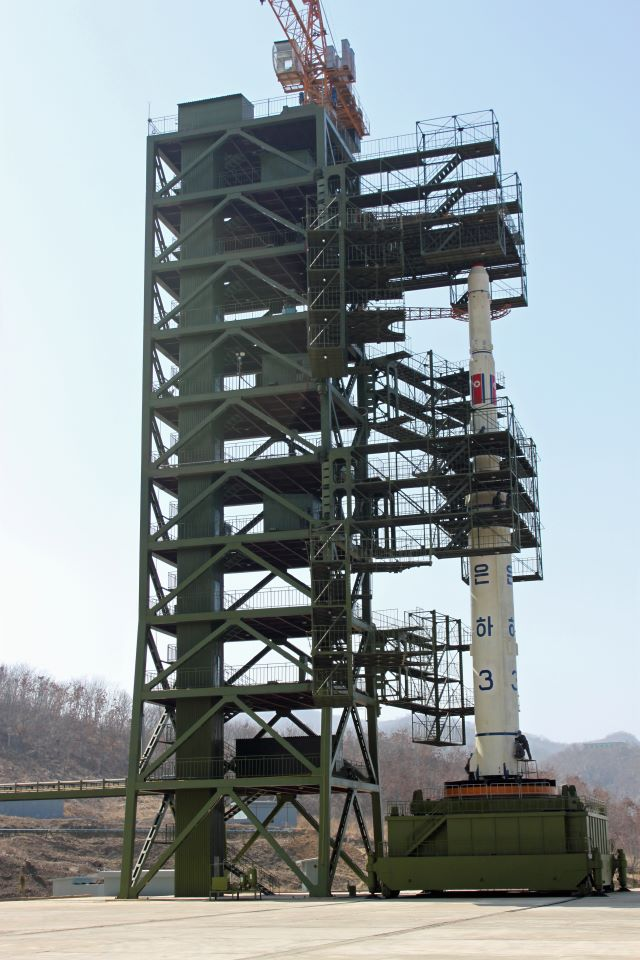
Unha-3 Rocket on 8 April 2012 in Sohae

The KCST operated the Tonghae Satellite Launching Ground and Sohae Satellite Launching Station rocket launching sites, Paektusan-1 and Unha launchers, Kwangmyŏngsŏng satellites.

South Korea and the United States accused North Korea of using these facilities and the rockets as a cover for a military ballistic missile testing program.

- Sohae Satellite Launching Station built from the 2000s to 2010s with a launch pad completed in 2011.
- Tonghae Satellite Launching Ground built from the 2000s to 2010s with a launch pad completed in 2011.

== Projects ==
The DPRK twice announced that it had launched satellites: Kwangmyŏngsŏng-1 on 31 August 1998 and Kwangmyŏngsŏng-2 on 5 April 2009. The US and South Korea predicted that the launches would in actuality be military ballistic missile tests, but later confirmed that they had followed orbital launch trajectories.

In 2009, the DPRK announced more ambitious future space projects including its own crewed space flights and development of a crewed partially reusable launch vehicle. Kwangmyŏngsŏng-3 was launched on 13 April 2012 and ended in failure shortly after launch. A follow-up attempt the following December, Kwangmyŏngsŏng-3 Unit 2 entered polar orbit as confirmed by various countries.

== Launch history ==
This is a list of satellites launched.

Launch history
Satellite	Launch Date (UTC)	Rocket	Launch Site	Status	Purpose
Kwangmyŏngsŏng-1	31 August 1998	Taepodong-1	Tonghae Satellite Launching Ground	Failed to reach orbit	Technology experimental satellite
	4 July 2006	Unha-1		Launch Failure	Rocket test (See 2006 North Korean missile test)
Kwangmyŏngsŏng-2	5 April 2009	Unha-2	Tonghae Satellite Launching Ground	Failed to reach orbit	Communications satellite
Kwangmyŏngsŏng-3	13 April 2012	Unha-3	Sohae Satellite Launching Station	Launch Failure	Observation satellite
Kwangmyŏngsŏng-3 Unit 2	12 December 2012	Unha-3	Sohae Satellite Launching Station	Successful launch	Observation satellite
Kwangmyŏngsŏng-4	7 February 2016	Unha	Sohae Satellite Launching Station	Successful launch	Observation satellite

== See also ==
- North Korean space program
- List of government space agencies
- List of space agencies
- National Aerospace Development Administration
