= 2009 North Korean missile tests =

Two rounds of North Korean missile tests were conducted in July 2009. On July 4, 2009, the Democratic People's Republic of Korea (the DPRK, or North Korea) launched seven short range missiles into the Sea of Japan (East Sea of Korea), after previously launching four missiles two days earlier on July 2. The missiles were launched in violation of United Nations Security Council Resolution 1874.

== Events ==
Missiles have been fired from the launch site at the port of Wonsan on the east coast of the country. Based on information from an anonymous government representative in Seoul, Korean agency Yonhap reported that the missiles are of the Scud type with a range of around 400 kilometers.

During the week North Korea announced upcoming military exercises in the Sea of Japan, and with it declared an area closed to navigation around the port of Vonsan and into the Sea of Japan and covering an area of 450 by 110 kilometers. The planned military exercises were announced to cover the period from June 25 to July 10.

The latest round of missile launches were timed for the United States' Independence Day as a show of military might and came on the heels of UNSC Resolution 1874. Sanctions and penalties were declared in the wake of the May 25 underground test of a nuclear explosive device by Pyongyang, and what the DPRK insist was an attempt to peacefully place a satellite in orbit but what the United States, Japan and South Korea see as cover for the development of a long-range ballistic missile.

The North Koreans have previously warned that any attempt to enact sanctions will be seen as an act of war.

The United Nations Security Council condemned the launches expressing "grave concern" and urged all countries in the region to refrain from any action that could escalate tensions.

== International reaction ==
- China: Foreign Ministry spokesman Qin Gang urged relevant sides to remain calm and exercise restraint.
- Japan: Chief Cabinet Secretary Takeo Kawamura condemned the launches, saying they were a "serious act of provocation against the security of neighboring countries" and violated U.N. Security Council resolutions.
- South Korea: South Korea condemned the launches and called them "deeply deplorable".
- United States: State Department spokesman Karl Duckworth said the tests were "not helpful" and warned North Korea not to aggravate tensions.

== See also ==
- List of North Korean missile tests
- 2009 North Korean nuclear test
- 2009 North Korean satellite rocket launch
- 2006 North Korean nuclear test
- 2006 North Korean missile test
- 1998 North Korean missile test
- 1993 North Korean missile test
