= 2006 North Korean missile test =

Two rounds of North Korean missile tests were conducted on July 5, 2006. The Democratic People's Republic of Korea (DPRK or North Korea) reportedly fired at least seven separate missiles. These included one long-range Taepodong-2 missile and short-range Scud derived missiles including the enlarged Nodong missile. The Taepodong-2 was estimated by United States intelligence agencies as having a potential range reaching as far as Alaska, although this missile failed after about 42 seconds of flight.

North Korea made its first public acknowledgement of the tests on July 6, through its foreign ministry, describing them as "successful" and part of "regular military drills to strengthen self-defense", insisting that it had the legal right to do so. The country warned of "stronger physical actions" if it were put under pressure by the international community. On July 8, CNN reported that the U.S. had deployed the USS Mustin, a guided missile destroyer, to the Japanese port of Yokosuka, home of the U.S. Navy's Seventh Fleet. A spokeswoman said that the deployment was not related to the test-firings, and it had been previously planned.

== Overview ==
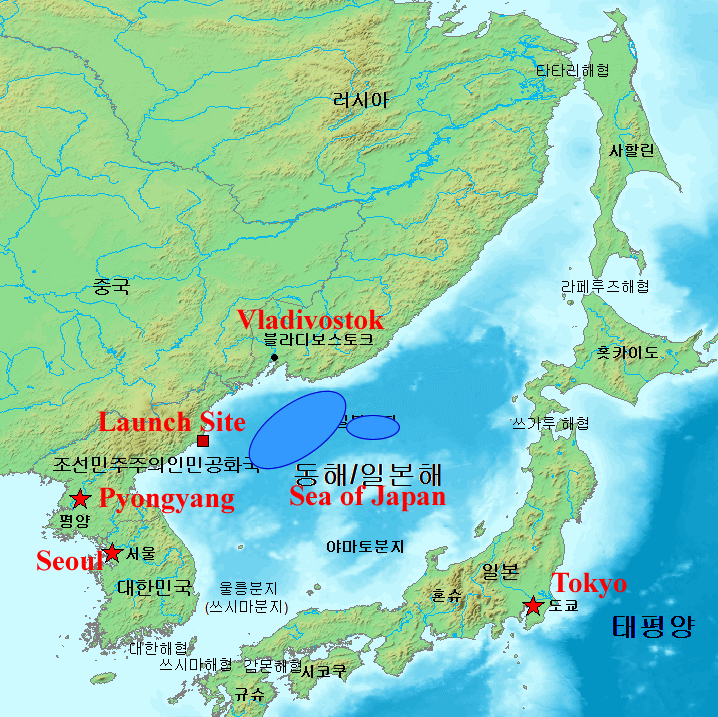
Probable location of missile impact (blue shaded region)

The missiles were launched from the Musudan-ri Missile Test Facility, and all of the missiles reportedly landed in the Sea of Japan, 500–600 kilometers west of the northern Japanese island of Hokkaidō, in international waters about 100 kilometers south of the Russian cities of Vladivostok and Nakhodka. It was also reported that two missiles landed in Russian territorial waters. Only the Taepodong-2 was launched from Musudan-ri. The Scuds and Nodongs were launched from Gitdaeryung, Anbyun, and Kangwon-do. (Also spelled as Kitdaeryung, as in the table of launch in next section)

The United States State Department has said that the Taepodong-2 missile failed in mid-air after about 42 seconds of flight and probably continued for 2 minutes in total. The first missile was launched Wednesday, July 5 at 03:33 KST (= July 4, 18:33 UTC) and the next two at 04:04 and 05:01 local time, respectively. The first launches came minutes before the successful launch of Space Shuttle Discovery in Florida (July 4, 14:37 EDT = 18:37 UTC). Some have speculated that the medium-range missile tests were used as decoys to divert attention from the Taepodong-2 missile. The range of the missile was often estimated to be 6000 km, capable of reaching as far as Alaska. However, analysts in South Korea often put the range at no more than 2,400 miles (or less than 4000 km), which, as far as U.S. interests are concerned, means the missile could reach Guam or possibly the sparsely inhabited western tip of the Aleutian Islands.

East Asian stock markets were shaken by the launches, with investors expressing concerns that moves like this could lead to a future conflict in the Southeast and East Asian areas. Crude oil prices have also risen since the missile tests.

Many experts believe that the timing, which was in the very early hours of July 5 in Korea, but midday of July 4 in the United States when space shuttle Discovery was about to lift off, was deliberate to get attention from the United States, and possibly an attempt for one on one talks rather than the six party talks regarding North Korea's nuclear capabilities.

While at the time western sources viewed the Taepodong-2 test as a missile test, this view later changed. In 2012 the U.S. Department of Defense assessed that the Taepodong-2 had not been deployed as a missile. The Taepodong-2 is the technology base for the Unha space launch vehicle, and was likely not intended as ICBM technology due to its long launch preparation time at a large fixed site.

== Details ==
The table below shows the time for all the seven missiles launched. Of particular interest is the 4th launch, a Taepodong-2 rocket. Reports that the missile flew for only 42 seconds were contradicted by a confidential report by South Korea's National Intelligence Service. They contended, according to a Chosun-Ilbo article published July 6, that instead the missile flew for seven minutes before veering from its trajectory. However, DoD officials indicated that the stable missile boost phase of 42 seconds and the subsequent tumbling out of control to impact into the Sea of Japan was only airborne for close to two minutes.

#	Launch time (July 5, Korean local time = UTC+9 h)	Launch site	Type	Impact time (in minutes)	Impact site
1	03:23/03:33 (= July 4, 18:33 UTC)	Kittaeryong	Scud-C		Sea of Japan
2	04:04	Kittaeryong	Nodong-A		Sea of Japan
3	04:59	Kittaeryong	Scud-C or Nodong-A	07:17	Sea of Japan
4	05:01	Taepodong/Musudan-ri (40.8471°N 129.6285°E)	Taepodong-2	Failed after 42 seconds	Sea of Japan
5	07:12	Kittaeryong	Nodong-A	07:36	Sea of Japan
6^{1}	08:20	Kittaeryong	Scud-C/Nodong-A		Sea of Japan
7	08:22	Kittaeryong	Nodong or Scud	17:28	Sea of Japan

^{1} Reports of the 6th missile are disputed. Source: White House Press Briefing (missiles 1–6) and Japanese Defense Agency and GlobalSecurity.org report.

^{2} Russia claims that North Korea launched 10 missiles.

== Background ==
See also U.S.-North Korea relations, North Korea and weapons of mass destruction, Valiant Shield

North Korea conducted its first nuclear weapons test in 2006, and is widely believed to have a substantial arsenal of chemical weapons, deliverable by artillery against South Korea. North Korea withdrew from the Nuclear Non-Proliferation Treaty in 2003. Recently during "Six-party talks" North Korea agreed in principle to end its nuclear weapons program as part of a comprehensive package of measures to normalize relationships. Diplomatic efforts at resolving the North Korean situation are complicated by the different goals and interests of the nations of the region. While none of the parties desires a North Korea with nuclear weapons, Japan and South Korea are very concerned about North Korean counterstrikes in case of military action against North Korea. China and South Korea are also very worried about the economic and social consequences should this situation cause the DPRK government to collapse.

- On January 10, 2003, North Korea withdrew from the Nuclear Non-Proliferation Treaty.
- In late January 2003, Japan Defense Agency Director Shigeru Ishiba told reporters that if North Korea "begins preparations to attack Japan, for instance by fueling its missiles, we will consider the DPRK is initiating a military attack" and pre-emptively strike missile bases in DPRK.
- On April 24, 2003, the United States, China, and North Korea met in Beijing for trilateral discussions. The United States threatened sanctions against North Korea, which North Korea has said would constitute a "declaration of war".
- On May 12, 2003, North Korea declared the 1992 accord with its southern neighbour nullified, which agreed to keep the Korean peninsula free of nuclear weapons, citing U.S. hostility as a threat to its sovereignty. South Korea considers the accord in effect.
- On August 28, 2003, North Korea announced at six-nation talks in Beijing that it was prepared to "declare itself formally as a nuclear weapons state", and claimed to have the means to deliver nuclear weapons. The North Korean delegation also says the country will soon be carrying out a nuclear test to demonstrate its nuclear capability.
- DPRK announced on February 10, 2005 that it had developed nuclear weapons for its self-defense, and suspended participation in the Six-party talks.
- On September 19, 2005, Six-party talks resulted in an agreement where North Korea agreed to abandon its nuclear weapons program for economic cooperation and assistance, repeating its right to "peaceful uses of nuclear energy", while the U.S. recognized North Korea's sovereignty and stated that it had no intention to attack. The provision of a nuclear light-water reactor would be discussed at "an appropriate time"; the U.S. and North Korea immediately disagreed on when that should be.
- On January 17, 2006, Iran tested a North Korean designed Nodong-B missile.
- In April 2006, North Korea offered to resume talks if the US releases recently frozen North Korean financial assets held in a bank in Macau. The funds were acquired through the sale of drugs and counterfeit U.S. currency.
- In mid-June 2006, North Korea began fueling some of the Taepodong-2 missiles that it possesses.
- On June 14, 2006, the US Air Force conducts a successful unarmed test launch of its Minuteman III intercontinental ballistic missile from Vandenberg Air Force Base to the Marshall Islands, flying approximately 7,700 kilometers in about 30 minutes.
- June 23, 2006 – the US and Japan signed an agreement to jointly produce anti-ballistic missile (ABM) technology and operate surveillance and tracking operations to gather critical data in the case that the DPRK conducted a ballistic missile test. The US agreed to send several batteries of Patriot PAC-3 missiles to protect Okinawa.
- June 30, 2006 – Bush and Japanese Prime Minister Junichiro Koizumi visit Graceland after two days of political talks aimed at cementing relations between Japan and the US.
- July 4, 2006 – Space Shuttle Discovery mission STS-121 launches, in what some North Korea watchers say is no coincidence. . The United States also celebrates its 230th birthday.

Valiant Shield was a large war game conducted by the United States military in the Pacific Ocean in June 2006. The exercise began on June 19, 2006 and lasted for five days, concluding on June 24, 2006. According to the Navy, Valiant Shield focused on cooperation between military branches and on the detection, tracking, and engagement of units at sea, in the air, and on land in response to a wide range of missions. The exercise involved 22,000 personnel, 280 aircraft, and thirty ships, including the supercarriers USS Kitty Hawk, USS Abraham Lincoln, and USS Ronald Reagan. It was the largest military exercise to be conducted by the United States in Pacific waters since the Vietnam War. The exercise marked the first of what will become biennial exercises involving different branches of the U.S. military.

Observers from the Chinese People's Liberation Army Navy were invited to attend, as were naval officers from Singapore, Japan, Australia, South Korea, Russia, Indonesia, and Malaysia. It was the first time observers from China had ever been sent to observe U.S. war games. The PRC sent a ten-person delegation, including one high-ranking officer each from its navy, army, and air force, as well as officials from its foreign ministry. According to USA Today, Chinese military observers said that observing the exercises gave them a better understanding of U.S. weapons and tactics. Rear Admiral Zhang Leiyu, leader of the delegation, called the visit to the war games near Guam "a positive step in China–U.S. military ties".

Military ties between the United States and China have not been close ever since a communist government came to power in China. Admiral William J. Fallon, the top U.S. commander in the Pacific, said it was "a start" that China accepted his invitation to observe the large-scale exercises. Fallon indicated before the exercises began that he expected China to reciprocate. However, neither Zhang, nor the Xinhua News report, gave any indication that such an invitation was forthcoming.

The exercise had implications for other world events as well, including acting as a show of force to possibly deter North Korea from test-firing its new Taepodong-2 missile.

The North Korean missile test came after weeks of speculation that North Korea was poised to launch a missile, but neither their quantity nor their launch site were definitively anticipated. The U.S., Japan, and others warned North Korea prior to the incident that such a test would be construed by those nations as a provocative act. North Korea responded to such words by threatening an "annihilating" nuclear strike if the United States attacks or any other nation preemptively tried to destroy the missile before or after it launched.

The United States Northern Command, NORAD and the Federal Aviation Administration had, in previous days, placed restrictions on commercial and civil flight operations in the areas surrounding Vandenberg Air Force Base, California, and Fort Greely, Alaska, homes of U.S. Interceptor missiles.

== International response ==
The test came on the heels of the Six-party talks between North Korea, China, Japan, Russia, South Korea and the United States. Asian stocks and currencies slid along with European and United States stocks, while gold, silver, and oil rose amid news of the North Korean missiles.

No country proposed military action in response to the test fire. All calls for action have been diplomatic or economic.

=== Members of the six-party talks ===
==== China ====
On July 5, 2006, the Foreign Ministry of China expressed concern over the North Korean missile tests. Foreign Ministry spokesperson Liu Jianchao repeated calls for calm and restraint from "all parties involved". He pleaded for all sides to refrain from any actions that will further complicate the situation in the Korean Peninsula.

In New York, the Chinese ambassador to the UN said North Korea's missile tests were "regrettable".

==== Japan ====
Prime Minister Junichiro Koizumi was notified of the firings on July 5 at 3:52 am, local time. Top Japanese officials, including Chief Cabinet Secretary Shinzo Abe and Defense Agency chief Fukushiro Nukaga, each were notified at about the same time. By 4:50 am they had met at the prime minister's official residence to discuss a Japanese response. Junichiro Koizumi entered his office at 6:30 am, and U.S. ambassador J. Thomas Schieffer arrived twenty minutes later for discussions.

Meanwhile, Japanese foreign minister Taro Aso held a phone conversation with his American counterpart, Condoleezza Rice, in which they agreed to take up the matter with the UN Security Council. Abe also later announced that Japan would bring the launch issue before the UN Security Council, and it was agreed an emergency session would be held at 1400 GMT.

A few hours following the missile launches, Japan began economic sanctions of North Korea by banning the entry of North Korean officials, ship crews, chartered flights and the only direct passenger link between the two countries, the ferry Mangyongbong-92. Japan's agriculture minister, Shoichi Nakagawa, announced that Japan would not provide food aid to North Korea, and that agricultural trade restrictions between the two countries would be considered.

All Japanese Self-Defense Force branches were set on higher alert.

Shinzo Abe and Taro Aso subsequently talked about Japan's option on attacking bases in foreign soil in public, which were reported as plans for 'pre-emptive' strike and quickly denounced by South Korea and China as being belligerent.

==== Russia ====
According to Russia's Foreign Ministry official representative Mikhail Kaminin, the test-launch is "an act of provocation" which will impede the Six-party talks and further "complicate situation around North Korean nuclear program". [sic]

However, President Putin has been quoted as saying that, while he was disappointed by the test firings, the North Koreans were right in their assertion that they had the legal right to perform such tests.

==== South Korea ====
Unification Minister Lee Jong-Seok convened an emergency meeting to determine the objective of the missile launch, which is expected to prompt the U.S. and its allies to take punitive actions such as harsher economic sanctions against North Korea, ministry officials said. However, on July 17, 2006, Chosunilbo reported that unless further tests are conducted, government is not planning any measures as all of its economic support are within the sanction passed by U.N. Small groups of South Korean citizens set fire to North Korean flags and a picture of North Korean leader Kim Jong-il.

==== United States ====
President Bush was briefed on the activity around 4:40 pm CDT (21:40 UTC). He spoke in the Oval Office on the tests on July 5, 2006 and stated that the tests only "isolated Korea". Bush has said that America would continue to encourage six-party talks, rather than be drawn into one-on-one negotiations with North Korea.

Christopher Hill, the Assistant Secretary of State for East Asian and Pacific Affairs, is set to head to the region on Wednesday, July 5, 2006. National Security Adviser Stephen Hadley described the tests as "provocative behavior". George Bush met Stephen Hadley, defense secretary Donald Rumsfeld, and Secretary of State Condoleezza Rice as the tests were going on. Condoleezza Rice had spoken via phone with four of her counterparts in the six-party talks, including Taro Aso, as mentioned earlier. Condoleezza Rice and Stephen Hadley later met South Korea's national security advisor to discuss the launch.

NORAD was put on heightened alert in the past two weeks and the U.S. Missile Defense Agency told CNN that two missiles for interception of ballistic missiles were activated in California prior to North Korea's launch.

=== Other UN Security Council members ===
==== UN Security Council ====
The U.N. Security Council scheduled an emergency meeting for Wednesday, July 5, 2006. The council members agreed that they should do something about the missile test and that they should meet again later to discuss the possibility of issuing a Council resolution.

Japan, with the support of the United States and the United Kingdom, introduced a measure that would have restricted countries from transferring funds, material, or technology to North Korea. Russia and China, with veto power, resisted the resolution, saying a press statement should be issued. In an informal media conference, Russian UN ambassador Vitaly I. Churkin stated that, rather than sanctions, it may be more appropriate for the President of the United Nations Security Council to issue a condemning statement similar to what was done after the North Korean missile firing in 1998.

==== Argentina ====
Argentina's foreign ministry issued a communique expressing its "serious concern over the missile test launches" and urging the North Korean state to "renew diplomatic dialogue and return to the nuclear non-proliferation treaty". The Argentine ambassador to the UN, and its representative in the UN Security Council, César Mayoral, considered that the missile tests are "threatening world peace and security". The Argentine government has expressed, however, its reluctance to the possibility of imposing economic sanctions, emphasizing instead its desire to find a diplomatic solution to the conflict.

==== United Kingdom and the European Union ====
The UK branded North Korea's actions "irresponsible". Foreign Secretary Margaret Beckett said: "These tests are provocative, and only serve to raise tensions in the region."

The current EU president condemned the 'provocative' missile test. According to it the test places additional strains on the regional stability 'at a time when the unresolved nuclear issue on the Korean Peninsula requires mutual confidence building'.

=== Others ===
==== Australia ====
Australia's Prime Minister John Howard called the test "extremely provocative" and also stated "I hope that what North Korea has done is condemned as provocative not only by Australia and Japan but also by other countries in the six-power group."

Foreign Minister Alexander Downer expressed his displeasure to the North Korean Ambassador to Australia, Chon Jae Hong. Australia cancelled a planned diplomatic visit to North Korea amid the news.

==== Canada ====
Foreign Affairs Minister Peter MacKay added Canada's voice to the world condemnation on Wednesday, calling the launches a "major threat" to stability in the region that undermine efforts to halt the spread of weapons of mass destruction.

MacKay chided Pyongyang for its use of brinkmanship in dealing with the international community.

"Canada believes that such tactics are counterproductive and ultimately destined to fail", he said in a news release posted on the Foreign Affairs Department's website. "Such actions can only diminish North Korea's security, not enhance it."

==== Czech Republic ====
The Czech Ministry of Foreign Affairs expressed its "deep concern" over the tests, describing them as a "serious threat to the international community". It called on North Korea to return to the six-party Talks.

==== Hungary ====
The Ministry of Foreign Affairs of the Republic of Hungary issued this statement on July 5, 2006:

Hungary definitely condemns the missile experiments carried out by the People's Democratic Republic of Korea on the July 4. In our view, this step gravely endangers the stability and the security of the region. We find it an especially unfortunate development that the experiment was carried out in spite of the repeated warning of the international community. North Korea’s step jeopardises the renewal of the six-nation talks set up to solve the North Korean nuclear question. Hungary finds it necessary for the People's Democratic Republic of Korea to terminate its activity aimed at the development of long-range missiles, to respect the self-imposed moratorium on missile experiments and to return to the six-nation talks as a constructive partner as soon as possible.

==== Malaysia ====
Malaysian Foreign Minister Syed Hamid Albar expressed his country's "deep concern" over the tests and urged all parties to show restraint and resume negotiations.

==== New Zealand ====
New Zealand Prime Minister Helen Clark urged the United Nations to bring its full weight to bear on North Korea after it announced it had conducted the underground nuclear test. Clark condemned the test, Clark also said "it will back whatever measures the U.N. Security Council decides on". Winston Peters, the Foreign Minister of New Zealand, condemned North Korea's missile tests on behalf of his government, describing them as showing "wanton disregard" for the warnings issued beforehand by the international community. He expressed his hope that North Korea would "step back now from taking any more rash steps" and resume negotiations.

==== Norway ====
Foreign Minister Jonas Gahr Støre condemned the tests as "highly regrettable" and stated his belief that they further escalate regional tension. He affirmed that Norway continues "to be deeply worried over North Korea's nuclear weapons programme".

==== Philippines ====
President Gloria Macapagal Arroyo condemned the tests, saying that the "world has had enough of weapons of mass destruction", urging the reclusive state to resume six-party talks at once.

In addition, Philippine military and defense officials have said a potential North Korean missile attack against Philippine soil cannot be intercepted, calling for the swift modernization of the Philippine military.

==== Singapore ====
Singaporean representatives, through the foreign ministry, sharply rebuked North Korean officials for launching the missiles, calling it a "provocative move". It warned that any future moves similar to what happened a few days ago will only lead to trouble in the Asian region instead of stability and called on Kim Jong-il to return to six-party talks at once.

==== Sweden ====
Minister of Foreign Affairs Jan Eliasson articulated the regret of the Swedish government and noted that the DPRK ambassador in Stockholm had been summoned to the Foreign Ministry to hear Sweden's "concern over the missile tests and the risk of a nuclear arms race in East Asia".

==== Thailand ====
Thailand's Foreign Minister Kantathi Suphamongkhon expressed concern Wednesday over North Korea's long-range missile test, warning the move will lead to regional distrust and threaten world peace, and he plans to raise the issue with his US counterpart early next week. Mr Kantathi urged the communist country to return to the six-party talks. Thailand has been playing an informal role in the talk to push for the progress of the negotiations among the principal parties – North Korea, South Korea, Japan, China, Russia and the United States.

== See also ==
- List of North Korean missile tests
- Kwangmyŏngsŏng-2 – 2009 rocket launch
- 2009 North Korean missile test – (July 2–5, 2009)
- 1998 North Korean missile test – (August 31, 1998) – Taepodong-1
- 1993 North Korean missile test – (May 29/30, 1993) – Nodong-1
