= 2017 North Korean missile tests =

Throughout 2017, 17 missile tests were conducted by North Korea. These tests ranged in success, and included first tests of the DPRK's new missile, the Hwasong-12, which was the most-tested missile type over the course of the year. 2017's missile tests are especially notable due to the several instances of North Korean missiles passing over Japan, provoking a response from the Japanese government, as well as the test of an ICBM, the range of which prompted an Emergency Debate of the UN Security Council.

== April ==
On April 4, 2017, North Korea launched a Hwasong-12 ballistic missile which reached the Sea of Japan. The test came after a day of celebration for North Korea's Eternal President Kim Il Sung. US Secretary of State Rex Tillerson responded by saying the United States had not changed its stance on North Korea and would not comment further.

On April 15, 2017, a Hwasong-12 missile was launched and failed almost immediately, according to the United States Military and the South Korean Armed Forces. The US National Security Advisor, H.R. McMaster, said "all options are on the table" as possible reactions.

On April 28, 2017, another Hwasong-12 missile was launched from Bukchang in the South Pyeongan province, and failed shortly after liftoff. The missile hit the ground in an industrial area around near the city of Tokchon, causing damage to multiple buildings. This launch occurred only hours after a meeting of the UN Security Council condemned North Korean missile and nuclear testing activities again. US President Donald Trump called this action disrespectful to China.

== May ==
On May 14, 2017, a ballistic missile test was carried out. The Hwasong-12 missile flew for 30 minutes, covering a distance of 700 km (430 mi) and reaching an altitude upwards of 2,000 km (1,200 mi).

== June ==
On June 8, 2017 North Korea fired four anti-ship missiles off its east coast, near the port city of Wonsan.

== July ==
On July 4, 2017 North Korea tested an ICBM. The missile flew for approximately 40 minutes, falling 930 km (580 mi) away from the launch site in the Sea of Japan. The missile, named the Hwasong-14, reached an altitude of 2,802 km (1,741 mi). It is estimated that the missile has the capability of reaching 6,700 km (4,200 mi) on a standard trajectory, meaning that although it would not be capable of reaching the Contiguous United States, it would be able to hit anywhere in Alaska. The test prompted an Emergency Debate of the United Nations Security Council.

On July 28, 2017, North Korea launched an additional ballistic missile from Chagang Province, reaching an altitude of 3,000 km ending up in the Sea of Japan narrowly missing an Air France Flight from Tokyo to Paris. km (1,865 mi). Jeffrey Lewis, researcher at the James Martin Center for Nonproliferation Studies, estimated that the missile could have a range of approximately 10,000 km based on its 45-minute flight time. With this range, the missile could potentially reach major U.S. cities such as Denver and Chicago. This was the fourteenth missile test conducted by North Korea in 2017. As with the missile launched on July 4, this missile was believed to be a Hwasong-14.

== August ==
On August 26, 2017, three short-range missiles were launched around early morning from a site in Gangwon Province, with the second one appearing to have blown up almost immediately while another two flew about 250 km (155 miles) in a north-eastern direction, before crashing in the Sea of Japan.

=== Mid-range launch over Japan ===
The August and September missiles flew a regular trajectory, unlike the missile launched in May which had flown a lofted trajectory

On August 29, 2017, at 5:57 am KST, North Korea launched a Hwasong-12 ballistic missile that passed over Hokkaido, the second largest island of Japan. The missile travelled 2,700 kilometres (1,700 miles) and reached a maximum height of 550 kilometres (340 miles). This was the second successful test flight of the Hwasong-12 missile, following three failed tests.

People living under the missile's flight path received a J-Alert message on their cellphones at 6:02 a.m., four minutes after its launch.

Japanese Prime Minister Shinzo Abe said "a reckless act of launching a missile that flies over our country is an unprecedented, serious and important threat." North Korea had previously carefully avoided sending test missiles over Japan by using highly lofted trajectories, and had sent more recent satellite launches to the south avoiding Japan. The missile was at an altitude of about 500 kilometres (310 miles) over Japan, well into space, and the Japanese military did not attempt to shoot down the missile.

The missile was launched from Pyongyang Sunan International Airport, presumably using a mobile launcher. It reportedly broke into three parts before splashing down in the Pacific Ocean; it is unclear if this was intentional. Given North Korea's geographical position, for a non-lofted test flight at this range there was no other practical alternative to passing over Japan.

This was the fifth time North Korea fired a rocket over the Japanese archipelago, although this launch was the first missile launch, as the previous four were satellite launches or attempts.

== September ==
On September 15 at about 6:30am KST, North Korea fired a Hwasong-12 missile from the Pyongyang International Airport, which, for a second time, overflew Hokkaido, Japan. The missile traveled 3,700 kilometres (2,300 miles) and reached a maximum height of 770 kilometres (480 miles); this is the furthest distance any North Korean IRBM missile has ever reached.

North Korean rockets flown over the Japanese archipelago
No.	Date	Model	Area flown over	Advance notice	North Korean claim	Satellite name
1	31 August 1998	Taepodong-1	Akita	No	Satellite launch	Kwangmyŏngsŏng-1
2	5 April 2009	Unha-2	Akita, Iwate	Yes	Satellite launch	Kwangmyŏngsŏng-2
3	12 December 2012	Unha-3	Okinawa	Yes	Satellite launch	Kwangmyŏngsŏng-3
4	7 February 2016	Kwangmyŏngsŏng (Unha-3)	Okinawa	Yes	Satellite launch	Kwangmyŏngsŏng-4
5	29 August 2017	Hwasong-12	Hokkaido	No	Missile launch	N/A
6	15 September 2017	Hwasong-12	Hokkaido	No	Missile launch	N/A
7	4 October 2022	Hwasong-12 modified	Aomori	No	Missile launch	

North Korean rockets flown over the Japanese archipelago

== November ==
On November 28, North Korea launched another ballistic missile, a Hwasong-15, the first in over two months. The missile was said to have reached an altitude of 4,500 km and landed near Japan's exclusive economic zone. According to Yonhap News, Korean Air flights KE026 and KE012 witnessed lights presumably from separated portions of the missile.

== See also ==
- 2017 North Korean crisis
- 2017 in North Korea
- Korean conflict
- Korean reunification
