= Kwangmyŏngsŏng-3 =

North Korean Earth observation satellite

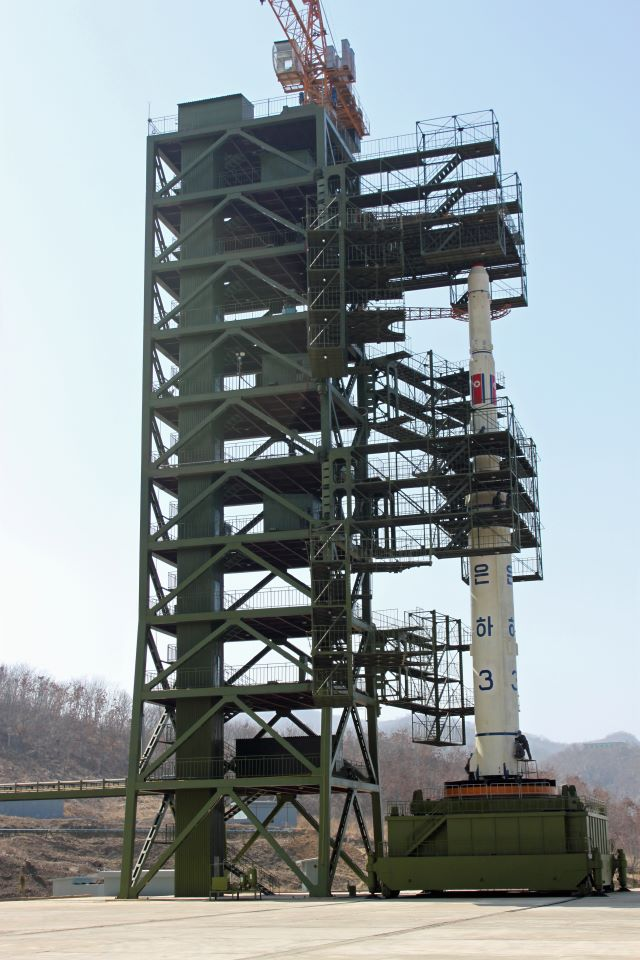
- Mission type: Earth observation Weather forecasting Technology demonstration
- Operator: KCST
- Mission duration: 2 years (planned); Failed to orbit

Spacecraft properties
- Manufacturer: Institute of Military Electronics
- Launch mass: ~100 kilograms (200 lb)

Start of mission
- Launch date: 12 April 2012, 22:38:55 UTC
- Rocket: Unha-3
- Launch site: Sohae

Orbital parameters
- Reference system: Geocentric
- Regime: Sun-synchronous
- Perigee altitude: 500 kilometres (300 mi)
- Apogee altitude: 500 kilometres (300 mi)
- Epoch: Planned

Satellite launches of North Korea. ①: Kwangmyŏngsŏng-1 ②: Kwangmyŏngsŏng-2 ③: Kwangmyŏngsŏng-3 ④: Kwangmyŏngsŏng-4

Kwangmyŏngsŏng-3 (Korean: 광명성 3호; lit. 'Bright Star-3 or Lode Star-3') was a North Korean Earth observation satellite which, according to the DPRK, was for weather forecast purposes, and whose launch was widely portrayed in the West to be a veiled ballistic missile test. The satellite was launched on 13 April 2012 at 07:39 KST aboard the Unha-3 carrier rocket from Sohae Satellite Launching Station. The rocket exploded 90 seconds after launch near the end of the firing of the first stage of the rocket. The launch was planned to mark the centenary of the birth of Kim Il Sung, the founder of the republic. On 1 December 2012 North Korea announced that a replacement satellite would be launched between 10 and 22 December 2012. After a delay and extending the launch window to 29 December, the rocket was launched on 12 December 2012 (39026, 280km x 280km, 97 (2023).).

== Etymology ==
The name "Kwangmyŏngsŏng" is richly symbolic for North Korean nationalism and the Kim family cult. Even though the late North Korean leader Kim Jong Il was born in the village of Vyatskoye near Khabarovsk in the Russian Far East, DPRK sources claim Kim was born on Mount Paektu, and on that day a bright lode star (kwangmyŏngsŏng) appeared in the sky, so everyone knew a new general had been born.

== Pre-launch announcement ==
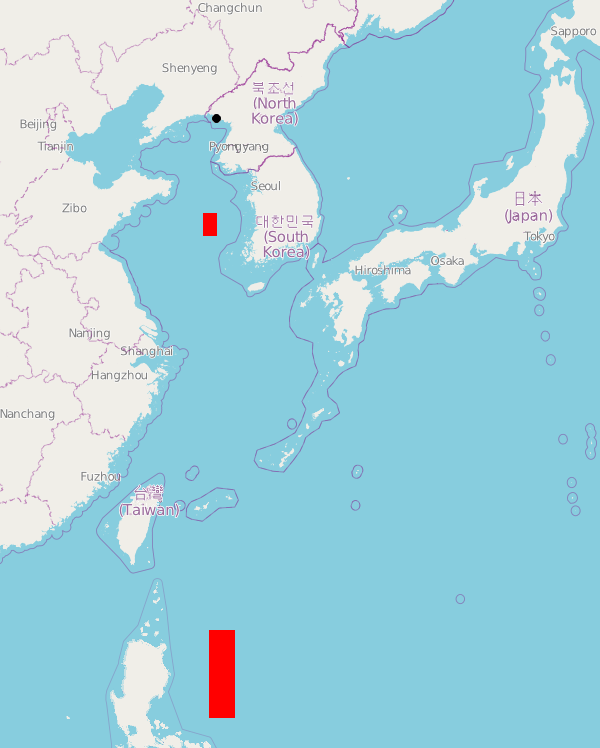
Launch site and "No sail, no fly zone", preliminarily announced by the North Korean government where the rocket's debris was expected to fall.

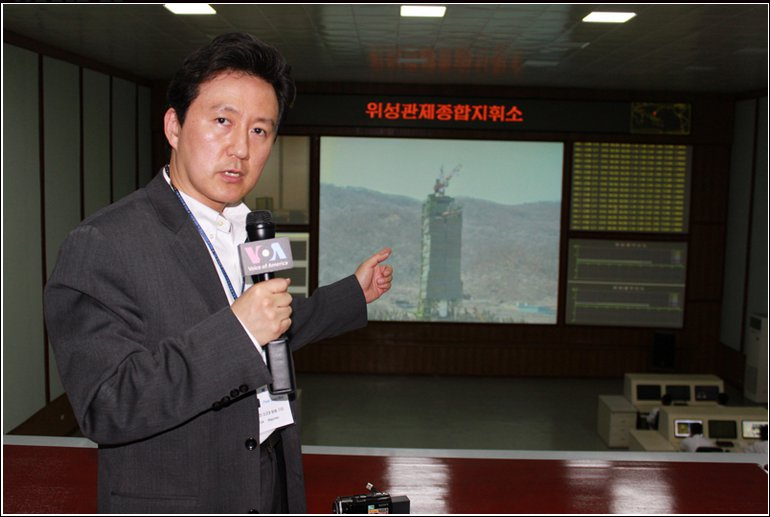
VOA reporter Sungwon Baik inside the control center prior to launch.

On 16 March 2012, the Korean Central News Agency reported that the Korean Committee of Space Technology announced that Kwangmyongsong-3 was to be launched to mark the centenary of Kim Il Sung's birth. In the same announcement it was said that the launch would be made southwards and debris generated from the flight would not impact neighbouring countries. On 17 March the North Korean government invited foreign experts and journalists to observe a satellite launch. The Russian Federal Space Agency (Roscosmos) was officially invited to the launch on 21 March by the North Korean Embassy to Russia but Roscosmos's spokesman said Russia refused to dispatch its experts to the launch because it violated a UN Security Council resolution. Japan Aerospace Exploration Agency had rejected the invitation to send observers to the rocket launch; government spokesman Osamu Fujimura said "It is inappropriate that any Japanese officials participate in observing the launch".

The main newspaper, Rodong Sinmun, said the rocket would take a "safer" flight path compared to previous launches which had strayed into Japanese airspace. The North's official news agency said it had told the International Civil Aviation Organization, the International Maritime Organization, the International Telecommunication Union and other bodies about the upcoming launch. The government said the satellite would broadcast remote sensing data in the UHF band and video in the X-band.

A few days later, an article released by the Korean Central News Agency stressed that "the peaceful development and use of space is a universally recognized legitimate right of a sovereign state. The satellite launch for scientific researches into the peaceful development and use of space and economic development can by no means be a monopoly of specified countries".

== International response to the announcement ==
=== States ===
- Australia – Australian Foreign Minister Bob Carr said that the launch would be a clear breach of the UN Security Council Resolutions and would undermine pledges that North Korea made in recent talks with the US. He also said that "North Korea's nuclear and long-range missile programs present a real and credible threat to the security of the region, and to Australia."
- Bulgaria – Foreign Ministry spokesperson Vesela Cherneva urged North Korea to reconsider its decision and to adhere to the moratorium on nuclear and missile testing.
- Cambodia – Foreign Minister Hor Namhong suggested the six-party nations discuss North Korean nuclear issues at the Asean Regional Forum in Cambodia in July.
- Canada – After the launch, Foreign Affairs Minister John Baird condemned the launch, stating, "Canada unreservedly condemns North Korea's rocket launch of earlier today. This type of brazen behaviour is entirely reckless and provocative. It ignores not only international will but also the basic needs of the North Korean people. While the average North Korean starves and struggles, the country's rulers squander scarce internal resources and external goodwill. Actions like today's will only further isolate this rogue regime and keep North Koreans from the better, brighter existence they deserve but are being denied by those in power. Canada will continue to work with its international partners with a view to securing peace and prosperity on the entire Korean peninsula."
- People's Republic of China – In a press briefing Chinese Foreign Ministry spokesman Liu Weimin said "The Chinese side has taken note of the information released by the DPRK". He called on all parties concerned to play constructive roles saying "To maintain the peace and stability of the Korean peninsula and Northeast Asia is not only in the common interests of all sides concerned, but also the shared aspiration of the international community".
- France – The French Foreign Ministry called the move a provocation and said North Korea "must abandon" plans to launch a rocket to put a satellite into orbit next month, because doing so would violate the terms of UN Security Council resolutions. It said the launching of a rocket by North Korea would contribute to the development of its ballistic missile capabilities.
- India – India's foreign ministry secretary Sanjay Singh said "Nothing should be done which could increase tensions in the region". In a joint statement after their parleys, Prime Minister Manmohan Singh and South Korean President Lee Myung-bak called for maintaining peace and stability in the peninsula including its denuclearization.
- Indonesia – Foreign Minister Marty Natalegawa called on North Korea to refrain from the launch saying "We are obviously deeply concerned by the prospect of the launch of the satellite, both in terms of the safety and security issues, but most of all, and not least, in terms of the disruption it is causing to the conditions conducive for the resumptions of six party talks".
- Japan – Japan urged Pyongyang to abandon the launch, calling it a violation of a UN resolution restricting the North's use of ballistic missile technology. On Monday, 19 March, Japanese Defence Minister Naoki Tanaka said he might order the military to destroy a North Korean rocket if it passes through the country's airspace. On 20 March, NHK, a state-owned TV station, said Japan will deploy missile intercept. On 31 March, it was reported that Japanese destroyer Kirishima left the Yokosuka naval base in Kanagawa Prefecture for the East China Sea ahead of a planned rocket launch.
- New Zealand – Minister of Foreign Affairs Murray McCully urged North Korea to abandon its plan to launch a satellite and also called on North Korea to work with international community and stop its nuclear programme, stating: "The government has been cautiously optimistic about North Korea's recent agreement with the United States to put a moratorium on long-range missile launches and this latest announcement from North Korea is therefore very disappointing. The use of ballistic missile technology to conduct the proposed launch is inconsistent both with that agreement and with UN Security Council resolutions."
- Philippines – The Philippines Department of Foreign Affairs expressed "grave concerns" over the planned launch, which it said was "unacceptable". The Philippines also cited the UN resolutions imposed on North Korea concerning the prohibitions on ballistic missile technology use and the abandonment of the North Korean ballistic missile program. Furthermore, it stated that "North Korea's return to confidence-building and engagement with the international community is key to the continued stability and prosperity of the Korean Peninsula and the entire Asia-Pacific region". A few days later, in a speech during the inauguration of the Filipino veterans of the Korean War memorial hall, President Aquino described the action as a "provocation" and urged North Korea not to proceed with the planned launch. Aquino said the launch increases tensions in the region, and that debris from the launch may land in Philippine territory.
- Poland – A Polish Foreign Ministry statement said "Such action could be interpreted as a breach of the moratorium on missile tests recently announced by Pyongyang, and called North Korea to abide by UN Security Council Resolutions 1718 and 1874 and refrain from steps, which could undermine the recent efforts to restore dialogue."
- Romania – Romania criticised the North Korean decision to proceed with the launch and asked the North Korean authorities to "refrain from actions that would violate UNSC resolutions or undermine efforts to reestablish trust and cooperation in the region."
- Russia – Russia expressed serious concern over North Korea's plan to launch a satellite and urged Pyongyang not to create hurdles to the revival of six-nation talks over its nuclear programme. A statement released by the Russian Foreign Ministry said "We call on Pyongyang not to put itself in opposition to the international community, to refrain from actions that increase tension in the region and create additional complications for the relaunch of six-sided negotiations about the nuclear issue on the Korean peninsula". On 4 April, Deputy Foreign Minister Sergei Ryabkov said "There should be no place for emotions and we must not instigate a new loop of confrontation" and that the world's reaction to the launch should be "gauged". On 10 April Foreign Ministry spokesman Alexander Lukashevich said Russia considers Pyongyang's decision to launch a scientific rocket to place a satellite in earth orbit as disregarding UN Security Council resolutions. Armed Forces spokesman said Interfax news agency "In case of rejection of North Korea's rocket off course and a threat of falling into Russian territory, Russian Aerospace Defence Forces are ready to shoot down the missile". He said the attention of the Russian military in the North Korean missile launch is due to the fact that the trajectory of a missile could pass close to the Russian Federation, and in case of rejection of the rocket can fall on the Kuril Islands.
- South Korea – The South Korean Foreign Ministry expressed 'grave concern' over the planned launch, which it said would be a clear violation of United Nations Security Council Resolution 1874 which bans any launch using ballistic missile technology. Seoul said it would 'closely cooperate' with the US, China, Russia and Japan – the other members of stalled six-party talks over North Korea's nuclear weapons programme so that North Korea ceases such a provocative action.
- United Kingdom – A British Foreign Office spokesperson said: "We have seen the North Korean official government announcement that it plans to launch a satellite between 12 and 16 April. We are deeply concerned that such a launch would undermine North Korea's recent efforts to engage with the international community. We urge the North Korean Government to abide by its obligations under UN Security Council Resolutions 1718 and 1874."
- United States – The US condemned the announcement as "highly provocative" and a direct violation of Pyongyang's international obligations. The State Department noted that UN Security Council Resolutions 1718 and 1874 banned launches using ballistic missile technology. It added that the planned launch would pose a threat to regional security and be inconsistent with Pyongyang's recent undertaking to refrain from long-range missile launches.

=== International organizations ===
- European Union – Herman Van Rompuy, president of the European Council, said the European Union is "gravely concerned" about North Korea's nuclear weapons programme and "deeply worried" by its plans to launch a satellite to mark the centenary of former leader Kim Il Sung's birth. He also added that "The EU has consistently supported the goal of complete and verifiable denuclearisation of the Korean peninsula. We are therefore deeply worried by the announcement on 16 March of the plans for a satellite launch by North Korea. We urge North Korea to refrain from any destabilising act and that it fully abides by its obligations under the relevant United Nations Security Council resolutions and other agreements."
- United Nations – UN Secretary-General Ban Ki-moon said he is "seriously concerned" about the satellite launch and called on Pyongyang to fully comply with the UN resolutions that ban any launch using ballistic missile technology.

== Media coverage ==
Unlike North Korea's previous launches which were very secretive and without foreign media coverage, officials from foreign media companies were invited to Kwangmyŏngsŏng-3. According to KCNA report, a total of 21 foreign media companies, including major worldwide services and television broadcasters such as the Associated Press, CNN and NBC of the United States; Russia's Channel One, NTV and Zvezda; Kyodo News Agency and NHK of Japan; Das Erste of Germany; Agence France-Presse of France; Reuters and BBC of the United Kingdom; South Africa's E.tv, Brazil's Estado de São Paulo, Libya's Libya TV and Malaysia's TV1 have sent reporters to Pyongyang. On 8 April, journalists were allowed a guided tour of the launch pad.

== Satellite ==
North Korea said the satellite would estimate crop yields and collect weather data as well as assess the country's forest coverage and natural resources. It also said the satellite weighed about 100 kilograms (200 lb) and that its planned lifetime was about two years. Inside a room at the launch facility, reporters were allowed to see the satellite.

== Launch and failure ==
In the United States, Acting Assistant Secretary of Defense for Asia-Pacific Security Affairs Peter Lavoy told the House Armed Services Committee that North Korea had indicated the rocket would be launched southward, but said that the US lacked confidence about the rocket's stability and where debris might impact. He said it was probably intended to land somewhere close to the Philippines or maybe Indonesia. He added that South Korea and the Japanese island of Okinawa could also be affected and that the debris could fall on their countries and cause casualties.

Air-traffic control authorities in North and South Korea issued warnings to aircraft associated with North Korea's planned rocket launch. The warnings followed a message issued one week earlier by authorities in the Philippines concerning restrictions on airspace during the 12–16 April 2012 launch window. North Korea's authorities closed a route that runs across the sky to the south of the Sohae launch facility between two navigation waypoints named "BODOK" and "TOMUK".

On Friday, 23 March 2012, Pyongyang's foreign ministry spokesman said preparations for the rocket launch "have entered a full-fledged stage of action". On 26 March 2012 it was reported that the rocket was moved to a launch pad in the Sohae Launching Station using a train. The provider of high resolution satellite imagery DigitalGlobe took a photo on Wednesday, 28 March, showing what appears to be trucks near the North Korean launch pad, while a crane arm on the tower had been swung wide. A day later, on 29 March, it was reported North Korea had begun filling the rocket with liquid fuel. An analysis provided to the Associated Press by the US-Korea Institute at Johns Hopkins School of Advanced International Studies on 5 April asserted that evidence suggests the first stage might be in the launch stand's closed gantry ahead of the planned launch on 12–16 April: the evidence, contained in satellite photos taken on 4 April, suggested the completion of fuelling activity, with most of the empty fuel and oxidizer tanks removed from buildings supplying the first stage, a new barricade for vehicles on the road to the pad indicating higher security, and the removal of objects near the gantry and a clean-up of the launch pad. On 10 April North Ryu Kum Chol, deputy director of the Space Development Department of the Korean Committee for Space Technology told reporters at a news conference in Yanggakdo Hotel, Pyongyang, that the launch of the three-stage rocket was on target to take place between 12 and 16 April and that all the assembly and preparations of the satellite launch were done, including fueling of the rocket. On 11 April 2012, Paek Chang Ho, head of the General Satellite Control Center, briefed journalists inside the center on Pyongyang's outskirts about the coming launch.

Lift-off was postponed on 12 April 2012 due to bad weather.

On 13 April 2012 at 07:38:55 KST, lift-off occurred. Ninety seconds later the rocket exploded and crashed into the Yellow Sea near Gunsan, South Korea.

North Korean rockets flown over the Japanese archipelago
No.	Date	Model	Area flown over	Advance notice	North Korean claim	Satellite name
1	31 August 1998	Taepodong-1	Akita	No	Satellite launch	Kwangmyŏngsŏng-1
2	5 April 2009	Unha-2	Akita, Iwate	Yes	Satellite launch	Kwangmyŏngsŏng-2
3	12 December 2012	Unha-3	Okinawa	Yes	Satellite launch	Kwangmyŏngsŏng-3
4	7 February 2016	Kwangmyŏngsŏng (Unha-3)	Okinawa	Yes	Satellite launch	Kwangmyŏngsŏng-4
5	29 August 2017	Hwasong-12	Hokkaido	No	Missile launch	N/A
6	15 September 2017	Hwasong-12	Hokkaido	No	Missile launch	N/A
7	4 October 2022	Hwasong-12 modified	Aomori	No	Missile launch	

== Reaction to the launch ==
=== North Korea ===
The Korean Central News Agency released a news report on the launch:

Pyongyang, April 13 (KCNA) – The DPRK launched its first application satellite Kwangmyongsong-3 at the Sohae Satellite Launching Station in Cholsan County, North Phyongan Province at 07:38:55 a.m. on Friday.

The earth observation satellite failed to enter its preset orbit.

Scientists, technicians and experts are now looking into the cause of the failure.

— KCNA

The same news report was aired in the Korean Central Television. Following the failure, a hastily assembled official press conference on the rocket was suddenly cancelled on Friday morning; close to noon, handlers moved the press corps onto buses under high security. Expectations were that the government would make an official statement on the rocket launch's failure and give closure to the day's highly public embarrassment. The fanfare instead turned out to be in honor of a new, approximately 25-meter tall bronze statue of Kim Jong Il, North Korea's late leader and father to Kim Jong Un, the country's 29-year-old First Secretary. More than 100,000 North Koreans came out for a government-organized celebration on Friday evening with bright costumes, flags and flowers to celebrate the unveiling of the monument.

On 17 April, the Korean Central News Agency released a report on North Korea to continue launching satellites which would be used for "peaceful purposes" and further launches are to include geostationary satellites.

Secondly, we will continue exercising the independent right to use space recognized by the universally accepted international laws which are above the UNSC resolutions.

We will expand and strengthen space development institutions and continue launching a variety of working satellites needed for economic development of the country including geostationary satellites under the state plan for space development.

Nothing can stand in the way of the DPRK's space development for peaceful purposes.

— KCNA, Voice of Korea

In the same report, it is stated that North Korea would no longer abide to the 29 February "Leap Day" Agreement, in which North Korea would abandon missile and nuclear tests for food aid, saying that the United States broke the agreement.

Thirdly, as the U.S. violated the Feb. 29 DPRK-U.S. agreement through its undisguised hostile acts, we will no longer be bound to it.

— KCNA, Voice of Korea

=== Other states ===
- Australia – Australia condemned North Korea's failed launch, labelling the manoeuvre "provocative and dangerous". In a joint statement, Prime Minister Julia Gillard and Foreign Affairs Minister Bob Carr said the decision to launch a satellite on a long-range rocket "directly contradicted the most recent assurances received from North Korea and was in open defiance of unanimously adopted United Nations Security Council resolutions".
- Bulgaria – Bulgarian Foreign Ministry expressed regret that North Korea ignored the calls not to launch a rocket, and urged the North Korean government to refrain from actions that would jeopardise regional security.
- People's Republic of China – Chinese Foreign Minister Yang Jiechi expressed concern about the rocket and said Beijing hoped for "restrained actions by the corresponding sides with the aim of preserving stability on the peninsula".
- Germany – German Foreign Minister Guido Westerwelle condemned the launch, saying it was a "violation of international obligations and will increase tensions on the Korean peninsula".
- Hungary – The Ministry of Foreign Affairs of Hungary expressed deep concern about the launch, calling it "a clear violation of UN Security Council Resolution 1874".
- Japan – Defense Minister Naoki Tanaka said "We have confirmed that a certain flying object has been launched and fell after flying for just over a minute, and there was no impact on Japanese territory".
- Romania – The Romanian Ministry of Foreign Affairs expressed "profound concern over the satellite launch by the People's Democratic Republic of Korea, in spite of the messages urging restraint", adding that the launch "constitutes a violation of UN Security Council Resolution 1874 of 2009" and "has an adverse impact on regional stability, peace and security in the region and in the world and is of a nature to affect the process of solving the North Korean nuclear issue."
- Russia – The government of Russia criticized North Korea for its rocket launch on Friday, saying that Pyongyang had defied the UN Security Council and that neighbouring powers all opposed it. In a joint news conference, foreign minister Sergey Lavrov said the UN Security Council must respond to the North Korean launch, which Russia and other nations say violated council sanctions, but suggested trade restrictions or military threats would be counterproductive. Alexander Zheleznyakov from the Tsiolkovsky Academy of Cosmonautics said the failure occurred due to North Korea's primitive missile technology. He said "I think it all happened because of the imperfections of the North Korean technology. I have a few weeks before launch suggested that the launch will fail. In the DPRK, level of missile development is low, which, of course, could affect to this situation. Failure was predictable and predetermined".
- South Korea – Ministry spokesman Kim Min-Seok said "A few minutes after the launch, the rocket disintegrated into several pieces and lost its altitude". South Korea said it was dispatching ships to try to retrieve the rocket, which it said split into 20 fragments as the first and second stages failed to separate.
- United Kingdom – Foreign Secretary William Hague said "I am deeply concerned about the DPRK's satellite launch today. Such a launch uses ballistic missile technology and, as such, is a clear violation of UNSCR 1874. Later today the Permanent Under-Secretary, Simon Fraser, will summon the DPRK Ambassador to the Foreign and Commonwealth Office and make clear that the DPRK can expect a strong response from the international community if it continues to develop its missile and nuclear capabilities. I strongly urge the DPRK to suspend all missile and nuclear-related activity and to commit to re-engaging with the international community."
- United States – White House spokesman Jay Carney said "Despite the failure of its attempted missile launch, North Korea's provocative action threatens regional security, violates international law and contravenes its own recent commitments" and that "While this action is not surprising given North Korea's pattern of aggressive behavior, any missile activity by North Korea is of concern to the international community". The North American Aerospace Defense Command said the first stage fell into the sea west of South Korea, and the remainder was deemed to have failed.
- Vietnam- The government of Vietnam said it hoped for a peaceful, stable and prosperous Korean peninsula. "Vietnam reiterates the necessity of strictly abiding by the resolutions of the United Nation Security Council especially the Resolution 1874 for regional and global peace and stability", said Mr. Nghị, a spokesperson.

=== International organizations ===
- European Union – EU Foreign Affairs Chief Catherine Ashton called it a "clear violation" of a resolution issued by the UN Security Council.
- United Nations – Secretary-General of the United Nations Ban Ki-moon stated that the test was "deplorable as it defies the firm and unanimous stance of the international community".

== See also ==
- Kwangmyŏngsŏng program
- Kwangmyŏngsŏng-1
- Kwangmyŏngsŏng-2
- Kwangmyŏngsŏng-3 Unit 2
- Taepodong-2
