= General Satellite Control Center =

- North Korea
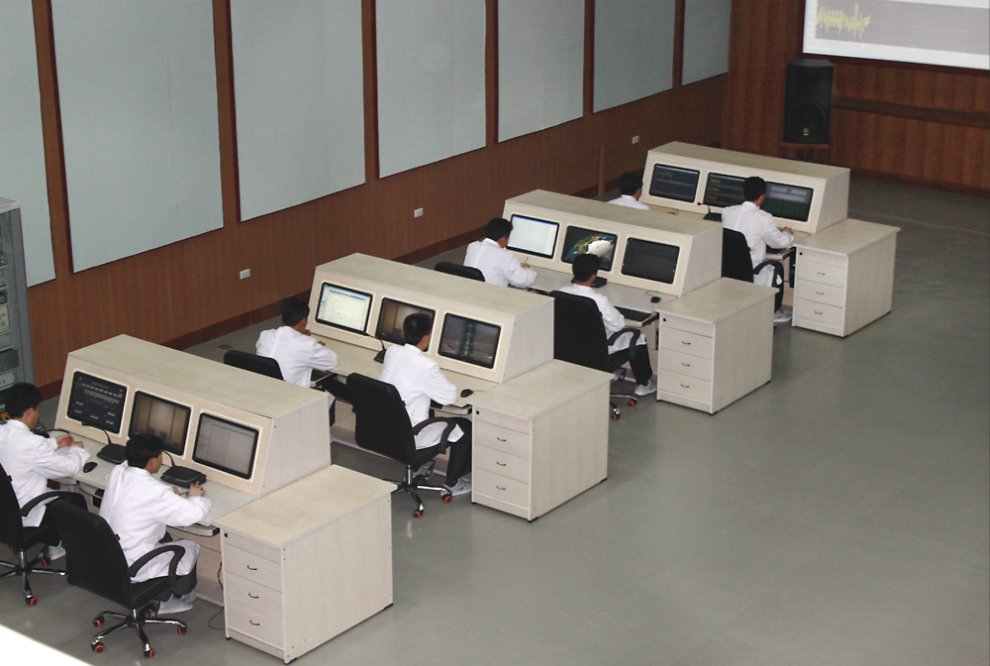
- Technicians at their desks before Kwangmyongsong-3 launch in 2012.

Location
- Coordinates: 39.0425°N 125.7098°E

Site history
- Built: 2000–2005
- Built by: North Korea

The General Satellite Control Center (Korean: 위성관제총합지휘소) is the main mission control center of North Korea's space program. It is located in Pothonggang District, Pyongyang in a two-storey white building, and controlled by the Korean Committee of Space Technology. The mission control center was first shown in 2009 in the KCTV broadcasting announcing the launching of the satellite Kwangmyongsong-2. Late leader Kim Jong Il visited the control center with Kim Jong Un in 2009 before the launch of the Kwangmyongsong-2 satellite.
