= Sohae Satellite Launching Station =

North Korean military facility

- 서해위성발사장
- North Korea
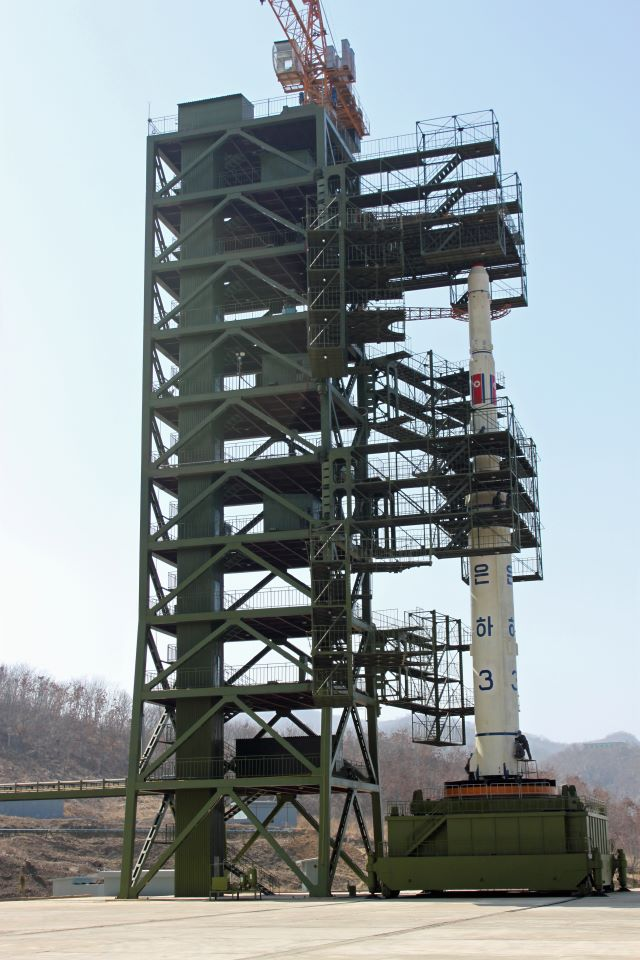
- Unha-3 rocket in the site before launch of Kwangmyŏngsŏng-3.

Site information
- Type: Spaceport
- Status: Active

Location
- Location within North Korea
- Coordinates: 39.660°N 124.705°E

Site history
- Built: 1990s
- Built by: North Korea

Sohae Satellite Launching Station (Korean: 서해위성발사장; MR: Sŏhae Wisŏng Palsajang, also known as Tongch'ang-dong Space Launch Center and Pongdong-ri) is a rocket launching site in Tongch'ang-ri, Cholsan County, North Pyongan Province, North Korea. The base is located among hills close to the northern border with China. The spaceport was built on the site of the village Pongdong-ri which was displaced during construction. It was the site for the 13 April 2012 launch of the North Korean satellite Kwangmyŏngsŏng-3, which was launched to celebrate the 100th anniversary of the birth of Kim Il Sung. The rocket launch failed, but on 12 December of the same year Kwangmyŏngsŏng-3 Unit 2 was successfully launched and brought into Earth orbit.

The launches were controversial as they were dismissed by the US as tests of ballistic missile technology and hence of breach of an agreement made between North Korea and the US in February 2012.

During the 2018 North Korea–United States summit, Kim Jong Un promised that North Korea would destroy a missile engine test stand soon. The site was not initially named but was later identified to be the Sohae Satellite Launching Ground by US officials. This pledge was made official as part of the Pyongyang Declaration which Kim and South Korean leader Moon Jae-in signed at the September 2018 inter-Korean summit. On 31 October 2018, South Korean officials visited the site and confirmed it was being dismantled and ready for an upcoming inspection. But in early 2019, after a summit between North Korea and the U.S. ended without an agreement, North Korea began rebuilding of the site. A test took place in December 2019, which confirmed that the site was once again operational.

== History ==
Signs of construction were visible during the early 1990s and became more pronounced by the early 2000s. A major progress in the construction was discovered in 2008 by Jane's Information Group, which requested imagery from the satellite company DigitalGlobe. Movements from the Sanum’dong missile research factory with the erector transporter and railroad, road transportation to the space center of a prototype Unha-3 class booster first two stages initially took place over 29–31 May 2009 possibly for logistics testing as well as personnel facilities infrastructure testing training purposes. The results of those tests suggest that military and design specialists ultimately decided to build a facilities access railroad to cut down the 15 kilometer road access logistics issues to the space center.

By early 2011 it was reported that the construction was completed and that it had been under construction for a decade. The first official mention of the site took place in March 2012 when North Korea announced it will launch from that site the satellite Kwangmyŏngsŏng-3. In April 2012, prior to the launch of the satellite, Jang Myong-jin, director of the Sohae, introduced the launching process of the Unha-3 during a guided media tour.

The first launch of Kwangmyongsong-3 on 12 April 2012 failed. On 1 December 2012, the Korean Central News Agency announced that a second version of Kwangmyongsong-3 was to be launched from Sohae between 10 and 22 December 2012. North Korea declared the launch successful, and the South Korean military and North American Aerospace Defense Command (NORAD) reported that initial indications suggested that an object had achieved orbit. North Korea had previously claimed the Kwangmyŏngsŏng-1 and Kwangmyŏngsŏng-2 launches successful, despite American military sources confirming that they failed to achieve orbit.

On 7 February 2016, North Korea successfully launched a long-range rocket, carrying the satellite Kwangmyongsong-4, from the station. Critics suggest that the real purpose of the launch was test a ballistic missile. The launch was strongly condemned by the UN Security Council. A statement broadcast on Korean Central Television said that a new Earth observation satellite, Kwangmyongsong-4, had successfully been put into orbit less than 10 minutes after lift-off from the Sohae space centre in North Phyongan province. North Korea's National Aerospace Development Administration stated the launch was "an epochal event in developing the country's science, technology, economy and defence capability by legitimately exercising the right to use space for independent and peaceful purposes". The launch prompted South Korea and the United States to discuss the possibility of placing an advanced missile defence system in South Korea, a move strongly opposed by both China and Russia.

In July 2018, North Korea began dismantling the Sohae Satellite Launching Station. Satellite images taken between 20 and 22 July showed the destruction of a rocket engine test stand used to develop liquid-fuel engines for ballistic missiles, space-launch vehicles and a rail-mounted processing building where space launch vehicles were assembled before being moved to the launch pad Commercial satellite imagery from 3 August 2018 confirmed that additional dismantlement activities were taking place at Sohae as well, including the destruction of facility's vertical engine test stand and fuel/oxidizer bunkers. In September 2018, North Korean leader Kim Jong Un and South Korean leader Moon Jae-in signed the "Pyongyang Joint Declaration of September 2018", which, among other things, pledged for North Korea to complete its dismantlement of Sohae and allow foreign experts to observe the dismantling of the missile engine testing site and a launch pad. By 10 October 2018, commercial satellite imagery confirmed that the site's legacy fuel/oxidizer bunker located at the launch pad had been largely removed. Officials from South Korea's National Intelligence Service who visited the site on 31 October 2018 stated that Sohae was in fact being dismantled and was ready for an upcoming international inspection.

After the U.S.-North Korea summit in February 2019 ended without an agreement, new open-source satellite images showed that the site was undergoing reconstruction and appeared operational. On 7 December 2019, a satellite image obtained by CNN showed activity and the presence of a large shipping container at the facility's engine test stand, which observers said could indicate plans to resume testing engines which are used to power satellite launchers and intercontinental ballistic missiles. The next day, North Korea announced that it had carried out a "very important test" at the site, and said it would play a "significant role" in changing the country's strategic position in the near future.

On 30 May 2023, the first (and failed) orbital launch attempt of Chollima-1 launch vehicle took place with Malligyong-1 reconnaissance satellite, using a newly built pad close to the western coastal area of the site with the third try being successful.

On 27 May 2024, North Korea launched the Malligyong-1-1 military satellite onboard a new launch vehicle using liquid oxygen and petroleum engine. However, the launch failed.

April 2026 satellite imagery pointed to the completion of upgrade and expansion works at the facility. Also, the villages of Jangang-dong and Jangya-dong, located in the vicinity of the facility, were demolished. In May 2026 it was reported that the construction of a new hillside building that may be a VIP viewing stand was ongoing.

== Facilities ==
The entire facility occupies over six square kilometers, and consists of a launch site, a static rocket motor test stand, vehicle checkout and processing buildings, a launch control building, a large support area, a complex headquarters building and an entry control point. The site is five times larger than Tonghae Launch Site. There is much speculation about the functions of different parts of the site but the nuances of satellite photography based guesswork may not be communicated effectively in the mass media.

Western sources identified a building as a "high bay processing facility" which turned out to be the launch control centre when the site was visited by journalists. The building previously identified as the control centre was actually an observation point.

As of May 2023, the site consists of two orbital launch pads:

- The main launch pad, equipped with a gantry tower, that hosted three orbital launch attempts of the Unha-3 launch vehicle (39.6601°N 124.7052°E)
- A more recently built smaller pad used for the test flights of the Chollima-1 launch vehicle (39.6529°N 124.7365°E)

== See also ==
- Tonghae Satellite Launching Ground
- Punggye-ri Nuclear Test Site
- Sinpung-dong Ballistic Missile Operating Base
