= Kwangmyŏngsŏng-3 Unit 2 =

First successful North Korean satellite

- Mission type: Earth observation Meteorology; Technology
- Operator: KCST
- COSPAR ID: 2012-072A
- SATCAT no.: 39026
- Mission duration: 2 years (planned)

Spacecraft properties
- Manufacturer: Institute of Military Electronics
- Dry mass: 100 kilograms (220 lb)

Start of mission
- Launch date: 12 December 2012, 00:49 UTC
- Rocket: Unha-3
- Launch site: Sohae

End of mission
- Last contact: 12 December 2012
- Decay date: 16 September 2023

Orbital parameters
- Reference system: Geocentric
- Regime: Low Earth
- Semi-major axis: 6,921 kilometres (4,301 mi)
- Eccentricity: 0.0065
- Perigee altitude: 498 kilometres (309 mi)
- Apogee altitude: 581 kilometres (361 mi)
- Inclination: 97.41 degrees
- Period: 95.43 minutes
- Epoch: 14 December 2012

- Korean name
- Chosŏn'gŭl: 《광명성―3》호 2호기
- Hancha: 光明星3號2號機
- Literal meaning: Lodestar-3 Unit 2
- Revised Romanization: Gwangmyeongseong-3 ho 2-hogi
- McCune–Reischauer: Kwangmyŏngsŏng-3 ho 2-hogi

Kwangmyŏngsŏng-3 Unit 2 (Note: Abbreviated as KMS 3-2.) (Korean: 《광명성―3》호 2호기; lit. 'Lodestar-3 Unit 2') was the first satellite successfully launched from North Korea, an Earth observation spacecraft that was launched on 12 December 2012, 00:49 UTC, in order to replace the original Kwangmyŏngsŏng-3, which failed to reach orbit on 13 April 2012. The United Nations Security Council condemned the satellite launch, regarding it as a violation of the ban on North Korean ballistic missile tests, as the rocket technology is the same.

The launch came during the period when the DPRK was commemorating the first anniversary of the death of former leader Kim Jong Il and just before the first South Korean domestic launch of a satellite and the South Korean presidential election on 19 December 2012. The successful launch makes the DPRK the tenth space power capable of putting satellites in orbit using its own launch vehicles.

North Korea declared the launch successful, and the South Korean military and North American Aerospace Defense Command (NORAD) reported that initial indications suggested that an object had achieved orbit. North Korea had previously claimed the Kwangmyŏngsŏng-1 and Kwangmyŏngsŏng-2 launches as successful, despite American military sources claiming that they failed to achieve orbit.

Several days after the launch, Western sources stated that, while the satellite had indeed initially achieved orbit, it now seemed to be tumbling, and was probably out of control.

== Etymology ==
The name "Kwangmyŏngsŏng" is richly symbolic for North Korean nationalism and the Kim family cult. While Soviet records recount that the late North Korean leader Kim Jong Il was born in the village of Vyatskoye near Khabarovsk in the Russian Far East, North Korean internal sources claim that Kim was born on Mount Baekdu and that on that day a bright lodestar ("kwangmyŏngsŏng") appeared in the sky.

== Background ==
The launch of Kwangmyŏngsŏng-3 Unit 2 was the fourth North Korean attempt to orbit a satellite, and North Korea claimed that two of the previous launches had placed their payloads into orbit despite several other countries confirming that the launches had failed, and no independent confirmation that the satellite was in orbit. The first attempt occurred in August 1998, with a Paektusan-1 carrier rocket attempting to launch Kwangmyŏngsŏng-1; the second occurred in April 2009 with Kwangmyŏngsŏng-2, and the third in April 2012 with the original Kwangmyŏngsŏng-3. The April 2012 launch was the only one which North Korea acknowledged to have failed. The rocket was largely made using domestically produced parts and technology; this ability is seen as cause for greater concern over North Korea's ability to develop ballistic missile technology despite sanctions.

== Pre-launch announcement ==
The launch was announced on 1 December 2012, when the Korean Central News Agency reported that the Korean Committee of Space Technology informed them that they "[plan] to launch another working satellite, second version of Kwangmyŏngsŏng-3, manufactured by its own efforts and with its own technology, true to the behests of leader Kim Jong-il," with a prospective launch window of 10–22 December 2012 given. The launcher splashdown zones were reported to the International Maritime Organization, indicating a polar orbit was intended.

On 8 December 2012, KCNA reported that the KCST answered the "question raised by KCNA, as regards the launch of the second version of Kwangmyŏngsŏng-3 satellite" and also reported that the launch period was extended to 29 December 2012.

== Satellite ==
North Korea claims the satellite would estimate crop yields and collect weather data as well as assess the country's forest coverage and natural resources. The country also claims that the satellite weighed about 100 kg (220 lbs) and that its planned lifetime was about two years.

The satellite decayed on 16 September 2023.

== Launch ==
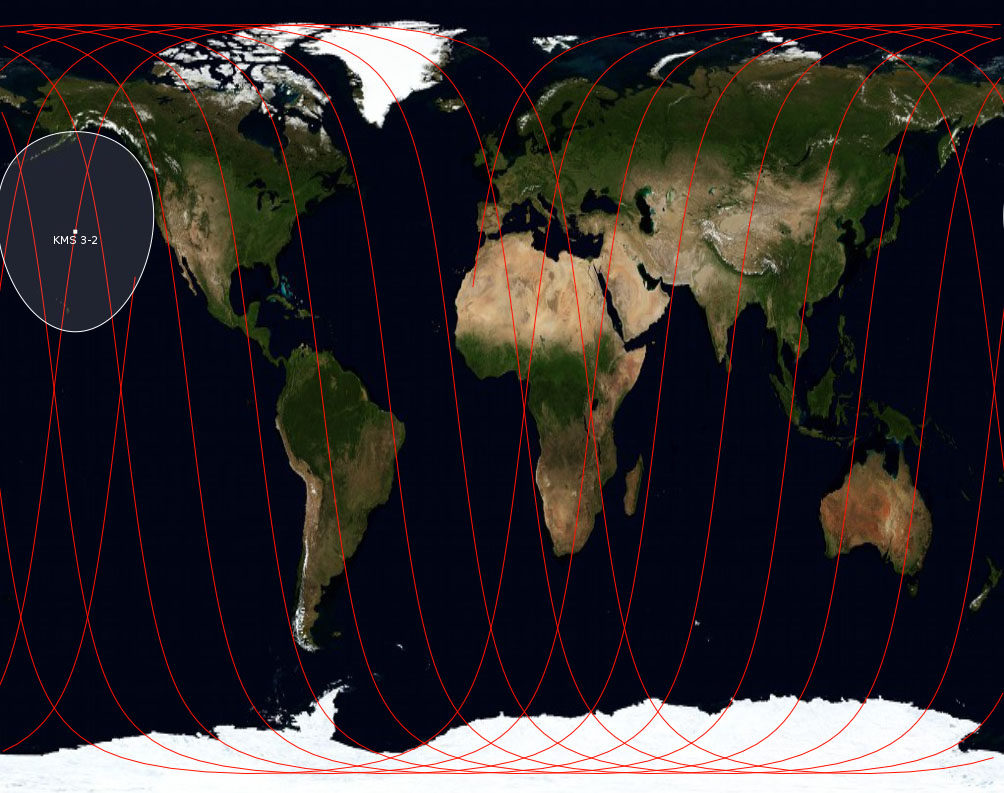
Satellite ground track of Kwangmyŏngsŏng-3 Unit 2, 14 December 2012

On 12 December 2012, Kwangmyŏngsŏng-3 was launched from the Sohae Satellite Launching Ground at 00:49:46 UTC (09:49 KST). The North American Aerospace Defense Command was able to track the rocket at this time. The first stage impacted the ocean 200 kilometres (120 mi) off the west coast of South Korea at 00:58, with the fairing coming down one minute later 100 kilometres (62 mi) downrange. At 01:01, the rocket flew over Okinawa, with the second stage impacting 300 kilometres (190 mi) east of the Philippines four minutes later. During the ascent the rocket performed a dog-leg manoeuvre to increase its inclination sufficiently to attain Sun-synchronous orbit.

The satellite was deployed into a Sun-synchronous polar orbit with an apogee of 584 kilometres (363 mi), a perigee of 499 kilometres (310 mi), 97.4 degrees of orbital inclination, and an orbital period of 95 minutes and 29 seconds. The spacecraft separated from the rocket's third stage at 00:59:13; nine minutes and 27 seconds after liftoff.

The U.S. Space Command began to track three objects from the launch, giving Kwangmyŏngsŏng-3 the Satellite Catalog Number 39026 and the international designator 2012-072A. They later began tracking a fourth object that was related to the launch.

The following day, U.S. officials tracking the satellite reported that it appeared to be "tumbling out of control" in its orbit. However North Korean sources said that the satellite was orbiting normally. Data collected by Spain, Italy and United Kingdom suggest the brightness of the satellite has been fluctuating, which indicates it is tumbling as it orbits.

=== Examination ===
South Korean missile experts examined components of the missile from the two stages of the rocket that fell back to Earth. Initially they reported the components were of poor quality and some foreign made. Further examination revealed that most of the components were produced domestically in North Korea. They were effective for the launch, but found mostly to be crude, unreliable, and inefficient. The rocket design was based on older technologies of the 1960s and 70s. The design of the rocket engine was almost identical to one built in Iran.

== Reaction ==
At noon local time, the Korean Central News Agency released a news report on the launch:

Pyongyang, 12 December (KCNA) – The second version of satellite Kwangmyŏngsŏng-3 successfully lifted off from the Sohae Space Center in Cholsan County, North Phyongan Province by carrier rocket Unha-3 on Wednesday. The satellite entered its preset orbit.

— KCNA

The report was followed by a more detailed report later in the afternoon stating:

Scientists and technicians of the DPRK successfully launched the second version of satellite Kwangmyŏngsŏng-3 into its orbit by carrier rocket Unha-3, true to the last instructions of leader Kim Jong Il.

Carrier rocket Unha-3 with the second version of satellite Kwangmyŏngsŏng-3 atop blasted off from the Sohae Space Center in Cholsan County, North Phyongan Province at 09:49:46 on 12 December, Juche 101(2012). The satellite entered its preset orbit at 09:59:13, 9 minutes and 27 seconds after the lift-off.

The satellite is going round the polar orbit at 499.7 km perigee altitude and 584.18 km apogee altitude at the angle of inclination of 97.4 degrees. Its cycle is 95 minutes and 29 seconds.

The scientific and technological satellite is fitted with survey and communications devices essential for the observation of the earth.

The successful launch of the satellite is a proud fruition of the Workers' Party of Korea's policy of attaching importance to the science and technology. It is also an event of great turn in developing the country's science, technology and economy by fully exercising the independent right to use space for peaceful purposes.

At a time when great yearnings and reverence for Kim Jong Il pervade the whole country, its scientists and technicians brilliantly carried out his behests to launch a scientific and technological satellite in 2012, the year marking the 100th birth anniversary of President Kim Il Sung.

— KCNA

On 20 December, the Korean Central Television aired a 27-minute documentary titled "Successful Launch of Kwangmyongsong 3-2 under the Leadership of Dear Respected Marshal Kim Jong Un". The documentary showed footage of the preparations for the rocket launch and how Kim Jong Un was involved in the preparations.

=== Internal celebrations ===
Government vans with loudspeakers brought the news of the launch of Kwangmyŏngsŏng-3 to Pyongyang soon after the launch. On 14 December state television in North Korea broadcast images of hundreds of thousands of people celebrating the successful launch in Pyongyang's central square, while military and scientific personnel gave speeches.

According to the news report, after achieving orbit with Kwangmyŏngsŏng-3, Kim Jong Un had ordered more satellite launches.

=== International response ===
==== Countries ====
- Australia – Prime minister Julia Gillard labelled the launch as a "provocative and irresponsible act", and a violation of United Nations Security Council resolutions.
- Brazil – The Itamaraty issued a statement condemning the rocket launch and called for North Korea to "comply in full with the applicable resolutions of the U.N. Security Council" and asked for the resuming of negotiations "on peace and security in the Korean Peninsula".
- Bulgaria – The Foreign ministry described the launch as "a clear violation of the international obligations of the DPRK" and urged North Korea to refrain from further actions that could lead to the "isolation of the country".
- Canada – Canada condemned the missile launch, and Foreign Affairs Minister John Baird stated that North Korea's actions "clearly demonstrate its wilful defiance of its international obligations". He also added that the regime has shown disregard for its people by funding military and nuclear programs before providing basic necessities for its citizens.
- China – The Foreign ministry expressed concerns and "hope[d] parties concerned can take a long-term perspective, deal with this calmly and appropriately, avoid taking actions that may further escalate the situation, and jointly maintain the peace and stability on the Korean Peninsula and in the region as a whole."
- Colombia – Colombia, in consonance with the United Nations Security Council, being a non-permanent member on the time of the launch, and having ratified the Treaty on the Non-Proliferation of Nuclear Weapons, condemned the launch of the rocket Unha-3 executed by the DPRK via a press release from the Ministry of Foreign Affairs. Colombia also noted that "the DPRK breaches the resolution 1718 of 2006 as well as 1874 of 2009," and urged it to comply with the resolutions, adding, "such act affects the stability in the Korean Peninsula as well as international peace and security."
- Hungary – The Ministry of Foreign Affairs was deeply concerned about the implemented rocket launch. The launching was considered a clear violation of the country's international obligations and UN Security Council Resolution 1718 and 1874. Hungary called upon the DPRK to abide by its international obligations especially as it is defined by the relevant UN Security Council Resolutions. Hungary also urged the DPRK to refrain from any destabilising actions that could have further increased tensions in the region.
- India – India's Ministry of External Affairs condemned the launch, saying it was concerned that 'unwarranted action' by North Korea would impact the stability of the whole peninsula, and noting that it was a violation of U.N. Security Council Resolution 1874.
- Iran – General Masoud Jazaeri, a senior military official, congratulated North Korea on the launch, saying that "experience has shown that independent countries, by self-confidence and perseverance, can quickly reach the height of self-sufficiency in science and technology. Hegemonic powers, such as the United States, are unable to stop the progress of such countries."
- Japan – Government spokesman Osamu Fujimura condemned the launch, saying that "it is extremely regrettable that North Korea went through with the launch despite our calls to exercise restraint. Our country cannot tolerate this. We strongly protest to North Korea."
- Philippines – The Department of Foreign Affairs condemned the launch, stating that the decision was in "clear violation" of three UN Security Council resolutions which "explicitly demanded the country not to use or conduct any launch using ballistic missile technology and the suspension of its ballistic missile program."
- Romania – The Ministry of Foreign Affairs strongly condemned the launch, stating that North Korea "blatantly encroached upon the UN Security Council resolutions" and adding that "Romania, throughout its mandate of Local Representation of the EU in Pyongyang in the second half of 2012, has repeatedly conveyed messages to the DPRK authorities [...] demanding that Pyongyang refrain from any action affecting peace and security in North-East Asia."
- Russian Federation – The Foreign ministry released a statement stating "The new rocket launch carried out by North Korea [flouts] the opinion of the international community, including calls from the Russian side, and leaves us with deep regret." Russian Defense Ministry said its early missile warning systems had tracked the rocket launch along a southern trajectory, the Interfax-AVN military news agency reported.
- South Korea – Foreign Minister Kim Sung-hwan strongly denounced the launch, saying that "North Korea ignored repeated warnings and demands by the international community" and that "it should bear grave responsibility for the launch as the U.N. Security Council warned with its presidential statement in April." The Republic of Korea Navy later salvaged debris from the rocket, and a South Korean senior military official said, based on the debris, that the design of the oxidizer tank suggested an "Iran connection".
- Republic of China – Via a spokesperson, President Ma Ying-jeou expressed that "the two North Korean rocket tests of this year have caused an uneasy situation in East Asia", and that he believed that such actions were unwise. It was also announced that Taiwan supported the international community in its opposition to North Korea's actions.
- United Kingdom – Foreign Secretary William Hague stated that he "deplore[d] the fact that the DPRK has chosen to prioritise this launch over improving the livelihood of its people".
- United States of America – A spokesman for the National Security Council described the launch as "another example of North Korea's pattern of irresponsible behavior" and called for "a clear message to North Korea that its violations of U.N. Security Council resolutions have consequences."
- Vietnam – Foreign Ministry's Spokesperson Luong Thanh Nghi stressed "We expect relevant parties will not take actions harmful to the region's peace and stability and strictly observe the United Nations Security Council Resolution 1874".

==== Organizations ====
- NATO – The Secretary General described the launch as a "provocative act" which "exacerbates tensions in the region and risks further destabilising the Korean peninsula".
- United Nations – The Secretary-General Ban Ki-moon condemned the launch as a violation of United Nations Security Council Resolution 1874 by conducting a launch using ballistic missile technology.

=== Registration ===
On 22 February 2013, the Permanent Mission of the Democratic People's Republic of Korea to the United Nations registered the satellite in conformity with the Convention on Registration of Objects Launched into Outer Space. In the registration, North Korea states that the function is to survey crops, forest resources and natural disasters.
