= Kwangmyŏngsŏng-1 =

North Korean satellite

- An image released on North Korean television of the first experimental satellite Kwangmyŏngsŏng-1
- Mission type: Technology
- Operator: KCST
- Mission duration: Launch failure

Start of mission
- Launch date: 31 August 1998, 03:07 UTC
- Rocket: Paektusan
- Launch site: Tonghae

Orbital parameters
- Reference system: Geocentric
- Regime: Low Earth
- Perigee altitude: 218.82 kilometres (135.97 mi)
- Apogee altitude: 6,978.2 kilometres (4,336.1 mi)
- Inclination: 40.6 degrees
- Period: 165 minutes, 6 seconds
- Epoch: Claimed

Satellite launches of North Korea. ①: Kwangmyŏngsŏng-1 ②: Kwangmyŏngsŏng-2 ③: Kwangmyŏngsŏng-3 ④: Kwangmyŏngsŏng-4

Kwangmyŏngsŏng-1 (Note: Also known as Gwangmyeongseong-1 under South Korea's Revised Romanization.) (Korean: 광명성 1호; lit. Bright Star 1) was a satellite allegedly launched by North Korea on 31 August 1998. While the North Korean government claimed that the launch was successful, no objects were ever tracked in orbit from the launch, and outside North Korea it is considered to have been a failure. It was the first satellite to be launched as part of the Kwangmyŏngsŏng program, and the first satellite that North Korea attempted to launch.

It was launched from Musudan-ri using a Paektusan rocket, at 03:07 GMT on 31 August 1998, a few days before the 50th anniversary of North Korea's foundation. On 4 September, the Korean Central News Agency announced that the satellite had successfully been placed into low Earth orbit.

The China National Space Administration was involved in the development of Kwangmyŏngsŏng-1, which had a 72-faced polyhedral shape, similar to Dong Fang Hong I, the first Chinese satellite. The mass of the satellite is unclear, with estimates ranging from 6 kilograms (13 lb) to 170 kilograms (370 lb).

== Etymology ==
The names "Paektusan" and "Kwangmyŏngsŏng" are richly symbolic for Korean nationalism and the Kim family cult. Paektusan (Mount Paektu) is the highest mountain in Korea (North and South) and is located on the border with China. According to Korean nationalist mythology, Tangun, the mythical founder of Korea, was born on the mountain in 2333 BC. And according to DPRK hagiographic propaganda, the mountain is sacred as the home of Kim Il Sung's anti-Japanese guerrilla base, as well as the birthplace of Kim Jong Il. Even though Kim Jong Il was born in the former Soviet Far East near Khabarovsk, DPRK sources claim Kim was born on Mount Paektu, and on that day a bright lode star (kwangmyŏngsŏng) appeared in the sky, so everyone knew a new general had been born.

== Design ==
In designing the Kwangmyŏngsŏng-1, North Korea received considerable assistance from the China's Academy of Launch Technology. This assistance has continued with the development of the Kwangmyŏngsŏng-2 satellite project. It may also extend to additional satellites, including a crude reconnaissance satellite. Thus, the photographs published after the launch showed a satellite similar in shape with a 72-faced polyhedron, to the first Chinese satellite, Dong Fang Hong I, itself very similar to Telstar 1, though estimations of the mass and therefore the size of Kwangmyŏngsŏng-1 differed according to the various sources, ranging from 6 kg to 170 kg (as compared to the 173 kg and 100 cm × 100 cm × 100 cm of the DFH-1).

== Launch ==
On 7 August 1998, scientific personnel began to arrive at the Musudan-ri test site to prepare for a satellite launch. Two weeks later, Korean People's Navy vessels were deployed into the Sea of Japan (East Sea of Korea) to track the rocket during its ascent to orbit. The launch was originally scheduled for an evening launch window on 30 August, in order to provide favorable conditions for observing the launch. Due to adverse weather, the window was extended, and launch occurred at 03:07 GMT (12:07 local time), by which time the weather had improved.

By mid-August, U.S. intelligence had detected activity consistent with preparation and support of a missile flight test, and on 31 August, North Korea launched the Paektusan-1 in an attempt to place a small satellite into earth orbit. U.S. intelligence observed the preparations for the launch, so the timing was not a surprise; however, most analysts did not expect the missile to be configured as a space launch vehicle with a third stage. The United States initially considered the launch a test of intercontinental ballistic missile technology, but it later noted that the rocket's trajectory indicated an orbital launch attempt.

It is thought that the Paektusan-1 solid propellant third stage both demonstrated a near full duration burn and the spin up of the stage and satellite along its longitudinal axis. However, the third stage solid motor ruptured, de-orbiting the satellite almost immediately after orbital insertion while achieving orbital velocity. U.S. officials said the launching represented North Korea's interests to build longer-range missiles.

Despite the launch failure, North Korea reported Kwangmyŏngsŏng-1 as a total success,. with the government counting its supposed orbital passes and publishing statements of praise from international supporters.

North Korean rockets flown over the Japanese archipelago
| No. | Date | Model | Area flown over | Advance notice | North Korean claim | Satellite name |
|---|---|---|---|---|---|---|
| 1 | 31 August 1998 | Taepodong-1 | Akita | No | Satellite launch | Kwangmyŏngsŏng-1 |
| 2 | 5 April 2009 | Unha-2 | Akita, Iwate | Yes | Satellite launch | Kwangmyŏngsŏng-2 |
| 3 | 12 December 2012 | Unha-3 | Okinawa | Yes | Satellite launch | Kwangmyŏngsŏng-3 |
| 4 | 7 February 2016 | Kwangmyŏngsŏng (Unha-3) | Okinawa | Yes | Satellite launch | Kwangmyŏngsŏng-4 |
| 5 | 29 August 2017 | Hwasong-12 | Hokkaido | No | Missile launch | N/A |
| 6 | 15 September 2017 | Hwasong-12 | Hokkaido | No | Missile launch | N/A |
| 7 | 4 October 2022 | Hwasong-12 modified | Aomori | No | Missile launch | |

== Reactions ==
=== North Korea ===
The 31 August 1998, Paektusan-1 launch was significant for North Korean domestic politics. North Korean media did not announce the test until 4 September, one day before the Supreme People's Assembly amended the DPRK Constitution to usher in the Kim Jong-il era. On 2 September, the official spokesman of the consulate general of the Democratic People's Republic of Korea in Nakhodka has refused to comment to Russian news agency ITAR-TASS on the launching of a medium-range missile from the territory of his country. What is more, he said that at the consulate general itself they had learned of the launching from the media. The DPRK Socialist Constitution declared Kim Il-sŏng "eternal president of the DPRK" and elevated the status of the National Defense Commission, which is chaired by Kim Jong-il. In the days before and after the attempted satellite launch, DPRK media often made references to the doctrine of Kangsŏngdaeguk (national strength and prosperity) since satellite launches and missiles represent the highest levels of technology.

On 13 September, the North Korean media reported that the satellite had completed its 100th orbit, and that it was in an elliptical medium Earth orbit with a perigee of 218.82 kilometres (135.97 mi) and apogee of 6,978.2 kilometres (4,336.1 mi) with a period of 165 minutes and 6 seconds. North Korea stated that the satellite carried transmitters which broadcast the "Song of General Kim Il-sung", the "Song of General Kim Jong-il" and "Juche Korea" in morse code, on a frequency of 27 MHz. It also claimed that the spacecraft returned data on the temperature and pressure in space, and the conditions of its power source.

=== People's Republic of China ===
China stated that it had no prior knowledge of the launch and has promised the United States that it will help keep "nuclear missiles out of North Korea". However, the Chinese government had expressed concern over the proposed joint US-Japanese Theater Missile Defense (TMD) plan and warned that, "Japan and the United States should exercise restraint and refrain from doing anything that may cause tensions in the region".

=== Russia ===
According to the head of Strategic Missile Troops Vladimir Yakovlev "in accordance with international agreements" North Korea warned Russia of the rocket launch. Yakovlev also reported that an accident during the launch caused the rocket to change its trajectory and therefore not enter the tracking zone of Russian monitoring systems. However, the Russian Ministry of Foreign Affairs contradicted Yakovlev's report. Ministry sources said that no agreements on missile launch warnings exist between Russian and North Korea, and that no one was notified about the test ahead of time. A spokesman for the Russian Ministry of Foreign Affairs said that although North Korea's missile launch concerned Moscow, Russia would like to have normal, friendly relations with North Korea.

=== South Korea ===
South Korea's response was relatively muted. In his U.N speech on 25 September 1998, South Korean Foreign Affairs and Trade Minister Hong Soon-young called on the global community to make a concerted effort to deter North Korea from developing, testing, and exporting missiles. He also released a joint press statement with Japanese Foreign Minister Masahiko Komura and US Secretary of State Madeleine Albright condemning North Korea's missile launch, but reaffirming support for the 1994 Agreed Framework.

=== United States ===
On 10 September, the United States announced a package of agreements aimed at defusing tensions and resuming the stalled Four Party Talks on the Korean Peninsula U.S. President Bill Clinton used his executive authority to circumvent congressional opposition to the 1994 Agreed Framework by shifting $15 million to fund the purchase of 150,000 tons of heavy fuel oil for North Korea.

== See also ==
- Kwangmyŏngsŏng-2
- Kwangmyŏngsŏng-3
- North Korea and weapons of mass destruction
- Taepodong-2
- 1993 North Korean missile test
- Taepodong-1
