= Taepodong-2 =

North Korean space launching technology

- Type: Space launcher technology development, possibly ballistic missile

Service history
- In service: 2006 (only test)

Production history
- Manufacturer: North Korea

Specifications
- Mass: ≈80 tonnes
- Length: ≈30 m
- Diameter: 2.0–2.2 m
- Engine: Liquid
- Operational range: 4,000–6,700 km (est.)
- Maximum speed: 690–800 m/s
- Guidance system: Inertial
- Launch platform: Launch pad

- Taepodong-2
- Hangul: 대포동 2호
- Hanja: 大浦洞 2號
- RR: Daepodong 2ho
- MR: Taep'odong 2ho

The Taepodong-2 (TD-2, also spelled as Taep'o-dong 2) (Korean: 대포동 2호) is a designation used to indicate what was initially believed to be a North Korean two- or three-stage ballistic missile design that is the successor to the Taepodong-1 technology demonstrator. In 2012, the U.S. Department of Defense assessed that the Taepodong-2 had not been deployed as a missile. The Taepodong-2 is the technology base for the Unha space launch vehicle, and was likely not intended as ICBM technology.

== Details ==
As there is no publicly available imagery of the only Taepodong-2 launch in 2006, all estimates of technical parameters are approximate.

Based on the size of the missile, the fuel composition, and the likely fuel capacity, it is estimated that a two-stage variant would have a range of around 4,000 km (2,500 mi) and a three-stage variant would be capable of reaching as far away as 4,500 km (2,800 mi), giving it potentially the longest range in the North Korean missile arsenal. The burn time of each stage is a little over 100 seconds, thus allowing the missile to burn for 5 or 6 minutes. Speculative variants of the missile could be capable of a range of approximately 9,000 km (5,600 mi). At maximum range, the Taepodong-2 is estimated to have a payload capacity of less than 500 kg (1,100 lb).

According to a former worker in the publications department of one of North Korea's top research centres, who defected to South Korea, North Korea began development of the missile in 1987.

Very few details concerning the technical specifications of the rocket are public information; even the name "Taepodong-2" is a designation applied by agencies outside North Korea to what is presumed to be a successor to the Taepodong-1. The TD-2 first stage likely uses a liquid propellant (TM-185 fuel and AK-27I oxidizer) driven engine and the second stage likely utilises the Rodong short-range missile. Depending on the range, the estimated payload capacity could be as high as 700–1,000 kg (1,500–2,200 lb) at short range, making it potentially suitable for conventional weapons payloads, NBC payloads as well as Earth orbit satellite delivery. At maximum range, the Taepodong-2 is estimated to have a payload capacity of less than 500 kg (1,100 lb). North Korea has yet to demonstrate the ability to produce a re-entry vehicle, without which North Korea cannot deliver a weapon from an ICBM.

In 2015, aerospace engineer and North Korea missile program analyst John Schilling stated that North Korea did not seem to be planning to create an operational ICBM from the Taepodong-2 technology, and that the Taepodong-2 had been mistakenly identified as an ICBM development, whereas in reality it was a space launch development vehicle.

== Structure ==
=== First stage ===
Taepodong-2's first stage consists of four Rodong motors.

=== Second and third stages ===
Little is known about the Taepodong-2 design beyond the first stage. Most likely the second stage is one of the Scud-derived North Korean ballistic missiles (either Hwasong-7/Rodong-1 or Hwasong-6), and the third stage most likely uses Chinese solid-fuel engines.

== Launches ==
=== 2006 test ===
A Taepodong-2 was test fired on 5 July 2006 from the Tonghae test facility. According to reports, the missile failed in mid-flight about 40 seconds after launch.

=== Subsequent Unha launches ===
Subsequent launches were intended to launch satellites, using a Taepodong-2 development called the Unha rocket. After two failures in April 2009 and April 2012, its first successful flight, Unha-3, occurred in December 2012 with the launch of the second version of Kwangmyŏngsŏng-3 satellite.

This successful flight was repeated on 7 February 2016 (UTC) with the successful launch of Kwangmyŏngsŏng-4 using a similar rocket as Unha-3 even though the rocket is officially named as Kwangmyŏngsŏng (not to be confused with the satellite with the same name).

== See also ==
- Military of North Korea
- North Korea and weapons of mass destruction
- 2006 North Korean missile test
