= Kwangmyŏngsŏng-4 =

2016 North Korean reconnaissance satellite

- Mission type: Earth observation Technology
- Operator: NADA
- COSPAR ID: 2016-009A
- SATCAT no.: 41332
- Mission duration: 4 years

Spacecraft properties
- Dry mass: 150–200 kilograms

Start of mission
- Launch date: 7 February 2016, 00:30 UTC
- Rocket: Unha
- Launch site: Sohae Space Center

End of mission
- Decay date: 30 June 2023

Orbital parameters
- Reference system: Sun-synchronous orbit
- Regime: Low Earth
- Perigee altitude: 465 kilometres (289 mi)
- Apogee altitude: 502 kilometres (312 mi)
- Inclination: 97.5 degrees
- Period: 94 minutes, 24 seconds

- Kwangmyŏngsŏng-4
- Chosŏn'gŭl: 광명성 – 4호
- Hancha: 光明星4號
- Revised Romanization: Gwangmyeongseong-4 ho
- McCune–Reischauer: Kwangmyŏngsŏng-4

Satellite launches of North Korea. ①: Kwangmyŏngsŏng-1 ②: Kwangmyŏngsŏng-2 ③: Kwangmyŏngsŏng-3 ④: Kwangmyŏngsŏng-4

Kwangmyongsong-4 (Note: Abbreviated as KMS-4.) (Korean: 《광명성―4》호; lit. 'Lodestar-4') was a satellite launched by North Korea on 7 February 2016.

The launch happened after North Korea conducted a nuclear test on 6 January and as the United Nations Security Council was deciding on sanctions to be placed on the country following the nuclear test. The launch was also timed to celebrate the 74th birthday of the late leader Kim Jong Il on February 16.

== Pre-launch ==
On 2 February 2016, North Korea sent a notification to the International Maritime Organization stating that the country was going to launch a Kwangmyongsong Earth observation satellite with a launch window of 8–25 February between 22:30 UTC and 03:30 UTC given. The notification also included the drop zones for the first stage, the payload fairing and the second stage of the rocket, which was similar to the areas designated for the launch of Kwangmyongsong-3 Unit 2.

On 6 February 2016, North Korea sent another notification to the International Maritime Organization stating that the launch window had been changed to 7–14 February.

== Launch ==
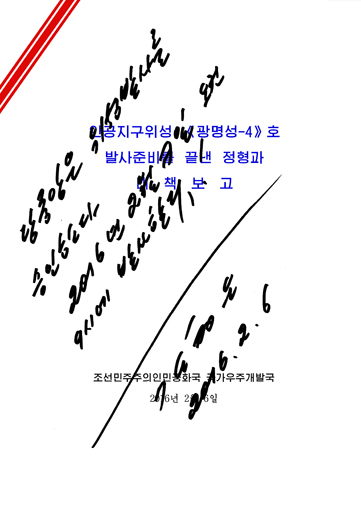
Order on launching the satellite, signed by Kim Jong Un

The satellite was launched on 7 February 2016 at 00:30 UTC into roughly a Sun-synchronous orbit well suited for an Earth observation satellite, using an Unha launch vehicle at Sohae Space Centre in Cholsan County, North Pyongan Province. Regarded as sending a message to both neighboring China as well as the United States, the launch also took place on the eve of the Chinese New Year and the Super Bowl in United States.

It was initially claimed by U.S. officials that the satellite was "tumbling in orbit" and that no signals had yet been detected being transmitted from it. However, it was later reported the tumbling had been brought under control and the orbit stabilized. This indicates that the satellite has established communication with North Korea.

The head of the U.S. Army Space and Missile Defense Command stated that Kwangmyongsong-4 was almost twice as large as Kwangmyongsong-3, and South Korean officials estimated the mass as 200 kilograms (440 lb).

On 22 February 2016, Russian news agency TASS reported the statement by Colonel Andrei Kalyuta of Russia's National Space Monitoring Center that, based on the orbit of the satellite, it was in line with the declared purpose. Satellite tracker and astronomer for Leiden Observatory Marco Langbroek captured images of the satellite on 28 February; on examining long exposure images, the satellite was either not tumbling or in a very slow tumble. This was also evident by the stability of the brightness of the Sun's reflection when the satellite passed the camera frame. Bob Christy of Zarya website shared results of observing orbital periods of the satellite, it indicated the satellite was not tumbling and was under control as controlled reduction in altitude of the orbit was detected. North Korea Tech, an affiliate of 38 North, reported on findings made by Langbroek and Christy. Harvard-Smithsonian Center for Astrophysics Jonathan Mcdowell concluded satellite was at least partially operational based on visual information and observation of the satellite's gravity boom being deployed.

== Post-launch ==
North Korea registered the satellite with the United Nations Office for Outer Space Affairs on 9 May 2016.

In addition to claiming North Korea was planning a Moon mission, Hyon Kwang-il, director of the scientific research department at NADA, said the satellite had completed 2,513 orbits and had transmitted 700 photographic images in the day following its launch. The satellite passed over North Korea four times a day and transmitted data on each pass. However, international experts, such as astrophysicist Jonathan McDowell, have not confirmed any transmissions from the satellite.

The satellite decayed from orbit on 30 June 2023.

== Reactions ==
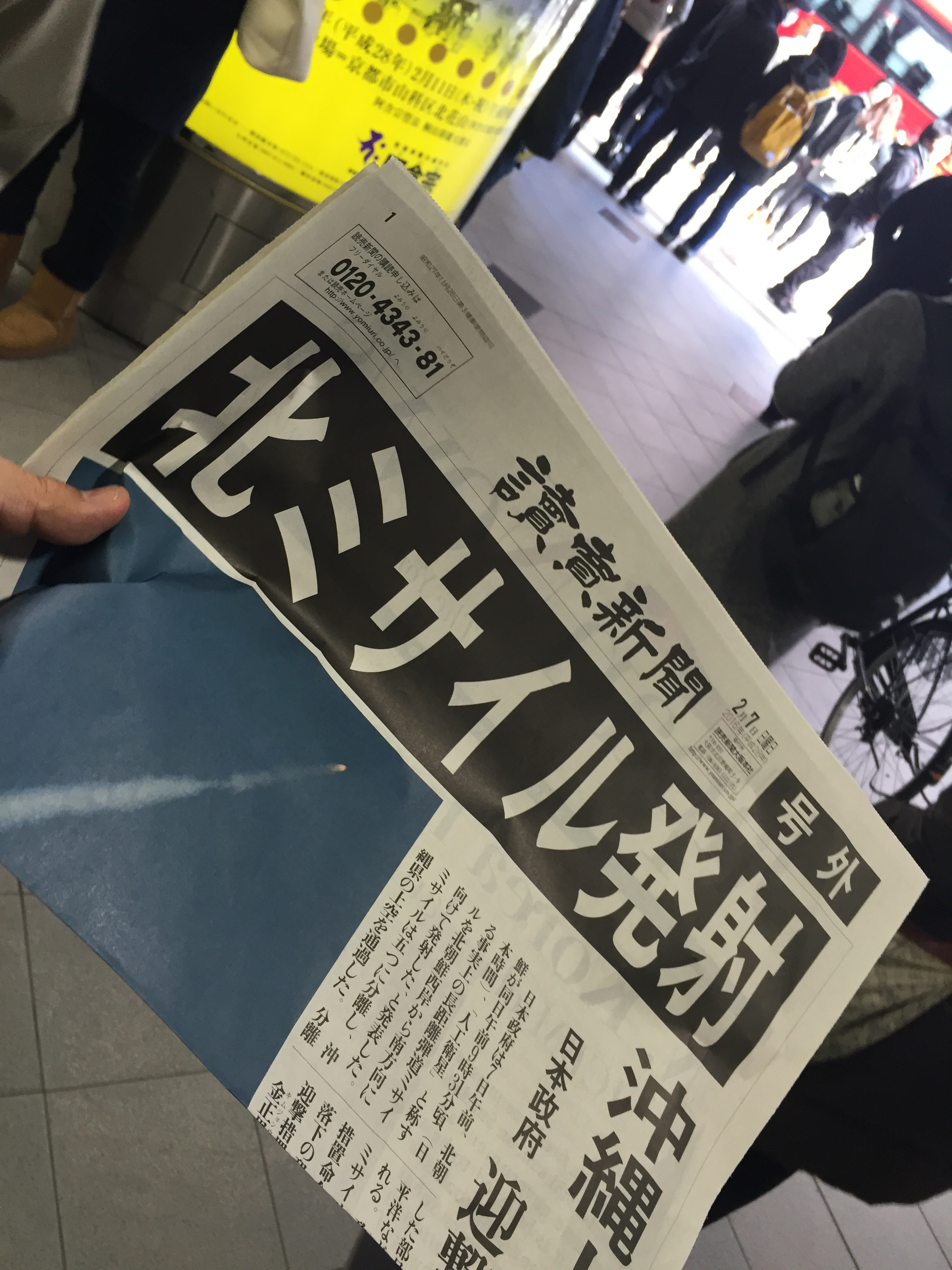
Yomiuri Shimbun newspaper extra informing Japanese readers about the launch

The North Korean government organized a fireworks display on 7 February 2016, in commemoration of the launch.

South Korea, Japan, the United States and other countries have accused North Korea of testing a ballistic missile (Unha is the satellite launch version of Taepodong-2) capable of hitting the United States. However, some experts at the time believed North Korea was still a decade away from having the capability to successfully deliver a nuclear weapon by means of an intercontinental ballistic missile (ICBM), and the launch showed slow, but continuous, progress. The director of the U.S. Missile Defense Agency stated the launch was not a test of an intercontinental ballistic missile.

The launch was strongly condemned by the UN Security Council. It prompted South Korea and the United States to announce that they would explore the possibility of deploying Terminal High Altitude Area Defence (THAAD), an advanced missile defence system, in South Korea, which is strongly opposed by China and Russia.

== See also ==
- 2016 in spaceflight
- List of North Korean missile tests
