= Kwangmyŏngsŏng-2 =

North Korean satellite

- Kwangmyongsong-2 as it would have looked in orbit in a 2009 computer graphic video
- Mission type: Communication/Technology
- Operator: KCST
- Mission duration: Failed to orbit

Start of mission
- Launch date: April 5, 2009, 02:20:00 UTC
- Rocket: Unha-2
- Launch site: Tonghae

Orbital parameters
- Reference system: Geocentric
- Regime: Low Earth
- Perigee altitude: 490 kilometres (300 mi)
- Apogee altitude: 1,426 kilometres (886 mi)
- Inclination: 40.6 degrees
- Period: 104.2 minutes
- Epoch: Claimed

- Kwangmyŏngsŏng-2
- Hangul: 광명성 2호
- Hanja: 光明星 2號
- RR: Gwangmyeongseong 2ho
- MR: Kwangmyŏngsŏng 2ho

Satellite launches of North Korea. ①: Kwangmyŏngsŏng-1 ②: Kwangmyŏngsŏng-2 ③: Kwangmyŏngsŏng-3 ④: Kwangmyŏngsŏng-4

Kwangmyŏngsŏng-2 (Korean: 광명성 2호, meaning Bright Star-2 or Lode Star-2) was a satellite launched by North Korea on April 5, 2009.

Prior to the launch, concern was raised by other nations, particularly the United States, South Korea and Japan, that the launch would test technology that could be used in the future to launch an intercontinental ballistic missile. The launch of the rocket was sharply condemned by the United States and the European Union, while the People's Republic of China and Russia urged restraint. On April 13, 2009, the United Nations Security Council issued a Presidential Statement condemning the launch as a violation of United Nations Security Council Resolution 1718 (2006). One day after, on April 14, 2009, North Korea called the Presidential Statement an infringement on a country's right for space exploration embodied in the Outer Space Treaty and withdrew from Six Party Talks.

== Etymology ==
The name "Kwangmyŏngsŏng" is in reference to a lodestar. According to some, it is richly symbolic for North Korean nationalism and the Kim family cult. Even though the late North Korean leader Kim Jong Il was born in the village of Vyatskoye near Khabarovsk in the Russian Far East, DPRK sources claim Kim was born on Mount Paektu, and on that day a bright lode star (kwangmyŏngsŏng) appeared in the sky, so everyone knew a new general had been born.

== Pre-launch announcement ==
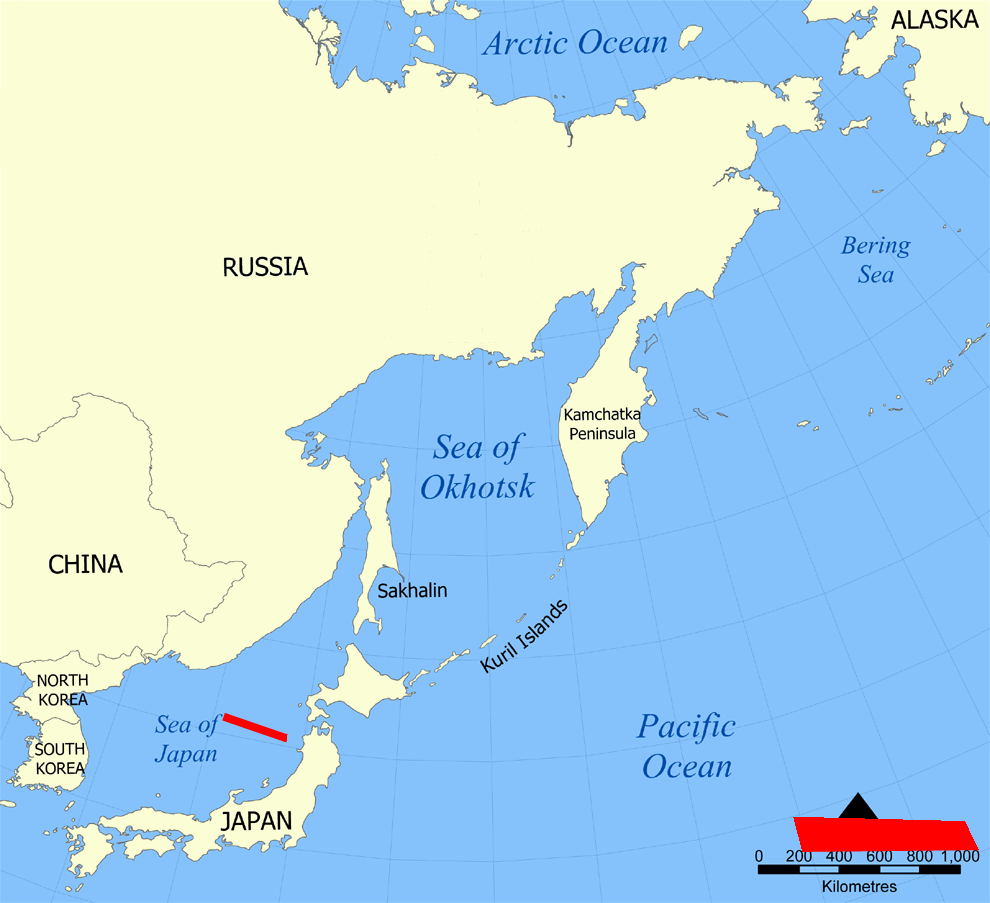
Danger zones one and two reported to ICAO (approximate areas in red on left and right)

The launch was first publicly announced on February 24, 2009, when the Korean Central News Agency reported that they had been informed by the Korean Committee of Space Technology that preparations for a satellite launch were underway, and that the satellite would be launched from Musudan-ri in Hwadae. At about the same time, Kim Jong Il visited the province where the launch site is located, as he had immediately prior to the previous launch on July 4, 2006. In addition, on February 26, 2009, KCNA revealed that the KCST had a long-term plan of putting various types of satellites into orbit.

=== International response to the announcement ===
Prior to the official announcement that the launch would be of a satellite-carrying rocket, it was reported that North Korea was preparing to test a missile in violation of United Nations Security Council Resolution 1718. Following the announcement that it was a satellite launch attempt, the US government stated that it would consider intercepting the rocket if it did not appear to be an orbital launch, while Japan ordered the JSDF, on March 26, to intercept debris of the rocket in case the firing failed and fell in Japanese territory or territorial waters. North Korea responded that it would consider any attempt to intercept the launch to be an act of war, the spokesman of the DPRK force said "We will launch thunder and fire not only to projected JSDF interception forces but to important areas of Japan." South Korea, Japan, and the United States deployed their Aegis destroyers and cruisers in the Sea of Japan, destroyers which are equipped with BMD SM-3 missiles. Japan also moved its PAC-3 Patriot ground-based interceptor missiles to bases in Akita and Iwate. U.S. Defense Secretary Robert M. Gates said the U.S. didn't plan to intercept the launching or to shoot down the rocket in flight. Japan deployed their Aegis destroyers to the Sea of Japan, with an order to prepare to shoot down any debris that could fall on Japanese territory. South Korea also dispatched an Aegis-equipped destroyer off the east coast.

=== NOTAM ===
On March 12 North Korea announced that it had signed the Outer Space Treaty and the Registration Convention. It also informed the ICAO and IMO that it would conduct a satellite launch between April 4 and 8, during a launch window running from 02:00 to 07:00 UTC. It reported that the rocket's first stage was planned to fall about 650 kilometres (400 mi) east-north-east of South Korea's Donghae, the second stage would fall about 3,600 kilometres (2,200 mi) downrange, and the third stage would enter low Earth orbit with the satellite. The ICAO map showed danger zone one extending between longitudes 135 and 138 at latitude 40 North, and zone two between longitudes 164 and 172 at latitudes 29 to 34 North. North Korea designated the waters off Japan's Akita and Iwate prefectures as a risk zone for falling debris.

In addition, the SLV will be launched eastward at an angle of 90.5 degrees, meaning it will have a 0.5-degree westward tilt resulting in a longer flight path over Japan, thus avoiding the re-entry of the second stage into the Pacific Ocean off of Hawaii, in order to prevent further criticism from the US but at an increased escalation risk with Japan.

According to North Korean meteorological forecast, the launch site is expected to have either snow or rain in the afternoon on April 4, cloudy skies on April 5 and clear skies from April 6 to 10, as pictures of the assembled launch vehicle were publicly disclosed revealing a quite short third stage with a fairly large nosecone fairing, and a first stage taking up about two-thirds of the launcher. The long first stage has a clearly larger diameter than the shorter second stage. Fueling process was reported to have started on April 2, 2009. On April 4, 2009, KCNA reported that the KCST had completed all the preparations for launch and that lift-off would be imminent. KCST indicated that the weather was the most important factor determining the success of the satellite launch, and terrestrial wind speed should be less than 15 metres per second (49 ft/s). Korean weather forecast predicted that Saturday would be cloudy, with winds between 6 and 10 metres per second (20 and 33 ft/s), and Sunday would be very cloudy and windy early on, with clouds and wind starting to die down somewhat in the afternoon. Wind speed would settle to around 3 to 4 metres per second (9.8 to 13.1 ft/s) on Monday and there would be clear weather on Tuesday.

The Japanese government mistakenly announced that the KSCT fired a rocket on April 4, 2009, at about 12 pm. Tokyo time, sending nationwide emergency warnings, only to be retracted less than five minutes later, and announced the error was originated from the JSDF FPS-5 radar's faulty detection.

On April 5, 2009, North Korea announced that the Kwangmyŏngsŏng-2 satellite had been officially launched at 11:30:15 (0230 GMT plus 15 seconds); officials in South Korea, Russia and the United States reported that the rocket and its payload had fallen into the Pacific Ocean without having achieved orbit.

== Launch details ==
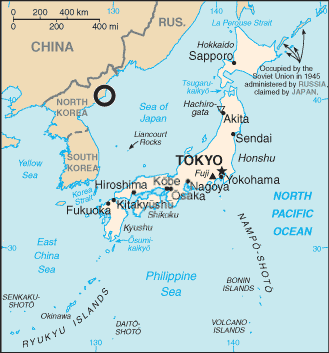
The circle locates North Korea's Tonghae Satellite Launching Ground (Musudan-ri)

The launch proceeded in relatively clear weather conditions. The launch pad was at the Tonghae Satellite Launching Ground, in the North Korean province of North Hamgyong, near the northern tip of the East Korea Bay. The rocket flew over the Japanese islands, by when it was in outer space at an altitude of over 300 km. North Korea stated the first stage of the rocket would fall in the sea 75 kilometres (47 mi) west of Japan, and the second stage would fall into the Pacific Ocean. Japanese authorities stated no reports of damage or injury in Japan as a result of the launch, and that the rocket's first stage "landed in the water as had been expected". According to the United States Northern Command, the remaining stages along with the payload itself landed in the Pacific Ocean. Officials and analysts in Seoul said the rocket flew at least 2,000 miles (3,200 km), doubling the range of the one that carried Kwangmyŏngsŏng-1 in 1998. Later analysis suggested the rocket impacted 2,390 miles (3,850 km) from the launch site, and that second stage operated normally but the rocket's third stage failed to separate properly.

=== The satellite ===
Pyongyang claimed that Kwangmyŏngsŏng-2 was an experimental communications satellite as part of a peaceful space project.

According to state news agency KCNA, which claimed the launch was successful, the satellite's orbital parameters consist of a 490 kilometres (300 mi) perigee and 1,426 kilometres (886 mi) apogee, with an orbital period of 104 minutes and 12 seconds and an orbital inclination of 40.6 degrees. The satellite was said to have entered orbit nine minutes and two seconds after launch and began transmitting data and the "Song of General Kim Il Sung" and "Song of General Kim Jong Il" on a frequency of 470 MHz. However, similar claims were made in 1998 for Kwangmyŏngsŏng-1, whose launch attempt is believed to have failed.

According to The Christian Science Monitor, South Korean experts asserted that the satellite was a dummy. Myung Noh-hoon, director of the Space Research Centre at KAIST was quoted as saying "They cannot have been shooting a real satellite. They did not build a satellite." However, in a conflicting statement, an unnamed South Korean official announced that the rocket appeared to have carried a satellite. A senior Russian military source on Monday confirmed U.S and South Korean reports that North Korea failed to place a satellite in orbit saying "Our space monitoring system did not establish the placing into orbit of the North Korean satellite. According to our information, it's just not there".

=== Accidents during the preparation of launch ===
On March 3, 2015, it was reported by KCNA and subsequently repeated by Chinese media, e.g. Sina, that Kim Jong Un had visited Unit 447 of the Korean People's Army's Air and Anti-Air Force and planted trees with fighter pilots of the unit in recognition of fourteen pilots, who lost their lives during the launch of Kwangmyongsong-2. Kim Jong Un subsequently visited a monument erected to the memory of the fighters to recognize the heroic feats performed by the 14 fighter pilots in the operation to ensure the successful launch of the satellite. It was also reported that Kim Jong Un had accompanied the then leader Kim Jong Il in 2009 to observe the launch.

North Korean rockets flown over the Japanese archipelago
No.	Date	Model	Area flown over	Advance notice	North Korean claim	Satellite name
1	31 August 1998	Taepodong-1	Akita	No	Satellite launch	Kwangmyŏngsŏng-1
2	5 April 2009	Unha-2	Akita, Iwate	Yes	Satellite launch	Kwangmyŏngsŏng-2
3	12 December 2012	Unha-3	Okinawa	Yes	Satellite launch	Kwangmyŏngsŏng-3
4	7 February 2016	Kwangmyŏngsŏng (Unha-3)	Okinawa	Yes	Satellite launch	Kwangmyŏngsŏng-4
5	29 August 2017	Hwasong-12	Hokkaido	No	Missile launch	N/A
6	15 September 2017	Hwasong-12	Hokkaido	No	Missile launch	N/A
7	4 October 2022	Hwasong-12 modified	Aomori	No	Missile launch	

== North Korean reaction and internal celebrations ==
The successful satellite launch symbolic of the leaping advance made in the nation's space science and technology was conducted against the background of the stirring period when a high-pitched drive for bringing about a fresh great revolutionary surge is under way throughout the country to open the gate to a great prosperous and powerful nation without fail by 2012, the centenary of birth of President Kim Il Sung, under the far-reaching plan of general secretary Kim Jong Il. This is powerfully encouraging the Korean people all out in the general advance.

— KCNA, "KCNA on DPRK's Successful Launch of Satellite Kwangmyongsong-2"

A mass rally by thousands of North Koreans took place in Kim Il-sung Square, Pyongyang to celebrate the launch of the satellite.

In August 2009, postage stamps commemorating the launch were brought into circulation. The souvenir sheet says "Launch of Artificial Satellite 'Kwangmyongsong No. 2' in the DPRK".

== International response to the launch ==
=== Members of the six-party talks ===
- Korea – Foreign Minister Yu Myung-hwan stated that "The North's launch is a provocative act that clearly violates United Nations Security Council [Resolution] 1718 that regardless of the North's claims threatens peace and stability of the Korean Peninsula and Northeast Asia."
- Japan – Prime Minister Tarō Asō stated that "the fact that North Korea went ahead with the launch despite repeated warnings from around the world, especially the United States, South Korea and Japan, was an extremely provocative act and one that Japan cannot let go unchallenged. So, cooperating with the international community, we want to respond (considering that) it was clearly a violation of the U.N. resolutions."
- China – Foreign Ministry spokeswoman Jiang Yu stated "We hope related parties stay calm and exercise restraint, appropriately deal with it and together maintain peace and stability in this region. The Chinese side is willing to continue to play a constructive role."
- Russia – A Foreign Ministry spokesman said, "We are checking whether this (launch) is not a violation of certain resolutions of the U.N. Security Council and call on all sides to refrain from actions that could lead to escalation of tensions on the Korean peninsula."
- United States – President Barack Obama stated "North Korea's development and proliferation of ballistic missile technology pose a threat to the northeast Asian region and to international peace and security. With this provocative act, North Korea has ignored its international obligations, rejected unequivocal calls for restraint, and further isolated itself from the community of nations." Barack Obama gave a speech in Prague about the missile launch. Obama stated that "North Korea...has broke the rules...once again...by testing a rocket that could be used for long range missiles. Rules must be binding. Violations must be punished. Words must mean something. The world must stand together to prevent the spread to these weapons. It is time for an international response to prevent the spread of these weapons."

=== International organisations ===
- European Union – The EU called on North Korea to suspend its nuclear activities related to the ballistic missile programme and all other nuclear weapons in a "complete, verifiable and irreversible manner."
- NATO – Secretary General Jaap de Hoop Scheffer condemned the launch, calling it "highly provocative, and in violation of United Nations Security Council Resolution 1718 barring North Korea from developing ballistic missile capability or launching ballistic missiles". He commented that the launch would deepen concern about North Korea in the region and beyond, complicate the 6-party talks and called on North Korea to cease such provocative actions.
- United Nations – Secretary-General Ban Ki-moon said that "Given the volatility in the region ... such a launch is not conducive to efforts to promote dialogue, regional peace and stability. The Secretary-General urges (North Korea) to comply with relevant Security Council resolutions." Members of the Security Council voted unanimously on April 13, 2009 for a Presidential Statement that condemned the rocket launch, which it described as "in contravention" to United Nations Security Council Resolution 1718, and demanded North Korea make no more launches. It also allowed for an "adjustment" of sanctions and set up a committee to make recommendation on such an adjustment by April 24. The statement of was a compromise reached after the five permanent members of the Security Council and Japan failed to agree on a resolution with new sanctions.

=== Other countries ===
- Australia – Australian Prime Minister Kevin Rudd called the North Korean launch "provocative" and "reckless". "We urge the council to immediately consider further action," he said in a statement.
- Canada – Canadian Minister of Foreign Affairs Lawrence Cannon stated that "Canada is very concerned by North Korea's decision to launch a long-range rocket. This ill-advised action undermines confidence in North Korea's commitment to peace and security. Canada calls upon North Korea to comply fully with the requirements of UNSCR 1718 and suspend all activities related to its ballistic missile program."
- France – President Nicolas Sarkozy said that North Korea had placed itself "outside international law", calling for further enforcement of sanctions by the international community to "punish the regime."
- India – A spokesman from the External Affairs Ministry described the launch as having a "destabilising effect" in the "volatile region" and hoped that the response would be "restrained and proportionate". Any decision should be taken by the UN.
- Indonesia – Foreign Ministry spokesman Teuku Faizasyah was concerned over the launch, adding that it has "increased the risk of tension although it still has to be verified whether it was a satellite or a missile. Our main concern is North Korea's launch has gone against the nuclear disarmament spirit in East Asia." He also stated that suspicions would continue until the relevant parties meet and negotiate.
- New Zealand – Foreign Minister Murray McCully said the test was "reckless" and did not help peace and stability in the region. McCully also stated that it was a "backwards step" for North Korea, and urged the country to focus on meeting the agreements made during the six-party talks as it was in its interests to do so.
- Singapore – A statement issued by the Foreign Ministry stated it was "deeply concerned" at the launch, and urged all parties to exercise restraint and reduce tensions through dialogue.
- Switzerland – The Swiss Foreign Ministry condemned the incident, saying that it violated United Nations Security Council Resolution 1718, but also called for "all parties to refrain from any action that could aggravate the situation" and for "dialogue and moderation to be given priority".
- United Kingdom – The UK's Foreign Secretary David Miliband said that he strongly condemned North Korea's launch of a rocket and urged it to "cease immediately all further missile-related activity."
- Venezuela – Venezuelan President Hugo Chavez said in an interview in Tokyo that due to the "lack of information, and contradictory information ... I prefer to have a great deal of prudence as the Russian government has said".

== North Korean response to criticism ==
Shortly after members of the United Nations Security Council unanimously condemned the rocket launch, North Korea responded in a statement released by its foreign ministry on April 14, 2009 that the UN action was an "unbearable insult", and the UN statement infringed its sovereignty and "severely debases" its people. It also decided to quit the six-party talks, saying "There is no need for the six-party talks any more. We will never again take part in such talks and will not be bound by any agreement reached at the talks." The statement added that North Korea intended to "bolster its nuclear deterrent for self-defence in every way" and that it would restart the Yongbyon reactor. North Korea partially dismantled the reactor in 2008 as part of an international agreement in return for foreign aid and diplomatic concessions. On April 18, Pyongyang unexpectedly announced that it would interpret sanctions and criticism levelled after the launch as "a declaration of war" and reasserted the North Korean military's willingness to defend against "aggression" from South Korea and the United States. On April 29, it further demanded "apology" from the U.N. Security Council and threatened with more nuclear tests and intercontinental ballistic missile tests. On 25 May, North Korea claimed that it had conducted a second nuclear test.

The International Atomic Energy Agency said on April 14 that North Korea informed its inspectors of immediate cessation of all cooperation with the IAEA and instructed them to leave the country.

=== Reactions by members of the six-party talks ===
- Japan – Kyodo News Agency reported that Japan urged North Korea to return to the six-party talks.
- China – A spokesman for the Foreign Ministry was quoted as saying, "The Chinese side hopes all sides will continue to advance and push forward the six-party talks and the denuclearisation of the Korean peninsula." The Foreign Ministry issued a statement on April 14 urging all parties to "exert calmness and restraint, jointly maintain peace and stability of the Korean Peninsula and Northeast Asia, and make concerted efforts to consistently facilitate the six-party talks and denuclearization on the Korean Peninsula".
- Russia – Russia expressed its "regret" at North Korea's actions and also "call[ed] on North Korea to return to the negotiating table in the interests of denuclearising the Korean peninsula". Foreign Minister Sergei Lavrov said that Russia "hopes for resuming the six-party talks on the North Korean nuclear problem soon", according to ITAR-TASS.
- United States – Secretary of State Hillary Clinton called North Korea's decision to stop cooperating with the atomic energy panel "an unnecessary response to the legitimate statement put out of concern by the Security Council." White House spokesman Robert Gibbs called North Korea's "announced threat to withdraw from the six-party talks and restart its nuclear program ... a serious step in the wrong direction".

== See also ==
- Kwangmyŏngsŏng program
- Korean People's Army Strategic Force
- North Korea and weapons of mass destruction
