= 1993 North Korean missile test =

A North Korean missile test occurred on May 29 and 30, 1993. North Korea fired a Nodong-1 missile into the Sea of Japan, from a base in Hwadae County near Wonsan, North Korea. The target was a buoy floating in the Sea of Japan. The North Koreans were testing the missile so they could export it to Iran in return for oil. Japanese and United States officials waited a few days before disclosing the launch of the missile. Afterwards, North Korea reaffirmed its commitment to the Nuclear Non-Proliferation Treaty.

The missile launches were the culmination of several months' planning and bargaining with Iran, and what was suggested to be a plot between Iran and North Korea to develop weapons capable of striking Japan. It began in March 1993, with North Korea receiving several shipments of "special metals" designated for the construction of missile launch pads. Later, a Russian report indicated that North Korea was in the market for "missile specialists" in order to turn their missile production into a more profitable venture. Russian officials were further incensed after detaining a group of Russian nuclear physicists and rocket scientists attempting to enter North Korea. North Korea later pledged not to use Russian scientists and technicians, after being threatened with cut diplomatic ties by Russia.

In January of that year, the commander of the Iranian Revolution Guard Corps, Mohsen Rezaee, went to Pyongyang to finalize a 2.7 billion dollar purchase of around 300 Scud missiles from North Korea. Around the same time, the Iranian delegation came to watch the final Nodong-1 tests and North Korea announced its withdrawal from the Nuclear Non-Proliferation Treaty. It was suspected upon successful testing of the missiles, Iran intended to trade oil for the Nodong missiles, as Iran is a primary contributor of North Korea's oil (over 40%).

== See also ==
- Strategic Rocket Forces (North Korea)
- North Korea and weapons of mass destruction
