= Unha =

North Korean expendable carrier rocket

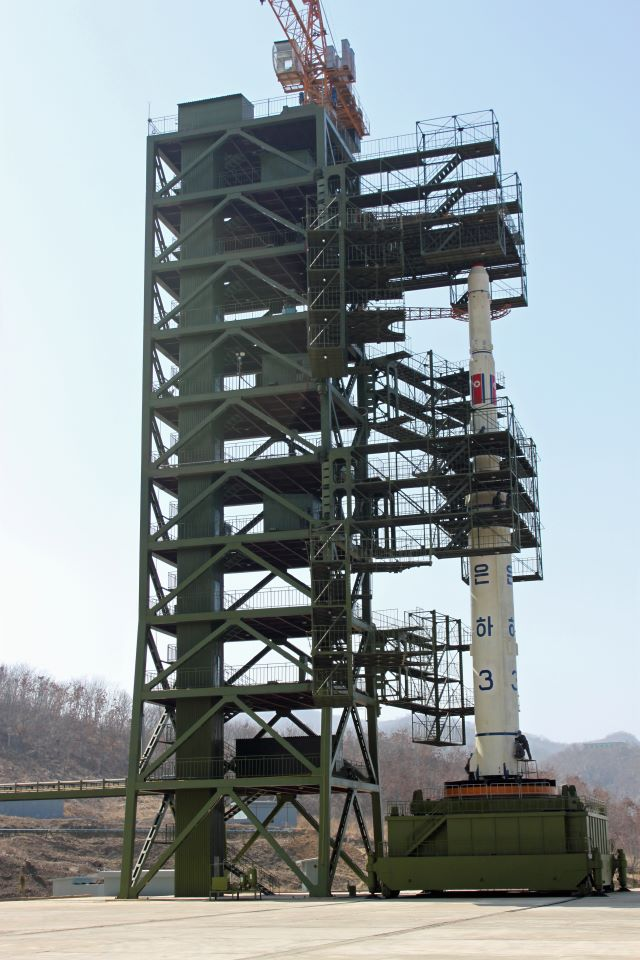
- Unha-3 at launch pad in April 2012
- Function: Expendable carrier rocket
- Manufacturer: National Aerospace Development Administration
- Country of origin: North Korea

Size
- Height: 28–30 metres (92–98 ft)
- Diameter: 2.4 metres (7 ft 10 in)
- Mass: 86,750–91,000 kilograms (191,250–200,620 lb)
- Stages: 3

Capacity

Payload to LEO
- Mass: 200 kg (440 lb) (465 x 502 km)

Launch history
- Status: Active
- Launch sites: Sohae, Tonghae
- Total launches: 4
- Success(es): 2
- Failure: 2
- First flight: 5 April 2009

First stage
- Height: 15 m (49 ft)
- Diameter: 2.4 m (7 ft 10 in)
- Powered by: 4 Nodong 2-1
- Maximum thrust: 1,192.8 kN (268,200 lb_{f})
- Specific impulse: 252 sec
- Burn time: 120 seconds
- Propellant: N_{2}O_{4}/UDMH

Second stage
- Height: 8.8–9.3 m (29–31 ft)
- Diameter: 1.5 m (4 ft 11 in)
- Powered by: 4 verniers
- Maximum thrust: 125 kN
- Specific impulse: 255 s
- Burn time: 220 seconds
- Propellant: N_{2}O_{4}/UDMH

Third stage
- Height: 3.7–5.7 m (12–19 ft)
- Diameter: 1.2–1.25 m (3 ft 11 in – 4 ft 1 in)
- Powered by: 2 verniers
- Maximum thrust: 35.4 kN
- Specific impulse: 230 sec
- Burn time: 245 seconds
- Propellant: N_{2}O_{4}/UDMH

- Unha
- Hangul: 은하
- Hanja: 銀河
- RR: Eunha
- MR: Ŭnha

The Unha (Note: Also romanized from Korean script as Eunha under South Korea's Revised Romanization.) (Korean: 은하; lit. 'Galaxy') is a North Korean expendable carrier rocket, which partially utilizes the same delivery system as the Taepodong-2 orbital launch system.

== Description ==
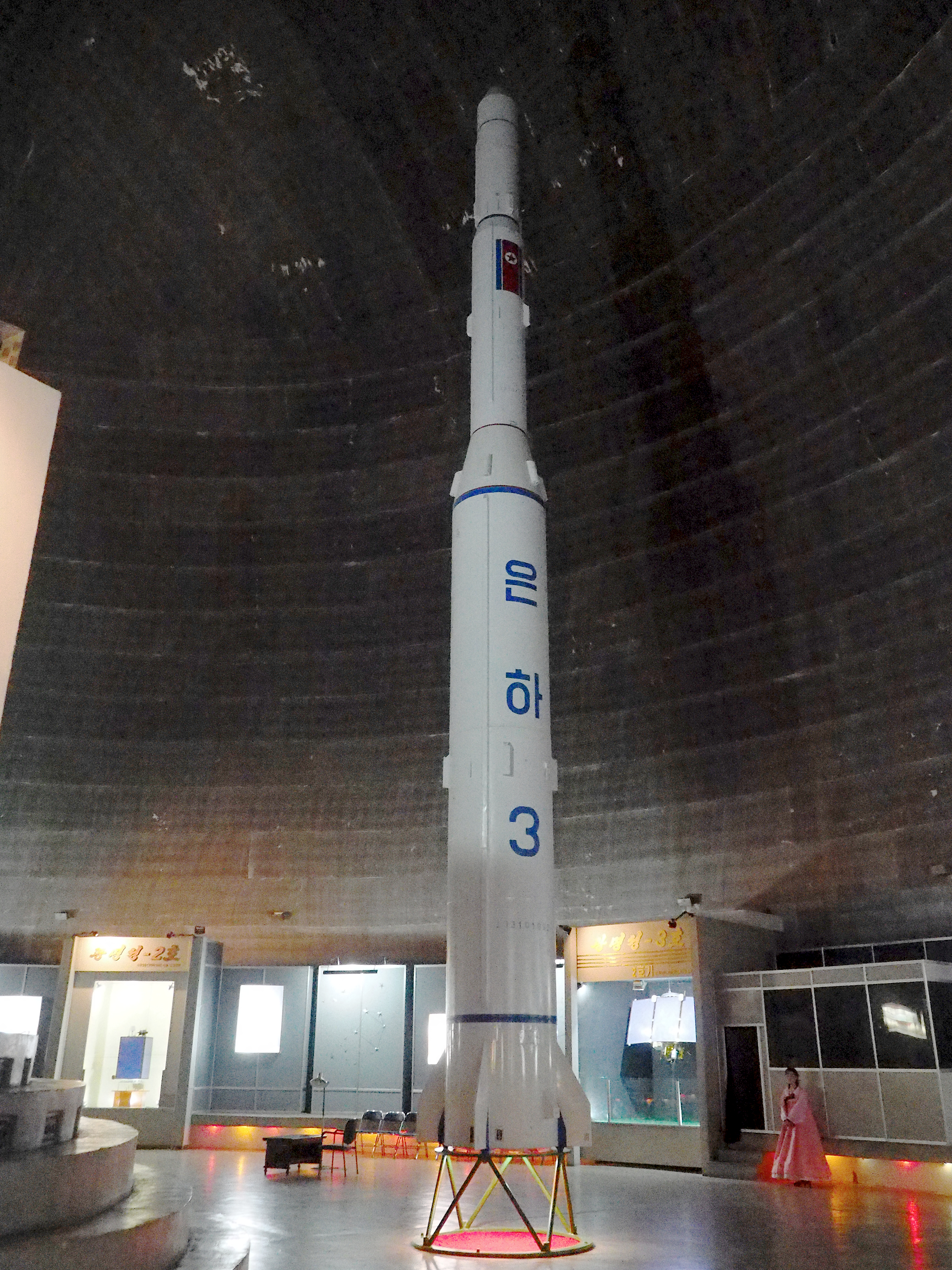
Model of a Unha-3 rocket on display at the Three Revolutions Exhibition Hall

The Unha's first stage consists of four clustered Nodong motors, which themselves are enlarged Scud motors. The second stage was initially thought to be based on the SS-N-6, although it, too, is now believed to be based on Scud technology. The third and last stage might be identical to the Iranian Safir's second stage which is propelled by two small gimballed motors.

Recent satellite images of the Sohae Satellite Launching Station showing an enlarged launch tower under construction have prompted online speculation that an enlarged version, called "Unha-X", might be under development.

== History ==
=== First space launch attempt of North Korea ===
North Korea's first orbital space launch attempt occurred on 31 August 1998, and was unsuccessful. This launch attempt was performed by a Paektusan-1 rocket, which used a Hwasong-7-based first stage, a Hwasong-6-based second stage and a solid-fueled third stage. The Paektusan-1 was estimated to be about 24 metres (79 ft) long, have a mass of about 21,000 kg (46,000 lb) and a first stage diameter of 1.25 m (4.1 ft).

=== Launch history of Unha ===
==== First launch attempt ====
On 24 February 2009, North Korea announced the plan to launch the Kwangmyŏngsŏng-2 satellite onboard the Unha-2 launch vehicle. Later, North Korea confirmed that the launch would take place between 4–8 April 2009. However, before the launch, several countries, including South Korea, the U.S., and Japan, voiced concerns that the launch would violate United Nations Security Council Resolution 1718 which prohibits North Korea from testing ballistic missiles. Russia also announced they urged North Korea to refrain from its planned rocket launch.

On 5 April 2009, the Unha-2 rocket was launched at around 02:30 a.m. UTC (11:30 a.m. local time) from the Tonghae Satellite Launching Ground (also known as Musudan-ri). The U.S. Northern Command said that the first stage of the rocket fell into the Sea of Japan (East Sea of Korea), while the other rocket stages as well as the payload fell into the Pacific Ocean, and no object entered orbit. Later analysis indicated the rocket impacted 3,850 km (2,390 mi) from the launch site, and that the second stage operated normally but the rocket's third stage failed to separate properly. North Korea maintains that the rocket successfully put its payload in orbit.

==== Second launch attempt ====
On 13 April 2012, North Korea launched the Kwangmyŏngsŏng-3 satellite onboard an Unha-3 rocket from the Sohae Satellite Launching Station, but it ended in failure.

==== Third launch attempt ====
After the failure of the April 2012 launch, North Korea announced that the launch of the second version of the Kwangmyŏngsŏng-3 satellite would occur between 10 and 22 December 2012. Later, the launch window was extended to 29 December 2012, as the Unha-3 launch vehicle suffered a "technical deficiency". The launch took place at 00:49 a.m. UTC, 12 December 2012, as an Unha-3 rocket was launched from Sohae. The Japanese government believed the rocket separated into three parts, landed in the sea off the Korean Peninsula, the East China Sea and the Philippine Sea, respectively. North Korea claimed that the satellite successfully entered orbit, while according to North American Aerospace Defense Command, the rocket deployed an object that appears to have achieved orbit.

After the launch, South Korean military retrieved debris from the launch vehicle, and confirmed that the militarized version of Unha-3 might have a range of over 10,000 km (6,200 mi) with a payload of 500–600 kg (1,100–1,300 lb).

==== Fourth launch attempt ====
In early-February 2016, North Korea announced that they would launch a satellite between 8 and 25 February 2016. Later, the launch window was revised to 7–14 February. On 7 February 2016, the first day of the revised launch window, North Korea launched another Unha rocket from Sohae. Officially dubbed Kwangmyongsong, it was claimed to insert the Kwangmyŏngsŏng-4 satellite into orbit. However, analysis suggests a significant shortfall in third-stage performance, leading to a lower than expected orbit.

== List of launches ==
Official designation	Date	Launch site	Payload	Outcome
Unha-2	5 April 2009	Tonghae	(North Korea) Kwangmyŏngsŏng-2	Failure
Unha-3	13 April 2012	Sohae	(North Korea) Kwangmyŏngsŏng-3	Failure
Unha-3	12 December 2012	Sohae	(North Korea) Kwangmyŏngsŏng-3 Unit 2	Success
Kwangmyŏngsŏng (Unha-3)	7 February 2016	Sohae	(North Korea) Kwangmyŏngsŏng-4	Success

== See also ==
- North Korean space program
- Naro-1
- Simorgh
- Chollima-1
