= Taepodong-1 =

North Korean space launch vehicle

- Type: technology demonstrator

Service history
- Used by: North Korea

Production history
- Manufacturer: North Korea

Specifications
- Mass: 33.4 tons
- Length: 25.8 m
- Diameter: 1.8 m
- Engine: liquid-fueled
- Guidance system: inertial

- Taepodong-1
- Hangul: 대포동-1
- Hanja: 大浦洞-1
- RR: Daepodong-1
- MR: Taep'odong-1

Taepodong-1 (Korean: 대포동-1) was the external designation given to a three-stage technology demonstrator developed by North Korea, a development step toward an intermediate-range ballistic missile. The design was derived from the USSR's Scud missile. It was tested once, in 1998, as a space launch vehicle; as such it was sometimes called the Paektusan 1, after the Paektu Mountain.

== History ==
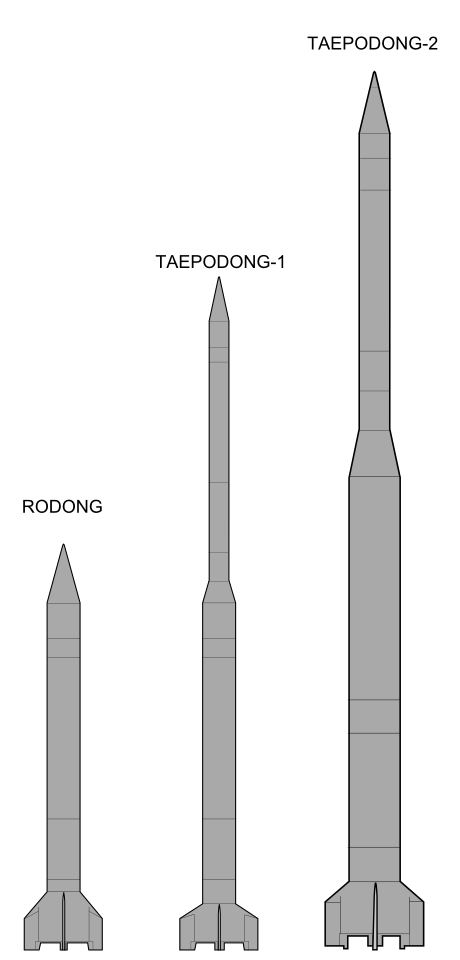
Rodong (or, Nodong) and Taepodong 1 and 2

North Korean missile launches over Japan ①: Taepodong-1 ②: Unha-2 ③: Unha-3 ④: Kwangmyŏngsŏng (Unha-3) ⑤: Hwasong-12 ⑥: Hwasong-12

On August 31, 1998, North Korea announced that they had used this rocket to launch their first satellite Kwangmyŏngsŏng-1 from a pad on the Musudan-ri peninsula. However, the satellite failed to achieve orbit; outside observers conjecture that the additional third stage either failed to fire or malfunctioned. This is contrary to official statements of the North Korean state media, which stated that the satellite achieved orbit about 5 minutes after launch. On this single launch, the main two-stage booster flew for 1,646 km without any significant problems.

The rocket was launched eastward, passing over Japan at an altitude of over 200 km. The second stage came down into the Pacific Ocean about 60 km past Japan, and the third stage about 600 km beyond Japan. According to post-launch analysis of the launch vehicle, debris from the third stage fell as far as 4,000 kilometers from the launch pad. Some analysts believe that a three-stage space booster variant of the Taepodong-1 could be capable of travelling as far as 5,900 kilometers with a very small payload.

In 2003, the US Defense Intelligence Agency reported to the Congress: "We have no information to suggest Pyongyang intends to deploy the Taepo Dong 1 (TD-1) as a surface-to-surface missile in North Korea. We believe instead that the vehicle was a test bed for multi-stage missile technologies." In 2009, the US National Air and Space Intelligence Center assessed that the Taepodong-1 was a technology demonstrator, a development step toward longer-range missile development.

The Taepodong-2, or Unha-2, was the successor to the Taepodong-1 technology demonstrator, with a first (unsuccessful) test launch in 2006.

== Description ==
- Liftoff thrust: 525.25 kN (118,080 lb_{f})
- Total mass: 33,406 kg (73,648 lb)
- Diameter: 1.8 m (5 ft 11 in)
- Length: 25.8 m (85 ft)
- Range with 1,500 kg (3,300 lb) of payload: 2,000 km (1,200 mi)
- Range with 1,000 kg (2,200 lb) of payload: 2,500 km (1,600 mi)
- Range with 50 kg (110 lb) of payload and third stage: 6,000 km (3,700 mi)

The rocket's first stage is a Hwasong-7 (Rodong-1) MRBM, and the second stage uses a single engine from the Hwasong-7.

In a nominal space launch, the first stage burns for 95 seconds, before separating, and landing about 250 kilometres (160 mi) downrange. The payload fairing separates 144 seconds after launch. This is followed by the depletion and separation of the second stage, 266 seconds into the flight, resulting in an impact about 1,650 kilometres (1,030 mi) downrange. The third stage, which is spin-stabilised, then burns for 27 seconds to insert the payload into low Earth orbit. The payload is estimated at 6 kg (13 lb) mass.

== See also ==
- Korean People's Army Strategic Force
- Military of North Korea
