= List of spaceflight launches in July–December 2023 =

This article lists orbital and suborbital launches planned for the second half of the year 2023, including launches planned for 2023 without a specific launch date.

For all other spaceflight activities, see 2023 in spaceflight. For launches in the first half of 2023, see List of spaceflight launches in January–June 2023. For launches in 2024, see List of spaceflight launches in January–June 2024.

== Orbital launches ==
- ← Jan
- Feb
- Mar
- Apr
- May
- Jun
- Jul
- Aug
- Sep
- Oct
- Nov
- Dec →

=== July ===
Date and time (UTC)	Rocket	Flight number	Launch site		LSP	
Date and time (UTC)	Payload (⚀ = CubeSat)	Operator	Orbit	Function	Decay (UTC)	Outcome
Date and time (UTC)	Remarks					
1 July; 15:12:00	(United States) Falcon 9 Block 5	F9-236	(United States) Cape Canaveral SLC-40		(United States) SpaceX	
1 July; 15:12:00	Euclid	ESA	Sun–Earth L_{2}	Astronomy	In orbit	Operational
1 July; 15:12:00	Launch vehicle changed from Soyuz ST-B due to the indefinite suspension of Soyuz launches from Kourou in February 2022.					
5 July; 22:00:07	(France) Ariane 5 ECA	VA261	(France) Kourou ELA-3		(France) Arianespace	
5 July; 22:00:07	(Germany) Heinrich Hertz (H2Sat)	DLR	Geosynchronous	Communications	In orbit	Operational
5 July; 22:00:07	(France) Syracuse 4B (Comsat-NG 2)	DGA	Geosynchronous	Communications	In orbit	Operational
5 July; 22:00:07	Final Ariane 5 launch.					
7 July; 19:29:50	(United States) Falcon 9 Block 5	Starlink Group 5-13	(United States) Vandenberg SLC-4E		(United States) SpaceX	
7 July; 19:29:50	(United States) Starlink × 48	SpaceX	Low Earth	Communications	In orbit	Operational
7 July; 19:29:50	Last launch of Starlink v1.5 satellites from Vandenberg. Last launch of Starlink Group 5 Satellites from Vandenberg.					
9 July; 11:00	(China) Long March 2C / YZ-1S	2C-Y52	(China) Jiuquan SLS-2		(China) CASC	
9 July; 11:00	(China) Hulianwang Jishu Shiyan 1A	CAS	Low Earth	Communications	In orbit	Operational
9 July; 11:00	(China) Hulianwang Jishu Shiyan 1B	CAS	Low Earth	Communications	In orbit	Operational
9 July; 11:00	It is part of the Guowang (Xingwang) constellation.					
10 July; 03:58:50	(United States) Falcon 9 Block 5	Starlink Group 6-5	(United States) Cape Canaveral SLC-40		(United States) SpaceX	
10 July; 03:58:50	(United States) Starlink × 22	SpaceX	Low Earth	Communications	In orbit	Operational
12 July; 01:00:05	(China) Zhuque-2	Y2	(China) Jiuquan LS-96		(China) LandSpace	
12 July; 01:00:05	No payload	LandSpace	Low Earth (SSO)	Flight test	In orbit	Successful
12 July; 01:00:05	Second orbital flight attempt for Zhuque-2. First successful launch of a methane fueled orbital rocket.					
14 July; 09:05:17	(India) LVM 3	M4	(India) Satish Dhawan SLP		(India) ISRO	
14 July; 09:05:17	(India) Chandrayaan-3 Propulsion module	ISRO	Selenocentric	Lunar orbiter	In orbit	Operational
14 July; 09:05:17	(India) Vikram	ISRO	Selenocentric	Lunar lander	23 August 2023; 12:32	Successful
14 July; 09:05:17	(India) Pragyan	ISRO	Selenocentric	Lunar rover	23 August 2023; 12:32	Successful
14 July; 09:05:17	Chandrayaan-3 Mission. Mission repeat of Chandrayaan-2.					
16 July; 03:50:00	(United States) Falcon 9 Block 5	Starlink Group 5-15	(United States) Cape Canaveral SLC-40		(United States) SpaceX	
16 July; 03:50:00	(United States) Starlink × 54	SpaceX	Low Earth	Communications	In orbit	Operational
16 July; 03:50:00	Last launch of Starlink v1.5 satellites from Cape Canaveral And Kennedy. Last launch of Starlink Group 5 Satellites from Cape Canaveral.					
18 July; 01:27	(United States) Electron	"Baby Come Back"	(New Zealand) Mahia LC-1B		(United States) Rocket Lab	
18 July; 01:27	(Canada) Telesat LEO 3	Telesat	Low Earth	Technology demonstration	In orbit	Operational
18 July; 01:27	⚀ (United States) Lemur-2 × 2	Spire Global	Low Earth	Earth observation	In orbit	Operational
18 July; 01:27	⚀ (United States) Starling × 4	NASA	Low Earth	Technology demonstration	In orbit	Operational
18 July; 01:27	Rideshare Mission.					
20 July; 03:20	(China) Kuaizhou 1A	Y22	(China) Jiuquan LS-95A		(China) ExPace	
20 July; 03:20	(China) Tianmu-1 07–10	Xiyong Microelectronics	Low Earth (SSO)	Meteorology	In orbit	Operational
20 July; 04:09:30	(United States) Falcon 9 Block 5	Starlink Group 6-15	(United States) Vandenberg SLC-4E		(United States) SpaceX	
20 July; 04:09:30	(United States) Starlink × 15	SpaceX	Low Earth	Communications	In orbit	Operational
20 July; 04:09:30	First launch of Starlink Group 6 Satellites from Vandenberg.					
22 July; 05:07	(China) Ceres-1	Y6	(China) Jiuquan LS-95A		(China) Galactic Energy	
22 July; 05:07	(China) Qiankun-1	CSpace	Low Earth (SSO)	Technology demonstration	In orbit	Operational
22 July; 05:07	(China) Xingshidai-16 (Tai'an)	ADASpace	Low Earth (SSO)	Earth observation	In orbit	Operational
22 July; 05:07	Mission designated "Lemon Tree".					
23 July; 02:50	(China) Long March 2D	2D-Y91	(China) Taiyuan LC-9		(China) CASC	
23 July; 02:50	(China) Lingxi-03	Galaxy Space	Low Earth (SSO)	Communications	In orbit	Operational
23 July; 02:50	(China) Skysight AS-01	Skysight	Low Earth (SSO)	Earth observation	In orbit	Operational
23 July; 02:50	(China) Skysight AS-02	Skysight	Low Earth (SSO)	Earth observation	In orbit	Operational
23 July; 02:50	(China) Skysight AS-03	Skysight	Low Earth (SSO)	Earth observation	In orbit	Operational
24 July; 00:50:30	(United States) Falcon 9 Block 5	Starlink Group 6-6	(United States) Cape Canaveral SLC-40		(United States) SpaceX	
24 July; 00:50:30	(United States) Starlink × 22	SpaceX	Low Earth	Communications	In orbit	Operational
26 July; 20:02	(China) Long March 2D	2D-Y81	(China) Xichang LC-3		(China) CASC	
26 July; 20:02	(China) Yaogan 36-05A	CAS	Low Earth	Reconnaissance	In orbit	Operational
26 July; 20:02	(China) Yaogan 36-05B	CAS	Low Earth	Reconnaissance	In orbit	Operational
26 July; 20:02	(China) Yaogan 36-05C	CAS	Low Earth	Reconnaissance	In orbit	Operational
28 July; 04:01:10	(United States) Falcon 9 Block 5	Starlink Group 6-7	(United States) Cape Canaveral SLC-40		(United States) SpaceX	
28 July; 04:01:10	(United States) Starlink × 22	SpaceX	Low Earth	Communications	In orbit	Operational
29 July; 03:04	(United States) Falcon Heavy	FH-007	(United States) Kennedy LC-39A		(United States) SpaceX	
29 July; 03:04	(United States) Jupiter-3 (EchoStar-24)	EchoStar	Geosynchronous	Communications	In orbit	Operational
29 July; 03:04	With a mass of 9.2 tonnes, Jupiter-3 is the heaviest commercial geostationary satellite to have ever launched.					
30 July; 01:00	(India) PSLV-CA	C56	(India) Satish Dhawan FLP		(India) NSIL	
30 July; 01:00	(Singapore) DS-SAR	DSTA	Low Earth	Earth observation	In orbit	Operational
30 July; 01:00	⚀ (Singapore) ARCADE	NTU	Low Earth	Ionospheric research	In orbit	Operational
30 July; 01:00	⚀ (Singapore) Galassia-2	NUS	Low Earth	Technology demonstration	In orbit	Operational
30 July; 01:00	⚀ (Singapore) NuLIoN	NuSpace	Low Earth	IoT	In orbit	Operational
30 July; 01:00	⚀ (United Kingdom) ORB-12 STRIDER	OrbAstro	Low Earth	Technology demonstration	In orbit	Operational
30 July; 01:00	⚀ (Singapore) SCOOB-II	NTU	Low Earth	Technology demonstration	In orbit	Operational
30 July; 01:00	⚀ (Singapore) Velox-AM	NTU	Low Earth	Technology demonstration	In orbit	Operational

- ← Jan
- Feb
- Mar
- Apr
- May
- Jun
- Jul
- Aug
- Sep
- Oct
- Nov
- Dec →

=== August ===
Date and time (UTC)	Rocket	Flight number	Launch site		LSP	
Date and time (UTC)	Payload (⚀ = CubeSat)	Operator	Orbit	Function	Decay (UTC)	Outcome
Date and time (UTC)	Remarks					
2 August; 00:31:17	(United States) Antares 230+		(United States) MARS LP-0A		(United States) Northrop Grumman	
2 August; 00:31:17	(United States) Cygnus NG-19; S.S. Laurel Clark	NASA	Low Earth (ISS)	ISS logistics	9 January 2024; 18:22	Successful
2 August; 00:31:17	Final flight of the Antares 230+ variant.					
3 August; 03:47	(China) Long March 4C	4C-Y44	(China) Jiuquan SLS-2		(China) CASC	
3 August; 03:47	(China) Fengyun 3F	CMA	Low Earth (SSO)	Meteorology	In orbit	Operational
3 August; 05:00	(United States) Falcon 9 Block 5	F9-243	(United States) Cape Canaveral SLC-40		(United States) SpaceX	
3 August; 05:00	(United States) Galaxy 37/Horizons-4 (Galaxy 13R)	Intelsat	Geosynchronous	Communications	In orbit	Operational
3 August; 05:00	Galaxy 37, also known as Galaxy 13R and Horizons-4, will replace Galaxy 13. Last Satellite in Intelsat Galaxy Satellite fleet.					
7 August; 02:41:10	(United States) Falcon 9 Block 5	Starlink Group 6-8	(United States) Cape Canaveral SLC-40		(United States) SpaceX	
7 August; 02:41:10	(United States) Starlink × 22	SpaceX	Low Earth	Communications	In orbit	Operational
7 August; 13:19:25	(Russia) Soyuz-2.1b / Fregat		(Russia) Plesetsk Site 43/3		(Russia) RVSN RF	
7 August; 13:19:25	(Russia) Kosmos 2569 (GLONASS-K2 13L (K2 №1))	VKS	Medium Earth	Navigation	In orbit	Operational
7 August; 13:19:25	First GLONASS-K2 satellite.					
8 August; 03:57:00	(United States) Falcon 9 Block 5	Starlink Group 6-20	(United States) Vandenberg SLC-4E		(United States) SpaceX	
8 August; 03:57:00	(United States) Starlink × 15	SpaceX	Low Earth	Communications	In orbit	Operational
8 August; 03:57:00	Last launch of Starlink Group 6 Satellites from Vandenberg.					
8 August; 22:53	(China) Long March 2C	2C-Y46	(China) Taiyuan LA-9		(China) CASC	
8 August; 22:53	(China) S-SAR 02 (Huanjing-2F)	Ministry of Emergency Management	Low Earth (SSO)	Earth observation	In orbit	Operational
10 August; 04:03:50	(China) Ceres-1	Y7	(China) Jiuquan LS-95A		(China) Galactic Energy	
10 August; 04:03:50	(China) Diwei Zhineng Yingji-1 (Henan Ligong-1)	Diwei Space Technology / SASERI / Suzhou Skyscanner	Low Earth (SSO)	Technology demonstration	In orbit	Operational
10 August; 04:03:50	(China) Xi'an Hangtou × 4	Xi'an Aerospace	Low Earth (SSO)	Earth observation	In orbit	Operational
10 August; 04:03:50	(China) Xiguang-1 01	XiopmSPACE	Low Earth (SSO)	Earth observation	In orbit	Operational
10 August; 04:03:50	(China) Xingchi-1B	Ellipse SpaceTime	Low Earth (SSO)	Earth observation	In orbit	Operational
10 August; 04:03:50	Mission designated "Lucky 7".					
10 August; 23:10:57	(Russia) Soyuz-2.1b / Fregat		(Russia) Vostochny Site 1S		(Russia) Roscosmos	
10 August; 23:10:57	(Russia) Luna 25	IKI RAN	TLI to lunar surface	Lunar lander	19 August; 11:57	Spacecraft failure
10 August; 23:10:57	First mission of the Luna-Glob Moon exploration programme, supposed to land near Boguslawsky crater. Contact with the spacecraft was lost on 19 August during an anomalous orbit lowering maneuver, and Roscosmos announced the following day that as a result of the maneuver the spacecraft entered an unplanned orbit and crashed on the Moon surface.					
11 August; 05:17:40	(United States) Falcon 9 Block 5	Starlink Group 6-9	(United States) Cape Canaveral SLC-40		(United States) SpaceX	
11 August; 05:17:40	(United States) Starlink × 22	SpaceX	Low Earth	Communications	In orbit	Operational
12 August; 17:26	(China) Long March 3B/E	3B-Y92	(China) Xichang LC-2		(China) CASC	
12 August; 17:26	(China) Ludi Tance-4 01A (L-SAR 04A)	Ministry of Natural Resources	IGSO	Earth observation	In orbit	Operational
12 August; 17:26	First SAR satellite in (inclined) geosynchronous orbit.					
14 August; 05:32	(China) Kuaizhou 1A	Y21	(China) Xichang		(China) ExPace	
14 August; 05:32	(China) Jiaotong 06–10 (HEAD 3A–3E)	HEAD Aerospace	Low Earth	AIS ship tracking	In orbit	Operational
17 August; 03:36:50	(United States) Falcon 9 Block 5	Starlink Group 6-10	(United States) Cape Canaveral SLC-40		(United States) SpaceX	
17 August; 03:36:50	(United States) Starlink × 22	SpaceX	Low Earth	Communications	In orbit	Operational
20 August; 17:45	(China) Long March 4C	4C-Y56	(China) Jiuquan SLS-2		(China) CASC	
20 August; 17:45	(China) Gaofen 12-04	CNSA	Low Earth (SSO)	Earth observation	In orbit	Operational
22 August; 09:37:50	(United States) Falcon 9 Block 5	Starlink Group 7-1	(United States) Vandenberg SLC-4E		(United States) SpaceX	
22 August; 09:37:50	(United States) Starlink × 21	SpaceX	Low Earth	Communications	In orbit	Operational
22 August; 09:37:50	100th Starlink launch. First launch of Starlink Group 7 Satellites.					
23 August; 01:08:10	(Russia) Soyuz-2.1a		(Kazakhstan) Baikonur Site 31/6		(Russia) Roscosmos	
23 August; 01:08:10	(Russia) Progress MS-24 / 85P	Roscosmos	Low Earth (ISS)	ISS logistics	13 February 2024; 05:16 UTC	Successful
23 August; 18:50	(North Korea) Chŏllima 1		(North Korea) Sohae		(North Korea) NADA	
23 August; 18:50	(North Korea) Malligyong-1 F2	NADA	Low Earth (SSO)	Flight test	23 August	Launch failure
23 August; 18:50	Second orbital launch attempted of Chollima-1. Launch failed because of an anomalous activation of the flight termination system during the flight of the third stage.					
23 August; 23:45	(United States) Electron	"We Love The Nightlife"	(New Zealand) Mahia LC-1B		(United States) Rocket Lab	
23 August; 23:45	(United States) Acadia-1 (Capella-11)	Capella Space	Low Earth	Earth observation	In orbit	Operational
23 August; 23:45	First of four dedicated launches for Capella Space. First reuse of a previously flown Rutherford engine.					
25 August; 04:59	(China) Ceres-1	Y8	(China) Jiuquan LS-95A		(China) Galactic Energy	
25 August; 04:59	(China) Jilin-1 Kuanfu-02A (HKUST-Xiongbin-1)	Chang Guang Satellite Technology	Low Earth (SSO)	Earth observation	In orbit	Operational
25 August; 04:59	Mission designated "Cornfield Chase".					
26 August; 07:27:27	(United States) Falcon 9 Block 5	F9-249	(United States) Kennedy LC-39A		(United States) SpaceX	
26 August; 07:27:27	(United States) SpaceX Crew-7	SpaceX / NASA	Low Earth (ISS)	Expedition 69/70	12 Mar 2024; 09:47	Successful
26 August; 07:27:27	Seventh operational Crew Dragon mission to the ISS.					
27 August; 01:05:40	(United States) Falcon 9 Block 5	Starlink Group 6-11	(United States) Cape Canaveral SLC-40		(United States) SpaceX	
27 August; 01:05:40	(United States) Starlink × 22	SpaceX	Low Earth	Communications	In orbit	Operational
31 August; 07:36	(China) Long March 2D	2D-Y82	(China) Xichang LC-3		(China) CASC	
31 August; 07:36	(China) Yaogan 39-01A	CAS	Low Earth	Reconnaissance	In orbit	Operational
31 August; 07:36	(China) Yaogan 39-01B	CAS	Low Earth	Reconnaissance	In orbit	Operational
31 August; 07:36	(China) Yaogan 39-01C	CAS	Low Earth	Reconnaissance	In orbit	Operational

- ← Jan
- Feb
- Mar
- Apr
- May
- Jun
- Jul
- Aug
- Sep
- Oct
- Nov
- Dec →

=== September ===
Date and time (UTC)	Rocket	Flight number	Launch site		LSP	
Date and time (UTC)	Payload (⚀ = CubeSat)	Operator	Orbit	Function	Decay (UTC)	Outcome
Date and time (UTC)	Remarks					
1 September; 02:21:50	(United States) Falcon 9 Block 5	Starlink Group 6-13	(United States) Cape Canaveral SLC-40		(United States) SpaceX	
1 September; 02:21:50	(United States) Starlink × 22	SpaceX	Low Earth	Communications	In orbit	Operational
2 September; 06:20	(India) PSLV-XL	C57	(India) Satish Dhawan SLP		(India) ISRO	
2 September; 06:20	(India) Aditya-L1	ISRO	Sun–Earth L_{1}	Heliophysics	In orbit	Operational
2 September; 06:20	First ISRO Mission dedicated to the study of the Sun. First Indian Satellite to reach a Sun–Earth Lagrange Point.					
2 September; 14:25	(United States) Falcon 9 Block 5	F9-252	(United States) Vandenberg SLC-4E		(United States) SpaceX	
2 September; 14:25	(United States) TOTL A-Class 7-13 (Wildfire 1-7)	SDA	Low Earth	Military communications	In orbit	Operational
2 September; 14:25	(United States) TOTL B-Class 4 (Checkmate 10)	SDA	Low Earth	Military communications	In orbit	Operational
2 September; 14:25	(United States) TOTL B-Class 5-7 (Wildfire 8-10)	SDA	Low Earth	Military communications	In orbit	Operational
2 September; 14:25	(United States) TOTR 3,4 (BB 3,4)	SDA	Low Earth	Early warning	In orbit	Operational
2 September; 14:25	Second of two launches for the Space Development Agency's Tranche 0 Transport and Tracking Layer (Tranche 0B Mission).					
4 September; 02:47:20	(United States) Falcon 9 Block 5	Starlink Group 6-12	(United States) Kennedy LC-39A		(United States) SpaceX	
4 September; 02:47:20	(United States) Starlink × 21	SpaceX	Low Earth	Communications	In orbit	Operational
5 September; 09:34:45	(China) Ceres-1S	Y1	(China) DeFu 15002 platform, Yellow Sea		(China) Galactic Energy	
5 September; 09:34:45	(China) Tianqi 21–24	Guodian Gaoke	Low Earth (SSO)	IoT	In orbit	Operational
5 September; 09:34:45	Mission designated "The Little Mermaid". First sea launch of Ceres-1 and maiden flight of the Ceres-1S variant.					
6 September; 18:14	(China) Long March 4C	4C-Y53	(China) Jiuquan SLS-2		(China) CASC	
6 September; 18:14	(China) Yaogan 33-03	CAS	Low Earth (SSO)	Earth observation	In orbit	Operational
6 September; 23:42:11	(Japan) H-IIA 202	F47	(Japan) Tanegashima LA-Y1		(Japan) MHI	
6 September; 23:42:11	(Japan) (United States) XRISM	JAXA / NASA	Low Earth	X-ray astronomy	In orbit	Operational
6 September; 23:42:11	(Japan) SLIM	JAXA	TLI to lunar surface	Lunar lander	19 January 2024; 15:20	Operational
6 September; 23:42:11	(Japan) LEV-1	JAXA	TLI to lunar surface	Lunar Hopper	19 January 2024; 15:20	Operational
6 September; 23:42:11	(Japan) LEV-2	Tomy / JAXA / Doshisha University	TLI to lunar surface	Lunar rover	19 January 2024; 15:20	Operational
6 September; 23:42:11	Launch of X-Ray Imaging and Spectroscopy Mission (XRISM) and Smart Lander for Investigating Moon (SLIM). Lunar Excursion Vehicle-2 or Sora-Q previously flew on the Hakuto-R Mission 1.					
9 September; 03:12:50	(United States) Falcon 9 Block 5	Starlink Group 6-14	(United States) Cape Canaveral SLC-40		(United States) SpaceX	
9 September; 03:12:50	(United States) Starlink × 22	SpaceX	Low Earth	Communications	In orbit	Operational
10 September; 04:40	(China) Long March 6A	6A-Y5	(China) Taiyuan LA-9A		(China) CASC	
10 September; 04:40	(China) Yaogan 40-01A	CAS	Low Earth	ELINT	In orbit	Operational
10 September; 04:40	(China) Yaogan 40-01B	CAS	Low Earth	ELINT	In orbit	Operational
10 September; 04:40	(China) Yaogan 40-01C	CAS	Low Earth	ELINT	In orbit	Operational
10 September; 12:47:00	(United States) Atlas V 551	AV-102	(United States) Cape Canaveral SLC-41		(United States) ULA	
10 September; 12:47:00	(United States) Silentbarker 1 (USA-346)	NRO	Geosynchronous	Space domain awareness	In orbit	Operational
10 September; 12:47:00	(United States) Silentbarker 2 (USA-347)	NRO	Geosynchronous	Space domain awareness	In orbit	Operational
10 September; 12:47:00	(United States) Silentbarker 3 (USA-348)	NRO	Geosynchronous	Space domain awareness	In orbit	Operational
10 September; 12:47:00	NROL-107 mission. Final NRO launch on an Atlas V.					
12 September; 06:57:50	(United States) Falcon 9 Block 5	Starlink Group 7-2	(United States) Vandenberg SLC-4E		(United States) SpaceX	
12 September; 06:57:50	(United States) Starlink × 21	SpaceX	Low Earth	Communications	In orbit	Operational
15 September; 02:28	(United States) Firefly Alpha	FLTA003	(United States) Vandenberg SLC-2W		(United States) Firefly	
15 September; 02:28	(United States) Victus Nox	Space Systems Command	Low Earth (SSO)	Space domain awareness	28 January 2025	Successful
15 September; 02:28	Tactically Responsive Space-3 (TacRS-3) mission.					
15 September; 15:44:35	(Russia) Soyuz-2.1a		(Kazakhstan) Baikonur Site 31/6		(Russia) Roscosmos	
15 September; 15:44:35	(Russia) Soyuz MS-24	Roscosmos	Low Earth (ISS)	Expedition 69/70	6 April 2024; 07:17 UTC	Successful
16 September; 03:38:20	(United States) Falcon 9 Block 5	Starlink Group 6-16	(United States) Cape Canaveral SLC-40		(United States) SpaceX	
16 September; 03:38:20	(United States) Starlink × 22	SpaceX	Low Earth	Communications	In orbit	Operational
17 September; 04:13	(China) Long March 2D	2D-Y83	(China) Xichang LC-3		(China) CASC	
17 September; 04:13	(China) Yaogan 39-02A	CAS	Low Earth	Reconnaissance	In orbit	Operational
17 September; 04:13	(China) Yaogan 39-02B	CAS	Low Earth	Reconnaissance	In orbit	Operational
17 September; 04:13	(China) Yaogan 39-02C	CAS	Low Earth	Reconnaissance	In orbit	Operational
19 September; 06:55	(United States) Electron	"We Will Never Desert You"	(New Zealand) Mahia LC-1B		(United States) Rocket Lab	
19 September; 06:55	(United States) Acadia-2 (Capella-12)	Capella Space	Low Earth	Earth observation	19 September	Launch failure
19 September; 06:55	Second of four dedicated launches for Capella Space. The launch failed due to a second stage anomaly.					
20 September; 03:38:10	(United States) Falcon 9 Block 5	Starlink Group 6-17	(United States) Cape Canaveral SLC-40		(United States) SpaceX	
20 September; 03:38:10	(United States) Starlink × 22	SpaceX	Low Earth	Communications	In orbit	Operational
20 September; 03:38:10	A record 17th launch of a single booster (B1058)					
21 September; 04:59:10	(China) Ceres-1	Y11	(China) Jiuquan LS-95A		(China) Galactic Energy	
21 September; 04:59:10	(China) Jilin-1 Gaofen-04B	Chang Guang Satellite Technology	Low Earth (SSO)	Earth observation	21 September	Launch failure
21 September; 04:59:10	Mission designated "Autumn Sonata".					
24 September; 03:38:30	(United States) Falcon 9 Block 5	Starlink Group 6-18	(United States) Cape Canaveral SLC-40		(United States) SpaceX	
24 September; 03:38:30	(United States) Starlink × 22	SpaceX	Low Earth	Communications	In orbit	Operational
25 September; 08:48:20	(United States) Falcon 9 Block 5	Starlink Group 7-3	(United States) Vandenberg SLC-4E		(United States) SpaceX	
25 September; 08:48:20	(United States) Starlink × 21	SpaceX	Low Earth	Communications	In orbit	Operational
26 September; 20:15	(China) Long March 4C	4C-Y54	(China) Jiuquan SLS-2		(China) CASC	
26 September; 20:15	(China) Yaogan 33-04	CAS	Low Earth (SSO)	Earth observation	In orbit	Operational
27 September ≈06:00	(Iran) Qased		(Iran) Shahroud Space Center		(Iran) IRGC	
27 September ≈06:00	⚀ (Iran) Noor-3	IRGC	Low Earth	Reconnaissance	16 August 2024	Successful
30 September; 02:00	(United States) Falcon 9 Block 5	Starlink Group 6-19	(United States) Cape Canaveral SLC-40		(United States) SpaceX	
30 September; 02:00	(United States) Starlink × 22	SpaceX	Low Earth	Communications	In orbit	Operational

- ← Jan
- Feb
- Mar
- Apr
- May
- Jun
- Jul
- Aug
- Sep
- Oct
- Nov
- Dec →

=== October ===
Date and time (UTC)	Rocket	Flight number	Launch site		LSP	
Date and time (UTC)	Payload (⚀ = CubeSat)	Operator	Orbit	Function	Decay (UTC)	Outcome
Date and time (UTC)	Remarks					
5 October; 00:24	(China) Long March 2D	2D-Y84	(China) Xichang LC-3		(China) CASC	
5 October; 00:24	(China) Yaogan 39-03A	CAS	Low Earth	Reconnaissance	In orbit	Operational
5 October; 00:24	(China) Yaogan 39-03B	CAS	Low Earth	Reconnaissance	In orbit	Operational
5 October; 00:24	(China) Yaogan 39-03C	CAS	Low Earth	Reconnaissance	In orbit	Operational
5 October; 05:36:30	(United States) Falcon 9 Block 5	Starlink Group 6-21	(United States) Cape Canaveral SLC-40		(United States) SpaceX	
5 October; 05:36:30	(United States) Starlink × 22	SpaceX	Low Earth	Communications	In orbit	Operational
6 October; 18:06	(United States) Atlas V 501	AV-104	(United States) Cape Canaveral SLC-41		(United States) ULA	
6 October; 18:06	(United States) KuiperSat-1	Kuiper Systems (Amazon)	Low Earth	Technology demonstration	In orbit	Operational
6 October; 18:06	(United States) KuiperSat-2	Kuiper Systems (Amazon)	Low Earth	Technology demonstration	In orbit	Operational
6 October; 18:06	First of nine Atlas V launches for Amazon's Project Kuiper broadband satellite internet constellation. Mission Designated "Project Kuiper Protoflight". Last flight of the 501 configuration.					
9 October; 01:36	(Italy) Vega	VV23	(France) Kourou ELV		(France) Arianespace	
9 October; 01:36	(Thailand) THEOS-2	GISTDA	Low Earth (SSO)	Earth observation	In orbit	Operational
9 October; 01:36	(Taiwan) TRITON	NSPO	Low Earth (SSO)	Meteorology	In orbit	Operational
9 October; 01:36	⚀ (Spain) ANSER-Leader	INTA	Low Earth (SSO)	Earth observation	9 October	Deployment failure
9 October; 01:36	⚀ (Spain) ANSER-Follower 1	INTA	Low Earth (SSO)	Earth observation	In orbit	Operational
9 October; 01:36	⚀ (Spain) ANSER-Follower 2	INTA	Low Earth (SSO)	Earth observation	In orbit	Operational
9 October; 01:36	⚀ (Netherlands) CSC-1	ISISPACE	Low Earth (SSO)	Payload hosting	In orbit	Operational
9 October; 01:36	⚀ (Netherlands) CSC-2	ISISPACE	Low Earth (SSO)	Payload hosting	In orbit	Operational
9 October; 01:36	⚀ (Estonia) ESTCube-2	Estonian Student Satellite Foundation / Tartu Observatory	Low Earth (SSO)	Technology demonstration	9 October	Deployment failure
9 October; 01:36	⚀ (Luxembourg) MACSAT	OQ Technology	Low Earth (SSO)	IoT	In orbit	Operational
9 October; 01:36	⚀ (France) N3SS	CNES / U-Space	Low Earth (SSO)	Technology demonstration	In orbit	Operational
9 October; 01:36	⚀ (Austria) PRETTY	ESA / TU Graz	Low Earth (SSO)	Earth observation	In orbit	Operational
9 October; 01:36	⚀ (Belgium) PROBA V-CC	ESA / Aerospacelab	Low Earth (SSO)	Earth observation	In orbit	Operational
9 October; 01:36	Small Satellites Mission Service (SSMS) #5 rideshare mission.					
9 October; 07:43	(United States) Falcon 9 Block 5	Starlink Group 7-4	(United States) Vandenberg SLC-4E		(United States) SpaceX	
9 October; 07:43	(United States) Starlink × 21	SpaceX	Low Earth	Communications	In orbit	Operational
13 October; 14:19:43	(United States) Falcon Heavy	FH-008	(United States) Kennedy LC-39A		(United States) SpaceX	
13 October; 14:19:43	(United States) Psyche	NASA	Heliocentric	Asteroid orbiter	In orbit	En route
13 October; 14:19:43	First NASA Mission on a Falcon Heavy.					
13 October; 23:01:10	(United States) Falcon 9 Block 5	Starlink Group 6-22	(United States) Cape Canaveral SLC-40		(United States) SpaceX	
13 October; 23:01:10	(United States) Starlink × 22	SpaceX	Low Earth	Communications	In orbit	Operational
15 October; 00:54	(China) Long March 2D	2D-Y77	(China) Jiuquan SLS-2		(China) CASC	
15 October; 00:54	(China) Yunhai-1 04	SAST	Low Earth (SSO)	Meteorology	In orbit	Operational
18 October; 00:39:00	(United States) Falcon 9 Block 5	Starlink Group 6-23	(United States) Cape Canaveral SLC-40		(United States) SpaceX	
18 October; 00:39:00	(United States) Starlink × 22	SpaceX	Low Earth	Communications	In orbit	Operational
21 October; 08:23	(United States) Falcon 9 Block 5	Starlink Group 7-5	(United States) Vandenberg SLC-4E		(United States) SpaceX	
21 October; 08:23	(United States) Starlink × 21	SpaceX	Low Earth	Communications	In orbit	Operational
22 October; 02:17	(United States) Falcon 9 Block 5	Starlink Group 6-24	(United States) Cape Canaveral SLC-40		(United States) SpaceX	
22 October; 02:17	(United States) Starlink × 23	SpaceX	Low Earth	Communications	In orbit	Operational
23 October; 20:03	(China) Long March 2D	2D-Y85	(China) Xichang LC-3		(China) CASC	
23 October; 20:03	(China) Yaogan 39-04A	CAS	Low Earth	Reconnaissance	In orbit	Operational
23 October; 20:03	(China) Yaogan 39-04B	CAS	Low Earth	Reconnaissance	In orbit	Operational
23 October; 20:03	(China) Yaogan 39-04C	CAS	Low Earth	Reconnaissance	In orbit	Operational
26 October; 03:14:02	(China) Long March 2F/G	2F-Y17	(China) Jiuquan SLS-1		(China) CASC	
26 October; 03:14:02	(China) Shenzhou 17	CMSA	Low Earth (TSS)	Crewed spaceflight	30 April 2024; 09:46	Successful
26 October; 03:14:02	Sixth crewed flight to the Tiangong space station.					
27 October; 06:04:43	(Russia) Soyuz-2.1b		(Russia) Plesetsk Site 43/3		(Russia) RVSN RF	
27 October; 06:04:43	(Russia) Kosmos 2570 (Lotos-S1 №7)	VKS	Low Earth	ELINT	In orbit	Operational
27 October; 06:04:43	(Russia) Kosmos 2571	VKS	Low Earth	TBA	In orbit	Operational
27 October; 06:04:43	(Russia) Kosmos 2571 Subsat	VKS	Low Earth	TBA	In orbit	Operational
27 October; 06:04:43	The secondary payload was released by the Lotos-S1 satellite a few days after the launch.					
29 October; 09:00:00	(United States) Falcon 9 Block 5	Starlink Group 7-6	(United States) Vandenberg SLC-4E		(United States) SpaceX	
29 October; 09:00:00	(United States) Starlink × 22	SpaceX	Low Earth	Communications	In orbit	Operational
30 October; 23:20:30	(United States) Falcon 9 Block 5	Starlink Group 6-25	(United States) Cape Canaveral SLC-40		(United States) SpaceX	
30 October; 23:20:30	(United States) Starlink × 23	SpaceX	Low Earth	Communications	In orbit	Operational
31 October; 22:50	(China) Long March 6A	6A-Y4	(China) Taiyuan LA-9A		(China) CASC	
31 October; 22:50	(China) Tianhui 5A	CNSA	Low Earth (SSO)	Earth observation	In orbit	Operational
31 October; 22:50	(China) Tianhui 5B	CNSA	Low Earth (SSO)	Earth observation	In orbit	Operational

- ← Jan
- Feb
- Mar
- Apr
- May
- Jun
- Jul
- Aug
- Sep
- Oct
- Nov
- Dec →

=== November ===
Date and time (UTC)	Rocket	Flight number	Launch site		LSP	
Date and time (UTC)	Payload (⚀ = CubeSat)	Operator	Orbit	Function	Decay (UTC)	Outcome
Date and time (UTC)	Remarks					
3 November; 14:54	(China) Long March 7A	7A-Y6	(China) Wenchang LC-2		(China) CASC	
3 November; 14:54	(China) TJS-10	SAST	Geosynchronous	Technology demonstration	In orbit	Operational
4 November; 00:37:20	(United States) Falcon 9 Block 5	Starlink Group 6-26	(United States) Cape Canaveral SLC-40		(United States) SpaceX	
4 November; 00:37:20	(United States) Starlink × 23	SpaceX	Low Earth	Communications	In orbit	Operational
8 November; 05:05:30	(United States) Falcon 9 Block 5	Starlink Group 6-27	(United States) Cape Canaveral SLC-40		(United States) SpaceX	
8 November; 05:05:30	(United States) Starlink × 23	SpaceX	Low Earth	Communications	In orbit	Operational
9 November; 11:23	(China) Long March 3B/E	3B-Y94	(China) Xichang LC-2		(China) CASC	
9 November; 11:23	(China) ChinaSat 6E	China Satcom	Geosynchronous	Communications	In orbit	Operational
9 November; 11:23	The satellite will replace ChinaSat 6B.					
10 November; 01:28:14	(United States) Falcon 9 Block 5	F9-271	(United States) Kennedy LC-39A		(United States) SpaceX	
10 November; 01:28:14	(United States) SpaceX CRS-29	NASA	Low Earth (ISS)	ISS logistics	22 December; 17:33	Successful
10 November; 01:28:14	(United States) AWE	Space Dynamics Laboratory	Low Earth (ISS)	Atmospheric research	In orbit	Operational
10 November; 01:28:14	(United States) ILLUMA-T	NASA	Low Earth (ISS)	Communications	In orbit	Operational
10 November; 01:28:14	⚀ (Japan) BEAK	University of Tokyo / Nihon University / JAXA	Low Earth	Technology demonstration	In orbit	Operational
10 November; 01:28:14	⚀ (Japan) Clark Sat-1 AMBITIOUS	Clark Memorial International High School / UT / ArkEdge Space	Low Earth	Educational	In orbit	Operational
10 November; 01:28:14	NASA's Atmospheric Waves Experiment (AWE) instrument will be delivered to the ISS on this flight. BEAK and Clark sat-1 were deployed into orbit from the ISS on 18 December 2023.					
11 November; 18:49:00	(United States) Falcon 9 Block 5	Transporter-9	(United States) Vandenberg SLC-4E		(United States) SpaceX	
11 November; 18:49:00	(Italy) ION SCV-013 Ultimate Hugo	D-Orbit	Low Earth (SSO)	CubeSat deployer	In orbit	Operational
11 November; 18:49:00	(United States) Mira 2 (LEO Express-1)	Impulse Space	Low Earth (SSO)	Space tug	In orbit	Operational
11 November; 18:49:00	(France) SpaceVan	Exotrail	Low Earth (SSO)	Space tug	In orbit	Operational
11 November; 18:49:00	(Canada) Aether-1	Kepler	Low Earth (SSO)	Communications	In orbit	Operational
11 November; 18:49:00	(Canada) Aether-2	Kepler	Low Earth (SSO)	Communications	In orbit	Operational
11 November; 18:49:00	(United States) FalconSAT-X	USAFA	Low Earth (SSO)	Technology demonstration	In orbit	Operational
11 November; 18:49:00	(Finland) ICEYE × 4	ICEYE	Low Earth (SSO)	Earth observation	In orbit	Operational
11 November; 18:49:00	(United States) Pelican-1	Planet Labs	Low Earth (SSO)	Earth observation	In orbit	Operational
11 November; 18:49:00	(United States) Umbra-07	Umbra Lab	Low Earth (SSO)	Earth observation	In orbit	Operational
11 November; 18:49:00	(United States) Umbra-08	Umbra Lab	Low Earth (SSO)	Earth observation	In orbit	Operational
11 November; 18:49:00	⚀ (United States) B1B2 Barry	Rogue Space Systems	Low Earth (SSO)	Debris removal	In orbit	Spacecraft failure
11 November; 18:49:00	⚀ (France) BRO-10	UnseenLabs	Low Earth (SSO)	SIGINT	In orbit	Operational
11 November; 18:49:00	⚀ (France) BRO-11	UnseenLabs	Low Earth (SSO)	SIGINT	In orbit	Operational
11 November; 18:49:00	⚀ (Turkey) Connecta T3.1	Plan-S	Low Earth (SSO)	IoT	In orbit	Operational
11 November; 18:49:00	⚀ (Turkey) Connecta T3.2	Plan-S	Low Earth (SSO)	IoT	In orbit	Operational
11 November; 18:49:00	⚀ (United States) Crypto3	Cryptosat	Low Earth (SSO)	Blockchain	In orbit	Operational
11 November; 18:49:00	⚀ Djibouti-1A	University of Djibouti	Low Earth (SSO)	Meteorology	In orbit	Operational
11 November; 18:49:00	⚀ (Sweden) (Canada) EPICHyper-3 (Wyvern-3)	AAC Clyde Space / Wyvern	Low Earth (SSO)	Earth observation	In orbit	Awaiting deployment
11 November; 18:49:00	⚀ (United States) Flock 4q × 36	Planet Labs	Low Earth (SSO)	Earth observation	In orbit	Operational
11 November; 18:49:00	⚀ (United States) GENMAT-1	GenMat	Low Earth (SSO)	Earth observation	In orbit	Operational
11 November; 18:49:00	⚀ (Canada) GHGSat × 3	GHGSat	Low Earth (SSO)	Earth observation	In orbit	Operational
11 November; 18:49:00	⚀ (United States) Gossamer-Vendelinus (Picacho)	LunaSonde	Low Earth (SSO)	Earth observation	11 November	Deployment failure
11 November; 18:49:00	⚀ (Canada) HERON Mk. II	University of Toronto	Low Earth (SSO)	Amateur radio	In orbit	Operational
11 November; 18:49:00	⚀ (Poland) Intuition-1	AAC Clyde Space / KP Labs	Low Earth (SSO)	Earth observation	In orbit	Operational
11 November; 18:49:00	⚀ (Taiwan) IRIS-C2 (Taurus-1)	NCKU / SATORO	Low Earth (SSO)	Technology demonstration	2025-08-17	Success
11 November; 18:49:00	⚀ (South Korea) JINJUSat-1	CONTEC Co.	Low Earth (SSO)	Earth observation	11 November	Deployment failure
11 November; 18:49:00	⚀ (South Korea) KAFASAT	KAFA	Low Earth (SSO)	Earth observation	In orbit	Operational
11 November; 18:49:00	⚀ (United States) Lemur-2 × 8	Spire Global	Low Earth (SSO)	Technology demonstration	In orbit	Operational
11 November; 18:49:00	⚀ (Spain) MANTIS	Open Cosmos / Satlantis	Low Earth (SSO)	Earth observation	In orbit	Operational
11 November; 18:49:00	⚀ (Japan) NinjaSat	Riken	Low Earth (SSO)	X-ray astronomy	In orbit	Operational
11 November; 18:49:00	⚀ (South Korea) Observer-1A	Nara Space	Low Earth (SSO)	Earth observation	In orbit	Operational
11 November; 18:49:00	⚀ (United Kingdom) OrbAstro TR1	OrbAstro	Low Earth	Technology demonstration	In orbit	Operational
11 November; 18:49:00	⚀ (United Kingdom) OrbAstro PC1	OrbAstro	Low Earth	Technology demonstration	In orbit	Operational
11 November; 18:49:00	⚀ (United States) OMNI-LER1	Internet Think Tank	Low Earth (SSO)	Technology demonstration	In orbit	Operational
11 November; 18:49:00	⚀ (United States) OSW Cazorla	Odyssey SpaceWorks	Low Earth (SSO)	Astrobiology	In orbit	Operational
11 November; 18:49:00	⚀ (United States) Outpost Mission 2	Outpost Space	Low Earth (SSO)	Technology demonstration	In orbit	Operational
11 November; 18:49:00	⚀ (Taiwan) PEARL-1C	Foxconn	Low Earth (SSO)	Technology demonstration	In orbit	Operational
11 November; 18:49:00	⚀ (Taiwan) PEARL-1H	Foxconn	Low Earth (SSO)	Technology demonstration	In orbit	Operational
11 November; 18:49:00	⚀ (Italy) PiCo-IoT × 9	Apogeo Space	Low Earth (SSO)	IoT	In orbit	Operational
11 November; 18:49:00	⚀ (Spain) PLATERO	Regional Government of Andalusia	Low Earth (SSO)	Earth observation	In orbit	Operational
11 November; 18:49:00	⚀ (Bulgaria) Platform 5	EnduroSat	Low Earth (SSO)	Payload hosting	In orbit	Operational
11 November; 18:49:00	⚀ (France) ProtoMéthée-1	PROMÉTHÉE Earth Intelligence	Low Earth (SSO)	Earth observation	In orbit	Operational
11 November; 18:49:00	⚀ (Belgium) SPIP	University of Melbourne	Low Earth (SSO)	Earth observation	In orbit	Operational
11 November; 18:49:00	⚀ (Poland) (Oman) STORK-7 / Aman-1	SatRevolution / ETCO	Low Earth (SSO)	Earth observation	11 November	Deployment failure
11 November; 18:49:00	⚀ (Luxembourg) Tiger-5	OQ Technology	Low Earth (SSO)	IoT	In orbit	Operational
11 November; 18:49:00	⚀ (Luxembourg) Tiger-6	OQ Technology	Low Earth (SSO)	IoT	In orbit	Operational
11 November; 18:49:00	⚀ (United States) Time We'll Tell	TrustPoint	Low Earth (SSO)	Navigation	In orbit	Operational
11 November; 18:49:00	⚀ (Slovakia) (Czech Republic) Veronika	Spacemanic / TU Košice	Low Earth (SSO)	Earth observation	In orbit	Operational
11 November; 18:49:00	⚀ (Sweden) (United States) Ymir-1	AAC Clyde Space / Saab AB / Orbcomm	Low Earth (SSO)	Technology demonstration	In orbit	Awaiting deployment
11 November; 18:49:00	▫ (Turkey) Hello Test 1	Hello Space	Low Earth (SSO)	Technology demonstration	In orbit	Operational
11 November; 18:49:00	▫ (Turkey) Hello Test 2	Hello Space	Low Earth (SSO)	Technology demonstration	In orbit	Operational
11 November; 18:49:00	▫ (Spain) Hydra-1 / HADES-2	Hydra Space / AMSAT EA	Low Earth (SSO)	Amateur radio	In orbit	Operational
11 November; 18:49:00	▫ (Romania) ROM-3	FRR	Low Earth (SSO)	Amateur radio	In orbit	Operational
11 November; 18:49:00	▫ (Malaysia) SpaceANT-D	SpaceIn	Low Earth (SSO)	IoT	In orbit	Awaiting deployment
11 November; 18:49:00	▫ (United States) Tartan-Artibeus-2	CMU	Low Earth (SSO)	Technology demonstration	In orbit	Awaiting deployment
11 November; 18:49:00	▫ (United Kingdom) Unicorn-2J	Alba Orbital	Low Earth (SSO)	Earth observation	In orbit	Operational
11 November; 18:49:00	▫ (United Kingdom) Unicorn-2K	Alba Orbital	Low Earth (SSO)	Earth observation	In orbit	Operational
11 November; 18:49:00	Dedicated SmallSat Rideshare mission to Sun-synchronous orbit, designated Transporter-9. ION SCV-013 carries KP Labs' Antelope, Genergo's Gen-03, PICOSATS' Radiosat&Beamasat and StarDustMe's SD-2 as hosted payloads. An Alba Cluster mission was launched on this flight. Djibouti-1A is Djibouti's first satellite. Aman-1 is Oman's first satellite.					
12 November; 21:08	(United States) Falcon 9 Block 5	F9-273	(United States) Cape Canaveral SLC-40		(United States) SpaceX	
12 November; 21:08	(Luxembourg) O3b mPOWER 5 (O3b FM25)	SES S.A.	Medium Earth	Communications	In orbit	Operational
12 November; 21:08	(Luxembourg) O3b mPOWER 6 (O3b FM26)	SES S.A.	Medium Earth	Communications	In orbit	Operational
16 November; 03:55	(China) Long March 2C / YZ-1S	2C-Y56	(China) Jiuquan SLS-2		(China) CASC	
16 November; 03:55	(China) Haiyang-3A	Ministry of Natural Resources	Low Earth (SSO)	Oceanography	In orbit	Operational
18 November; 05:05:50	(United States) Falcon 9 Block 5	Starlink Group 6-28	(United States) Cape Canaveral SLC-40		(United States) SpaceX	
18 November; 05:05:50	(United States) Starlink × 23	SpaceX	Low Earth	Communications	In orbit	Operational
20 November; 10:30:40	(United States) Falcon 9 Block 5	Starlink Group 7-7	(United States) Vandenberg SLC-4E		(United States) SpaceX	
20 November; 10:30:40	(United States) Starlink × 22	SpaceX	Low Earth	Communications	In orbit	Operational
21 November; 13:42:28	(North Korea) Chŏllima 1		(North Korea) Sohae		(North Korea) NADA	
21 November; 13:42:28	(North Korea) Malligyong-1 F3	NADA	Low Earth (SSO)	Reconnaissance	In orbit	Operational
21 November; 13:42:28	Third orbital launch attempt of Chollima-1 and first successful launch following two consecutive failures.					
22 November; 07:47:40	(United States) Falcon 9 Block 5	Starlink Group 6-29	(United States) Cape Canaveral SLC-40		(United States) SpaceX	
22 November; 07:47:40	(United States) Starlink × 23	SpaceX	Low Earth	Communications	In orbit	Operational
23 November; 10:00:08	(China) Long March 2D / YZ-3	2D-Y59	(China) Xichang LC-3		(China) CASC	
23 November; 10:00:08	(China) Hulianwang Jishu Shiyan 2A	CAS	Low Earth	Communications	In orbit	Operational
23 November; 10:00:08	(China) Hulianwang Jishu Shiyan 2B	CAS	Low Earth	Communications	In orbit	Operational
23 November; 10:00:08	(China) Hulianwang Jishu Shiyan 2C	CAS	Low Earth	Communications	In orbit	Operational
23 November; 10:00:08	It is part of the Guowang (Xingwang) constellation.					
25 November; 20:58:07	(Russia) Soyuz-2.1b		(Russia) Plesetsk Site 43/4		(Russia) RVSN RF	
25 November; 20:58:07	(Russia) Kosmos 2572 (Razdan №1)	VKS	Low Earth (SSO)	Reconnaissance	In orbit	Operational
28 November; 04:20:00	(United States) Falcon 9 Block 5	Starlink Group 6-30	(United States) Cape Canaveral SLC-40		(United States) SpaceX	
28 November; 04:20:00	(United States) Starlink × 23	SpaceX	Low Earth	Communications	In orbit	Operational

- ← Jan
- Feb
- Mar
- Apr
- May
- Jun
- Jul
- Aug
- Sep
- Oct
- Nov
- Dec →

=== December ===
Date and time (UTC)	Rocket	Flight number	Launch site		LSP	
Date and time (UTC)	Payload (⚀ = CubeSat)	Operator	Orbit	Function	Decay (UTC)	Outcome
Date and time (UTC)	Remarks					
1 December; 09:25:11	(Russia) Soyuz-2.1a		(Kazakhstan) Baikonur Site 31/6		(Russia) Roscosmos	
1 December; 09:25:11	(Russia) Progress MS-25 / 86P	Roscosmos	Low Earth (ISS)	ISS logistics	29 May 2024; 11:48	Successful
1 December; 09:25:11	The Payload fairing of the Progress MS-25 mission carried an insignia dedicated to the 35th anniversary of the Buran reusable orbiter flight on 15 Nov. 1988. The rocket also carried logos dedicated to the 100th birthday anniversary of Aleksandr Maksimov, the first chief of the Main Space Assets Directorate of the Russian Ministry of Defense.					
1 December; 18:19	(United States) Falcon 9 Block 5	F9-278	(United States) Vandenberg SLC-4E		(United States) SpaceX	
1 December; 18:19	(South Korea) KORSAT-7 (425 Project EO/IR Sat 1)	DAPA	Low Earth (SSO)	EO/IR Reconnaissance	In orbit	Operational
1 December; 18:19	(Italy) ION SCV-015 Daring Diego	D-Orbit	Low Earth (SSO)	CubeSat deployer	In orbit	Operational
1 December; 18:19	(United States) Bane	York Space Systems	Low Earth (SSO)	Technology demonstration	In orbit	Operational
1 December; 18:19	(United States) GNOMES-4	PlanetIQ	Low Earth (SSO)	Radio occultation	In orbit	Operational
1 December; 18:19	(Japan) KOYOH	Kanazawa University	Low Earth (SSO)	X-ray astronomy	In orbit	Operational
1 December; 18:19	(Italy) μHETSat	SITAEL, ESA	Low Earth (SSO)	Technology demonstration	In orbit	Operational
1 December; 18:19	⚀ (Spain) ALISIO-1	IAC	Low Earth (SSO)	Earth observation	In orbit	Operational
1 December; 18:19	⚀ (Republic of Ireland) EIRSAT-1	UCD / QUB	Low Earth (SSO)	Technology demonstration	4 September 2025	Successful
1 December; 18:19	⚀ (France) ENSO (ROBUSTA 1E)	University of Montpellier	Low Earth (SSO)	Technology demonstration	9 November 2025	Successful
1 December; 18:19	⚀ (Armenia) Hayasat-1	Bazoomq	Low Earth (SSO)	Technology demonstration	24 April 2025	Successful
1 December; 18:19	⚀ (Taiwan) Lilium-1	UNISEC Taiwan	Low Earth (SSO)	Technology demonstration	In orbit	Operational
1 December; 18:19	⚀ (Thailand) LOGSATS	Patriot Infovention	Low Earth (SSO)	IoT	In orbit	Operational
1 December; 18:19	⚀ (Germany) NanoFF A	TU Berlin	Low Earth (SSO)	Technology demonstration	In orbit	Operational
1 December; 18:19	⚀ (Germany) NanoFF B	TU Berlin	Low Earth (SSO)	Technology demonstration	In orbit	Operational
1 December; 18:19	⚀ (Australia) SpIRIT	University of Melbourne	Low Earth (SSO)	Gamma-ray astronomy	In orbit	Operational
1 December; 18:19	▫ (Argentina) MDQubesat-1	Innova Space	Low Earth (SSO)	IoT	In orbit	Operational
1 December; 18:19	▫ (United Kingdom) Unicorn-2L	Alba Orbital	Low Earth (SSO)	Earth observation	In orbit	Operational
1 December; 18:19	▫ (United Kingdom) Unicorn-2M	Alba Orbital	Low Earth (SSO)	Earth observation	27 February 2026	Successful
1 December; 18:19	▫ (United Kingdom) Unicorn-2N	Alba Orbital	Low Earth (SSO)	Earth observation	3 January 2025	Successful
1 December; 18:19	⚀ 6 undisclosed satellites	TBA	Low Earth (SSO)	TBA	In orbit	Operational
1 December; 18:19	First of Five dedicated launches for DAPA 425 Project (425 Project Flight 1). μHETSat was Previously manifested as a LauncherOne payload. ION SCV-012 carries Polimi's RECS refueling system, Zenno Astronautics' Z01™ SuperTorquer control system, TRL11's MI:1 edge computing system and Privateer's Pono 1 edge computing system as hosted payloads. An Alba Cluster mission was launched on this flight. KOYOH is part of Innovative Satellite Technology Demonstration-3. EIRSAT-1 is Ireland's first satellite.					
3 December; 04:00:50	(United States) Falcon 9 Block 5	Starlink Group 6-31	(United States) Cape Canaveral SLC-40		(United States) SpaceX	
3 December; 04:00:50	(United States) Starlink × 23	SpaceX	Low Earth	Communications	In orbit	Operational
4 December; 04:10	(China) Long March 2C	2C-Y54	(China) Jiuquan SLS-2		(China) CASC	
4 December; 04:10	(Egypt) MisrSat-2	Egyptian Space Agency	Low Earth (SSO)	Earth observation	In orbit	Operational
4 December; 04:10	(China) Xingchi-2A	Ellipse SpaceTime	Low Earth (SSO)	Earth observation	In orbit	Operational
4 December; 04:10	(China) Xingchi-2B	Ellipse SpaceTime	Low Earth (SSO)	Earth observation	In orbit	Operational
4 December; 05:00	(South Korea) Solid-fuel space launch vehicle		(South Korea) Offshore launch platform, Jeju Island		(South Korea) Ministry of National Defense	
4 December; 05:00	(South Korea) S-STEP (Doory-Sat)	Hanwha Aerospace	Low Earth	Technology demonstration	In orbit	Operational
4 December; 05:00	Third and final test launch of the solid-fuel launch projectile developed by the ADD. First case of a civilian-led SAR satellite launch within South Korea.					
4 December; 23:33	(China) Ceres-1	Y9	(China) Jiuquan LS-95A		(China) Galactic Energy	
4 December; 23:33	(China) Tianyan-16	MinoSpace	Low Earth (SSO)	Earth observation	In orbit	Operational
4 December; 23:33	(China) Xingchi-1A	Ellipse SpaceTime	Low Earth (SSO)	Earth observation	In orbit	Operational
4 December; 23:33	Mission designated "We Won't Stop". Return to flight of Ceres-1 after a failed launch attempt on 21 September 2023.					
5 December; 19:24	(China) Jielong 3	Y2	Bo Run Jiu Zhou platform, South China Sea		China Rocket	
5 December; 19:24	(China) Hulianwang Jishu Shiyan 3A (Chuangxin 19)	CAS	Low Earth	Communications	In orbit	Operational
5 December; 19:24	It is part of the Guowang (Xingwang) constellation.					
7 December; 05:07:30	(United States) Falcon 9 Block 5	Starlink Group 6-33	(United States) Cape Canaveral SLC-40		(United States) SpaceX	
7 December; 05:07:30	(United States) Starlink × 23	SpaceX	Low Earth	Communications	In orbit	Operational
8 December; 08:03	(United States) Falcon 9 Block 5	Starlink Group 7-8	(United States) Vandenberg SLC-4E		(United States) SpaceX	
8 December; 08:03	(United States) Starlink × 22	SpaceX	Low Earth	Communications	In orbit	Operational
8 December; 23:39:03	(China) Zhuque-2	Y3	(China) Jiuquan LS-96		(China) LandSpace	
8 December; 23:39:03	(China) Honghu-1	Spacety	Low Earth (SSO)	Technology demonstration	4 March 2025	Successful
8 December; 23:39:03	(China) Honghu-2	Hongqing Technologies	Low Earth (SSO)	Technology demonstration	In orbit	Operational
8 December; 23:39:03	(China) Tianyi 33	Spacety / HNUST	Low Earth (SSO)	Technology demonstration	6 May 2025	Successful
8 December; 23:39:03	Last launch of Zhuque-2, Future launches will happen on upgraded Zhuque-2E.					
10 December; 01:58	(China) Long March 2D	2D-Y86	(China) Xichang LC-3		(China) CASC	
10 December; 01:58	(China) Yaogan 39-05A	CAS	Low Earth	Reconnaissance	In orbit	Operational
10 December; 01:58	(China) Yaogan 39-05B	CAS	Low Earth	Reconnaissance	In orbit	Operational
10 December; 01:58	(China) Yaogan 39-05C	CAS	Low Earth	Reconnaissance	In orbit	Operational
10 December; 01:58	500th launch of Long March series rockets.					
14 December; 14:10	(China) Long March 2F/T	2F-T5	(China) Jiuquan SLS-1		(China) CASC	
14 December; 14:10	(China) Reusable Experimental Spacecraft	CASC	Low Earth	Technology demonstration	6 September 2024	Successful
14 December; 14:10	Third flight of the reusable experimental spacecraft.					
15 December; 04:05	(United States) Electron	"The Moon God Awakens"	(New Zealand) Mahia LC-1B		(United States) Rocket Lab	
15 December; 04:05	(Japan) QPS-SAR-5 (TSUKUYOMI-I)	iQPS	Low Earth	Earth observation	In orbit	Operational
15 December; 04:05	Previously manifested as a LauncherOne payload. Return to flight of Electron following the failed launch of "We Will Never Desert You" on 19 September.					
15 December; 13:41	(China) Long March 5	Y6	(China) Wenchang LC-1		(China) CASC	
15 December; 13:41	(China) Yaogan 41	CAS	Geosynchronous	Reconnaissance	In orbit	Operational
15 December; 13:41	First Long March 5 with Extended Payload Fairing.					
16 December; 09:17:48	(Russia) Soyuz-2.1b / Fregat		(Kazakhstan) Baikonur Site 31/6		(Russia) Roscosmos	
16 December; 09:17:48	(Russia) Arktika-M №2	Roscosmos	Molniya	Meteorology	In orbit	Operational
17 December; 07:00	(China) Hyperbola-1	Y7	(China) Jiuquan LS-95A		(China) i-Space	
17 December; 07:00	(China) DEAR-1	AZSPACE	Low Earth	Reentry capsule	2 October 2025	Successful
17 December; 07:00	DEAR-1 is a prototype recoverable, reusable cargo spacecraft.					
19 December; 04:01	(United States) Falcon 9 Block 5	Starlink Group 6-34	(United States) Cape Canaveral SLC-40		(United States) SpaceX	
19 December; 04:01	(United States) Starlink × 23	SpaceX	Low Earth	Communications	In orbit	Operational
21 December; 08:48:39	(Russia) Soyuz-2.1b		(Russia) Plesetsk Site 43/4		(Russia) RVSN RF	
21 December; 08:48:39	(Russia) Kosmos 2573 (Bars-M 5L)	VKS	Low Earth (SSO)	Reconnaissance	In orbit	Operational
22 December; 17:32	(United States) Firefly Alpha	FLTA004	(United States) Vandenberg SLC-2W		(United States) Firefly	
22 December; 17:32	(United States) Tantrum	Lockheed Martin	Low Earth	Technology demonstration	10 February 2024 ≈15:00	Partial failure
22 December; 17:32	Mission designated "Fly the Lightning".					
23 December; 05:33	(United States) Falcon 9 Block 5	Starlink Group 6-32	(United States) Cape Canaveral SLC-40		(United States) SpaceX	
23 December; 05:33	(United States) Starlink × 23	SpaceX	Low Earth	Communications	In orbit	Operational
23 December; 05:33	First time a Falcon 9 booster B1058 has been reflown 19 times.					
24 December; 13:11	(United States) Falcon 9 Block 5	F9-284	(United States) Vandenberg SLC-4E		(United States) SpaceX	
24 December; 13:11	(Germany) SARah-2	Bundeswehr	Low Earth (SSO)	Reconnaissance	In orbit	Spacecraft failure
24 December; 13:11	(Germany) SARah-3	Bundeswehr	Low Earth (SSO)	Reconnaissance	In orbit	Spacecraft failure
24 December; 13:11	Antennas on both satellites failed to deploy, rendering them inoperable.					
25 December; 01:00	(China) Kuaizhou 1A	Y26	(China) Jiuquan LS-95A		(China) ExPace	
25 December; 01:00	(China) Tianmu-1 11–14	Xiyong Microelectronics	Low Earth (SSO)	Meteorology	In orbit	Operational
25 December; 22:39	(China) Long March 11H	HY5	Bo Run Jiu Zhou platform, South China Sea		(China) CASC	
25 December; 22:39	(China) Shiyan 24C-01	SAST	Low Earth (SSO)	Technology demonstration	In orbit	Operational
25 December; 22:39	(China) Shiyan 24C-02	SAST	Low Earth (SSO)	Technology demonstration	In orbit	Operational
25 December; 22:39	(China) Shiyan 24C-03	SAST	Low Earth (SSO)	Technology demonstration	In orbit	Operational
26 December; 03:26	(China) Long March 3B/E / YZ-1	3B-Y75	(China) Xichang LC-2		(China) CASC	
26 December; 03:26	(China) BeiDou-3 M26 (BeiDou 57)	CNSA	Medium Earth	Navigation	In orbit	Operational
26 December; 03:26	(China) BeiDou-3 M28 (BeiDou 58)	CNSA	Medium Earth	Navigation	In orbit	Operational
27 December; 06:50	(China) Kuaizhou 1A	Y27	(China) Jiuquan LS-95A		(China) ExPace	
27 December; 06:50	(China) Tianmu-1 19–22	Xiyong Microelectronics	Low Earth (SSO)	Meteorology	In orbit	Operational
27 December; 07:33:44	(Russia) Soyuz-2.1v		(Russia) Plesetsk Site 43/4		(Russia) RVSN RF	
27 December; 07:33:44	(Russia) Kosmos 2574 (Razbeg №1)	VKS	Low Earth (SSO)	Reconnaissance	15 November 2025	Successful
29 December; 01:07:00	(United States) Falcon Heavy	FH-009	(United States) Kennedy LC-39A		(United States) SpaceX	
29 December; 01:07:00	(United States) X-37B OTV-7 (USA-349)	DAF RCO / United States Space Force	Highly elliptical HEO	Military communications	7 March 2025; 07:22	Successful
29 December; 01:07:00	USSF-52 mission.					
29 December; 04:01:40	(United States) Falcon 9 Block 5	Starlink Group 6-36	(United States) Cape Canaveral SLC-40		(United States) SpaceX	
29 December; 04:01:40	(United States) Starlink × 23	SpaceX	Low Earth	Communications	In orbit	Operational
30 December; 00:13	(China) Long March 2C / YZ-1S	2C-Y73	(China) Jiuquan SLS-2		(China) CASC	
30 December; 00:13	(China) Hulianwang Jishu Shiyan 4A	CAST	Low Earth	Communications	In orbit	Operational
30 December; 00:13	(China) Hulianwang Jishu Shiyan 4B	CAST	Low Earth	Communications	In orbit	Operational
30 December; 00:13	(China) Hulianwang Jishu Shiyan 4C	CAST	Low Earth	Communications	In orbit	Operational
30 December; 00:13	It is part of the Guowang (Xingwang) constellation.					
← Jan; Feb; Mar; Apr; May; Jun; Jul; Aug; Sep; Oct; Nov; Dec →

== Suborbital flights ==
Date and time (UTC)	Rocket	Flight number	Launch site		LSP	
Date and time (UTC)	Payload (⚀ = CubeSat)	Operator	Orbit	Function	Decay (UTC)	Outcome
Date and time (UTC)	Remarks					
12 July; 00:59	(North Korea) Hwasong-18		(North Korea) Sunan		(North Korea) KPA Strategic Force	
12 July; 00:59	(North Korea)	KPA Strategic Force	Suborbital	Missile test	12 July	Successful
12 July; 00:59	Apogee: 6,648.4 km (4,131.1 mi).					
24 July; 14:54	(North Korea) Unknown missile		(North Korea)		(North Korea) KPA Strategic Force	
24 July; 14:54	(North Korea)	KPA Strategic Force	Suborbital	Missile test	24 July	Successful
24 July; 14:54	Apogee: ~100 km (62 mi).					
24 July; 14:59	(North Korea) Unknown missile		(North Korea)		(North Korea) KPA Strategic Force	
24 July; 14:59	(North Korea)	KPA Strategic Force	Suborbital	Missile test	24 July	Successful
24 July; 14:59	Apogee: ~100 km (62 mi).					
10 August; 15:17:10	(United States) SpaceShipTwo	Galactic 02	(United States) Spaceport America		(United States) Virgin Galactic	
10 August; 15:17:10	(United States) Galactic 02	Virgin Galactic	Suborbital	Crewed spaceflight	10 August; 15:32:48	Successful
10 August; 15:17:10	First VSS Unity flight carrying a private astronaut. Apogee: 88.5 km (55.0 mi).					
12 August	(Turkey) SR-1.0		(Turkey) İğneada		(Turkey) Roketsan	
12 August	(Turkey)	Roketsan	Suborbital	Test flight	12 August	Successful
12 August	Apogee: 550 km (340 mi).					
16 August; 10:21:00	(United States) Terrier-Improved Malemute	ROCKSAT-X 2023	(United States) Wallops Flight Facility		(United States) NASA	
16 August; 10:21:00	(United States) RockSat-X	Colorado Space Grant Consortium	Suborbital	Education	16 August	Launch failure
16 August; 10:21:00	The launch failed because of an anomaly with the second stage of the launch vehicle, contact was lost 41 seconds into the flight.					
17 August; 10:00:00	(United States) Terrier-Improved Orion		(United States) Wallops Flight Facility		(United States) NASA	
17 August; 10:00:00	(United States) RockOn / RockSat-C	Colorado Space Grant Consortium	Suborbital	Education	17 August	Successful
17 August; 10:00:00	Apogee: 116.7 km (72.5 mi).					
19 August	(United States) AGM-183 ARRW		(United States) Boeing B-52 Stratofortress		United States Air Force	
19 August	(United States)	United States Air Force	Suborbital	Missile test	19 August	Successful
6 September; 08:26	(United States) Minuteman III		(United States) Vandenberg LF-10		(United States) AFGSC	
6 September; 08:26	(United States)	AFGSC	Suborbital	Test flight	6 September	Successful
6 September; 08:26	Re-entered ~4,200 mi (6,800 km) downrange near Kwajalein Atoll.					
8 September; 15:22:13	(United States) SpaceShipTwo	Galactic 03	(United States) Spaceport America		(United States) Virgin Galactic	
8 September; 15:22:13	(United States) Galactic 03	Virgin Galactic	Suborbital	Crewed spaceflight	8 September; 15:35	Successful
8 September; 15:22:13	Apogee: 88.6 km (55.1 mi).					
27 September; 21:10	(United States) UGM-133 Trident II	DASO-32	(United States) USS Louisiana, Western Range		United States Navy	
27 September; 21:10	(United States)	United States Navy	Suborbital	Missile test	27 September	Successful
6 October; 16:10:30	(United States) SpaceShipTwo	Galactic 04	(United States) Spaceport America		(United States) Virgin Galactic	
6 October; 16:10:30	(United States) Galactic 04	Virgin Galactic	Suborbital	Crewed spaceflight	6 October; 16:24:53	Successful
6 October; 16:10:30	Apogee: 87.4 km (54.3 mi).					
7 October; 00:19	(Spain) Miura 1	Test Flight	(Spain) El Arenosillo - Médano del Loro		(Spain) PLD Space	
7 October; 00:19	(Germany)	ZARM	Suborbital	Technology demonstration	7 October	Partial Launch Failure
7 October; 00:19	Apogee: 46 km (29 mi). Did not reached intended altitude and the rocket has not been recovered.					
10 October; 08:00:00	(Brazil) VSB-30 (S31/Improved Orion)	HIFLIER 1	(Sweden) Esrange		(Germany) DLR	
10 October; 08:00:00	(Germany) (United States) HIFLIER 1	DLR	Suborbital	Hypersonic test flight	10 October	Successful
10 October; 08:00:00	Apogee: 190 km (120 mi).					
12 October	(United States) AGM-183 ARRW		(United States) Boeing B-52 Stratofortress		United States Air Force	
12 October	(United States)	United States Air Force	Suborbital	Missile test	12 October	Successful
14 October; 16:02:01	(Canada) Black Brant IX		(United States) White Sands Missile Range		(United States) NASA	
14 October; 16:02:01	(United States) APEP / Apophis	ERAU	Suborbital	Atmospheric research	14 October	Successful
14 October; 16:02:01	Apogee: 348 km (216 mi). First of three launches.					
14 October; 16:37:01	(Canada) Black Brant IX		(United States) White Sands Missile Range		(United States) NASA	
14 October; 16:37:01	(United States) APEP / Apophis	ERAU	Suborbital	Atmospheric research	14 October	Successful
14 October; 16:37:01	Apogee: 353 km (219 mi). Second of three launches.					
14 October; 17:12:00	(Canada) Black Brant IX		(United States) White Sands Missile Range		(United States) NASA	
14 October; 17:12:00	(United States) APEP / Apophis	ERAU	Suborbital	Atmospheric research	14 October	Successful
14 October; 17:12:00	Apogee: 352 km (219 mi). Last of three launches.					
18 October	(Pakistan) Ababeel		(Pakistan)		Pakistan Army	
18 October	(Pakistan)	Pakistan Army	Suborbital	Missile test	18 October	Successful
24 October	(Pakistan) Ghauri		(Pakistan)		Pakistan Army	
24 October	(Pakistan)	Pakistan Army	Suborbital	Missile test	24 October	Successful
25 October	(United States) Terrier Oriole	FTM-48	(United States) Barking Sands		United States Navy	
25 October	(United States)	United States Navy	Suborbital	Missile target	25 October	Successful
25 October	Flight Test Aegis Weapon System-48 (FTM-48) test of the Aegis Ballistic Missile Defense System. SM-3 Block IA target.					
25 October	(United States) Terrier Oriole	FTM-48	(United States) Barking Sands		United States Navy	
25 October	(United States)	United States Navy	Suborbital	Missile target	25 October	Successful
25 October	Flight Test Aegis Weapon System-48 (FTM-48) test of the Aegis Ballistic Missile Defense System. SM-3 Block IA target.					
25 October	(United States) SM-3 Block IA	FTM-48	(United States) USS Carl M. Levin, Pacific Ocean		United States Navy	
25 October	(United States) Kill vehicle	United States Navy	Suborbital	Interceptor	25 October	Successful
25 October	Flight Test Aegis Weapon System-48 (FTM-48) test of the Aegis Ballistic Missile Defense System. Successful intercept.					
25 October	(United States) SM-3 Block IA	FTM-48	(United States) USS Carl M. Levin, Pacific Ocean		United States Navy	
25 October	(United States) Kill vehicle	United States Navy	Suborbital	Interceptor	25 October	Successful
25 October	Flight Test Aegis Weapon System-48 (FTM-48) test of the Aegis Ballistic Missile Defense System. Successful intercept.					
25 October	(Russia) RS-24 Yars		(Russia)		(Russia) Russian Ministry of Defence	
25 October	(Russia)	Russian Ministry of Defence	Suborbital	ICBM test	25 October	Successful
25 October	(Russia) RSM-54 Sineva		(Russia) K-114 Tula, Barents Sea		(Russia) Russian Ministry of Defence	
25 October	(Russia)	Russian Ministry of Defence	Suborbital	SLBM test	25 October	Successful
25 October	Hit a target on the Kamchatka Peninsula.					
30 October; 05:45	(Canada) Black Brant IX		(United States) White Sands Missile Range		(United States) NASA	
30 October; 05:45	(United States) INFUSE	CU Boulder	Suborbital	Ultraviolet astronomy	30 October	Successful
30 October; 05:45	Integral Field Ultraviolet Spectroscopic Experiment (INFUSE). Apogee: 266.8 km (165.8 mi).					
31 October	(Yemen) Qader		(Yemen)		(Yemen) Houthis	
31 October	(Yemen) Live warhead	Houthis	Suborbital	Missile launch	31 October	Intercepted
31 October	Warhead was intercepted.					
31 October	(Israel) Arrow 2 Block-4		(Israel)		(Israel) IAI/IDF	
31 October	(Israel)	IAF	Suborbital	Interceptor	31 October	Successful
31 October	Intercepted a ballistic missile launched from Yemen.					
1 November; 07:06	(United States) Minuteman-III		(United States) Vandenberg		United States Air Force	
1 November; 07:06	(United States)	United States Air Force	Suborbital	Missile test	1 November	Launch failure
2 November; 15:44:40	(United States) SpaceShipTwo	Galactic 05	(United States) Spaceport America		(United States) Virgin Galactic	
2 November; 15:44:40	(United States) Galactic 05	Virgin Galactic	Suborbital	Crewed spaceflight	2 November; 15:59	Successful
2 November; 15:44:40	Apogee: 87.2 km (54.2 mi).					
5 November	(Russia) RSM-56 Bulava		(Russia) K-554 Imperator Aleksandr III, White Sea		(Russia) Russian Ministry of Defence	
5 November	(Russia)	Russian Ministry of Defence	Suborbital	SLBM test	5 November	Successful
5 November	Hit a target on the Kamchatka Peninsula.					
8 November; 09:41:00	(United States) Terrier Oriole		(United States) Poker Flat LP-3		(United States) NASA	
8 November; 09:41:00	(United States) DISSIPATION	Goddard Space Flight Center	Suborbital	Thermospheric research	8 November	Successful
9 November; 10:14:00	(Canada) Black Brant XII-A		(United States) Poker Flat LP-4		(United States) NASA	
9 November; 10:14:00	(United States) Beam-PIE	Los Alamos National Laboratory	Suborbital	Technology demonstration	9 November	Successful
15 November	(United States) Terrier Terrier Improved Malemute	H4H 3	(United States) Wallops Flight Facility		(United States) NASA	
15 November	(United States)	Sandia National Laboratories	Suborbital	Technology demonstration	15 November	Successful
15 November	1 of 2. High Operational Tempo for Hypersonics flight campaign. Maiden flight of the Terrier Terrier Improved Malemure sounding rocket.					
15 November	(United States) Terrier Terrier Improved Malemute	H4H 3	(United States) Wallops Flight Facility		(United States) NASA	
15 November	(United States)	Sandia National Laboratories	Suborbital	Technology demonstration	15 November	Successful
15 November	2 of 2. High Operational Tempo for Hypersonics flight campaign.					
18 November; 13:02:53	(United States) Starship	Flight 2	(United States) Starbase OLP-A		(United States) SpaceX	
18 November; 13:02:53	No payload	SpaceX	Transatmospheric	Flight test	18 November	Launch failure
18 November; 13:02:53	Second Starship orbital test flight.					
18 November	(France) M51.3		(France) DGA Essais de missiles		(France) DGA	
18 November	(France)	DGA	Suborbital	Missile test	18 November	Successful
2 December; 07:00:00	(Japan) S-520	S-520-33	(Japan) Uchinoura		(Japan) JAXA	
2 December; 07:00:00	(Japan) RATS-L	JAXA	Suborbital	Technology demonstration	2 December	Successful
2 December; 07:00:00	(Japan) IEP	JAXA	Suborbital	Technology demonstration	2 December	Successful
2 December; 07:00:00	(Japan) PDC	JAXA	Suborbital	Technology demonstration	2 December	Successful
2 December; 07:00:00	(Japan) NANA	JAXA	Suborbital	Technology demonstration	2 December	Successful
2 December; 07:00:00	Apogee: 304 km (189 mi).					
2 December; 07:30:00	(Brazil) VSB-30		(Sweden) Esrange		(Germany) MORABA	
2 December; 07:30:00	(Germany) MAIUS-2	ZARM	Suborbital	Matter wave interferometry	2 December	Successful
2 December; 07:30:00	Second payload launch for the Quantus IV - Maius project. Apogee: 234 km (145 mi).					
6 December	(Iran) Salman		(Iran) Semnan CLP		(Iran) ISA	
6 December	(Iran) Bio-capsule	ISA	Suborbital	Biological science	6 December	Successful
6 December	Maiden flight of the Salman sounding rocket. Apogee: 130 km (81 mi).					
11 December; 14:38?	(United States) IRBM-T1	FTG-12	(United States) Boeing C-17 Globemaster III, Pacific Ocean		(United States) MDA	
11 December; 14:38?	(United States)	MDA	Suborbital	Missile target	11 December	Successful
11 December; 14:38?	Flight Test Ground-Based Midcourse Defense-12 (FTG-12). GBI-OBV target.					
11 December; 14:48?	(United States) GBI-OBV	FTG-12	(United States) Vandenberg LF-24		(United States) MDA	
11 December; 14:48?	(United States)	MDA	Suborbital	Interceptor	11 December	Successful
11 December; 14:48?	Flight Test Ground-Based Midcourse Defense-12 (FTG-12). Successful intercept.					
17 December; 23:24	(North Korea) Hwasong-18		(North Korea) Sunan		(North Korea) KPA Strategic Force	
17 December; 23:24	(North Korea)	KPA Strategic Force	Suborbital	Missile test	17 December	Successful
17 December; 23:24	Apogee: 6,260 km (3,890 mi).					
19 December; 16:42:28	(United States) New Shepard	NS-24	(United States) Corn Ranch		(United States) Blue Origin	
19 December; 16:42:28	(United States) Blue Origin NS-24	Blue Origin	Suborbital	Uncrewed commercial spaceflight	19 December; 16:52:41	Successful
19 December; 16:42:28	(Principality of Sealand) (United States) Postcards	Club For The Future	Suborbital	Education	19 December	Successful
19 December; 16:42:28	Uncrewed return to flight of New Shepard following the failure of the NS-23 mission in September 2022. Apogee: 107 km (66 mi).					
