= North Korean space program =

National space program of North Korea

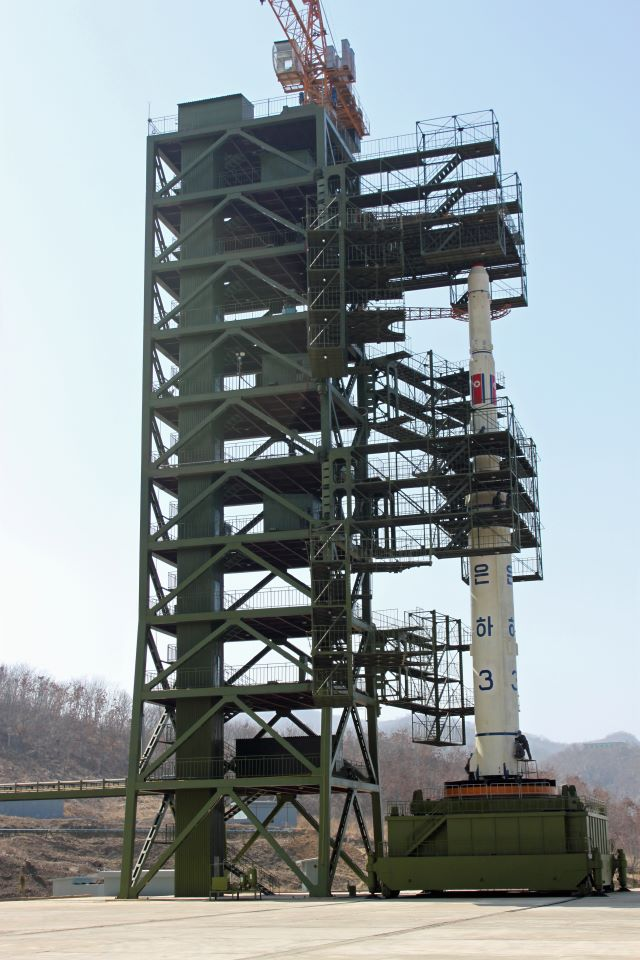
The Unha-3 launch vehicle on the launch pad at Tangachai-ri space center, 2012.

The North Korean space program is the program of the Democratic People's Republic of Korea to develop its space capabilities.

North Korea first claimed to launch the Kwangmyŏngsŏng-1 satellite on the Paektusan launch vehicle in 1998. Between 2006 and 2016, it attempted five satellite launches on Unha launch vehicles. The last two were the country's first successful satellite launches, Kwangmyŏngsŏng-3 Unit 2 and Kwangmyŏngsŏng-4. Between 2023 and 2024, North Korea attempted four launches of Malligyong-1 reconnaissance satellites aboard Chollima-1 launch vehicles, succeeding only on the third attempt.

Unlike its ballistic missile and nuclear weapons programs, North Korea initially attempted to legitimize its space program from 2009 by joining the Outer Space Treaty and Registration Convention. From 2023, it has cooperated on space industry with Russia.

It is regulated by the National Aerospace Technology Administration. Prior to 2013, it was governed by Korean Committee of Space Technology. As of 2023, the program was relatively unsuccessful.

== History ==
The Korean Committee of Space Technology (KCST) was known to have been founded sometime in the 1980s.

State media first mentioned KCST in February 2009, before the launch of Kwangmyŏngsŏng-2. In March 2009, North Korea acceded to the Outer Space Treaty and the Convention on Registration of Objects Launched into Outer Space. This attempt by North Korea to legitimize its space program has been contrasted with the lack of such attempts for its ballistic missile and nuclear weapons programs.

In January 2013, sanctions were imposed to the KCST by United Nations Security Council, issuing Resolution 2087. Three months later, the KCST was dissolved and replaced by newly-formed National Aerospace Development Administration (NADA), which was formed on 1 April 2013.

In 2016, North Korea accepted the Rescue Agreement, an international agreement setting forth rights and obligations of states concerning the rescue of persons in space, as well as the Convention on International Liability for Damage Caused by Space Objects. Additionally, in the same year, United Nations Security Council imposed sanctions to the NADA.

In September 2023, following the 9th Session of the 14th Supreme People's Assembly, the National Aerospace Development Administration was renamed to National Aerospace Technology Administration (NATA).

== Satellite programs ==
=== Kwangmyŏngsŏng program ===
North Korea launched the first satellite, named Kwangmyŏngsŏng-1 on 31 August 1998. On 4 September 1998, North Korea claimed that the launch of Kwangmyŏngsŏng-1 was successful. However, the launch was considered as a failure outside North Korea.

Kwangmyŏngsŏng-2 was launched on 5 April 2009. Similar to the launch of Kwangmyŏngsŏng-1, North Korea claimed successful for the launch, however, the launch was also considered as a failure outside North Korea.

North Korea launched two satellites in 2012: Kwangmyŏngsŏng-3 and Kwangmyŏngsŏng-3 Unit 2. While the Kwangmyŏngsŏng-3 launch was failed in April 2012, eight months later, the second version of this satellite was successfully launched.

Four years later, on 7 February 2016, North Korea successfully launched Kwangmyŏngsŏng-4 satellite.

There are plans to launch another satellite of Kwangmyŏngsŏng program, called Kwangmyŏngsŏng-5.

=== Reconnaissance satellite program ===
Throughout 2022, North Korea tested reconnaissance satellite components four times. These tests occurred on 27 February, 5 March and 18 December 2022 (two tests).

In 2023, North Korea attempted to launch Malligyong-1 reconnaissance satellite three times. While the first and second attempt (in May and August, respectively) failed, the third attempt (in November) was successful.

North Korea planned to launch three more reconnaissance satellites in 2024. However, North Korea ended up launching only one satellite, named Malligyong-1-1 on 27 May 2024 onboard a new launch vehicle using kerolox propellant, which ended in a failure. No other launches were carried out in 2024.

=== Geostationary satellite program ===
In September 2015, NADA disclosed the development of a geostationary satellite.

In September 2016, North Korea tested a liquid-fueled engine for a rocket capable of placing satellites into geostationary orbit.

== Space launch vehicles ==
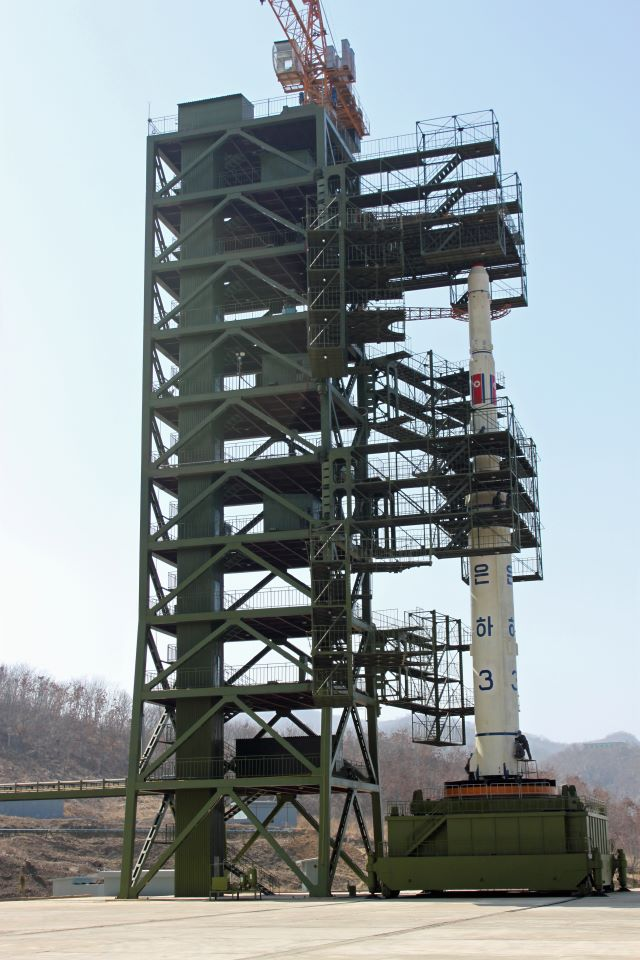
Unha-3 rocket on 8 April 2012 in Sohae

=== Paektusan-1 ===
The North Korea's first orbital space launch vehicle. United States classified the SLV as a technology demonstrator for long-range ballistic missile technology and dubbed "Taepodong-1".

=== Unha rocket family ===
The Unha is a North Korea family of expendable carrier rockets. These rocket have a wider first stage, comparable to that of the Iranian Simorgh.

=== Chollima-1 ===
Chollima-1 is a three-stage rocket, the first stage is utilizing same engine used on Hwasong-15 is based on the Hwasong-17 ICBM.

=== Kerolox-propelled launch vehicle ===
It is a new launch vehicle using liquid oxygen and petroleum (kerosene) propellants. North Korea refers to this rocket as "new-type satellite carrier rocket" without disclosing official name.

== Launch history ==
Launch history
Satellite	Launch date (UTC)	Rocket	Launch site	Status	Purpose
Kwangmyŏngsŏng-1	31 August 1998	Paektusan	Tonghae Satellite Launching Ground	Success (North Korea); Failure (outside North Korea)	Technology experimental satellite
	4 July 2006	Unha-1		Failure	Rocket test (See 2006 North Korean missile test)
Kwangmyŏngsŏng-2	5 April 2009	Unha-2	Tonghae Satellite Launching Ground	Success (North Korea); Failure (outside North Korea)	Communications satellite
Kwangmyŏngsŏng-3	13 April 2012	Unha-3	Sohae Satellite Launching Station	Failure	Observation satellite
Kwangmyŏngsŏng-3 Unit 2	12 December 2012	Unha-3	Sohae Satellite Launching Station	Success	Observation satellite
Kwangmyŏngsŏng-4	7 February 2016	Kwangmyŏngsŏng (Unha-3)	Sohae Satellite Launching Station	Success	Observation satellite
Malligyong-1 #1	30 May 2023	Chollima-1	Sohae Satellite Launching Station	Failure	Military reconnaissance satellite
Malligyong-1 #2	23 August 2023	Chollima-1	Sohae Satellite Launching Station	Failure	Military reconnaissance satellite
Malligyong-1 #3	21 November 2023	Chollima-1	Sohae Satellite Launching Station	Success	Military reconnaissance satellite
Malligyong-1-1	27 May 2024	Unnamed (using kerolox propellant)	Sohae Satellite Launching Station	Failure	Military reconnaissance satellite

== Deep space exploration program ==
The future Unha-20 will be able to place 20 tons into low Earth orbit and can be used by North Korea for its deep space exploration program, to explore the Moon, Mars, and other destinations.

=== Lunar exploration program ===
The North Korea's lunar exploration program (조선달탐사) is the planned lunar exploration mission of North Korea.

==== Phase 1: Lunar Orbiter ====
South Korean internet newspaper Jaju Minbo carried an article on 23 March 2012 stating that the Democratic People's Republic of Korea is likely to launch a lunar exploration satellite.

==== Phase 2: Lunar Lander ====
In an interview with The Associated Press, a senior official said on 4 August 2016 that North Korea will begin designing a lunar orbiter and lunar lander immediately after launching a geostationary communications satellite as planned in the Second Space Development Five-Year Plan.

North Korea has stated its ambition to land a probe on the Moon.

==== Phase 3: Lunar Sample Return Mission ====
As a prerequisite paving the way for a crewed Moon landing, the third phase of the North Korea's lunar exploration program would be to return rock samples to Earth with a robotic probe as illustrated by an orbital trajectory schematic seen in 2015 at the Pyongyang Science-Technology Complex. Planned for a launch sometime after 2026, the mission will use a heavy Unha-20 booster able to place it into a lunar trajectory orbit. The landing of the return capsule would be in the Pacific Ocean.

=== Mars exploration program ===
The North Korea's Mars exploration program (조선화성탐사) is the planned Mars exploration mission of North Korea.

Hyon Kwang Il, director of the scientific research department of the Democratic People's Republic of Korea's National Aerospace Development Administration, said that North Korea also intends "to do manned spaceflight and scientific experiments in space, make a flight to the moon and moon exploration and also exploration to other planets."

== Future projects ==
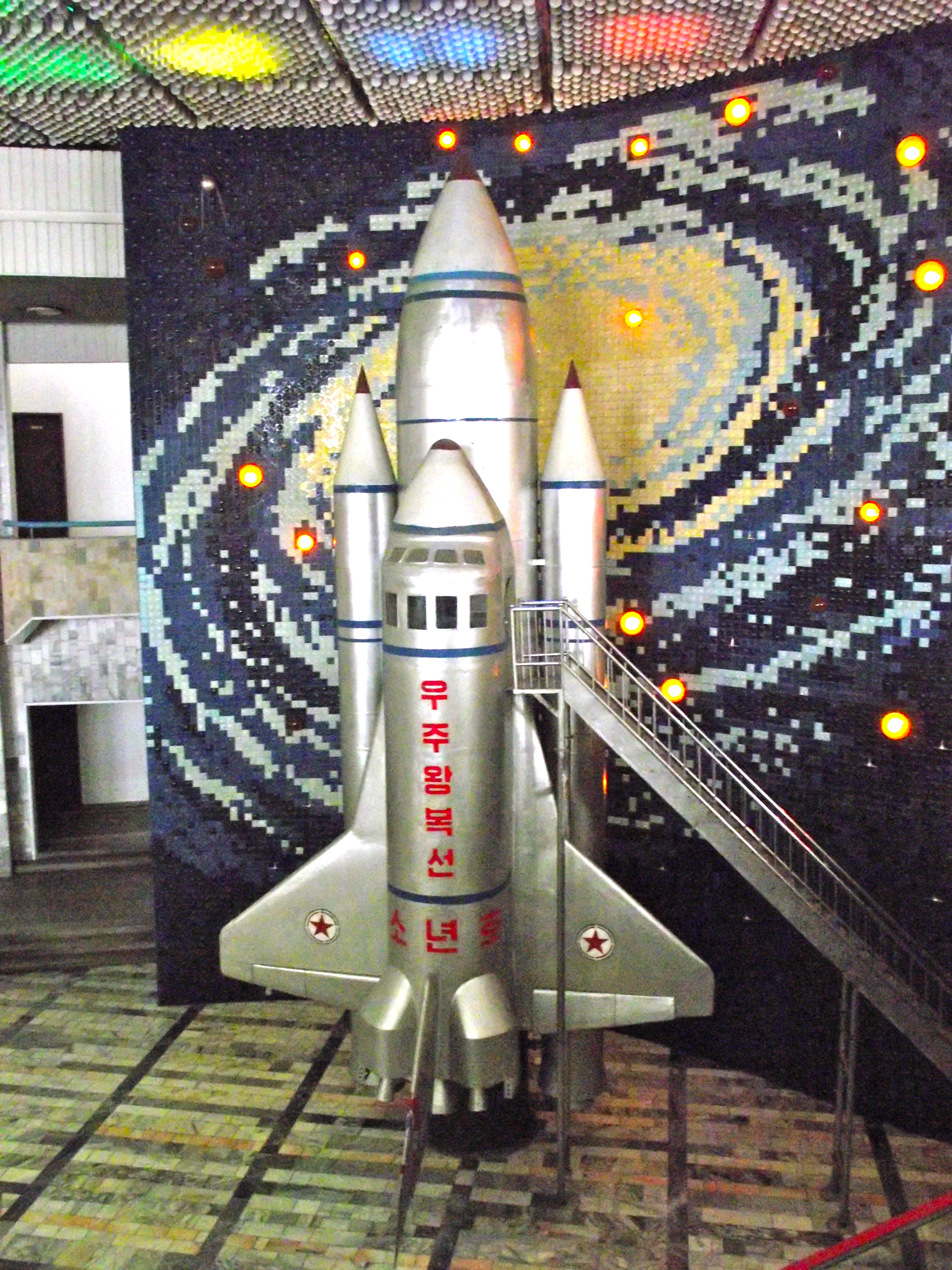
Mockup of future DPRK shuttle at Mangyongdae Children's Palace

In 2009, the Democratic People's Republic of Korea announced more ambitious future space projects, including its own crewed space flights and the development of a partially reusable crewed shuttle launch vehicle mockup, which was displayed at Mangyongdae Children's Palace.

In 2016, Hyon Kwang Il, director of NADA's scientific research department, said they planned to launch more satellites before 2020, including a geostationary satellite. He also said that he hoped they would "plant the flag of the DPRK on the moon" within 10 years.

In 2017, NADA officials unveiled two proposals for upcoming satellites, one of which is an Earth remote-exploration satellite weighing over 100 kg, with spatial resolution capabilities of several meters. The second is a satellite in a proposed geostationary orbit for communication, with an estimated weight of at least one short ton. Various media outlets have reported that North Korea was in the process of completing one of the two satellites, dubbed "Kwangmyongsong-5", however the expected launch date has yet to be determined.

== Law of Space Development ==
The Law on Space Development was passed in the 7th session of the 12th Supreme People's Assembly, held on 1 April 2013. Originally, the law has 23 articles, but the most recent law (as of 2023) has 48 articles.

The law sets out the North Korean principles of the development of space capabilities as it relates to the principles of the North Korean Juche ideology and independence, as well as the aim of solving scientific and technological problems of space exploration to improve its economy, science, and technology. The law also regulates the position of NATA and the principles of notification, security, research, and possibly compensation in relation to satellite launches. The law calls for the cooperation with international organizations and other countries, equality and mutual benefit, and respect for international law and international regulations for space.

The law formerly opposed the militarization of space; however, in 2022, the law was revised to permit the usage of space for defense purposes.

== Sources ==
- Harrison, Richard M.; Retherford, Cody; Garretson, Peter A. (2023). "Challenges to U.S. Space Security". The Next Space Race: A Blueprint for American Primacy. ABC-CLIO, LLC. pp. 51–52. doi:10.5040/9798216183488.ch-003. ISBN 979-8-216-18348-8.
