= ArkEdge Space =

Japanese spaceflight company

- ArkEdge Space logo

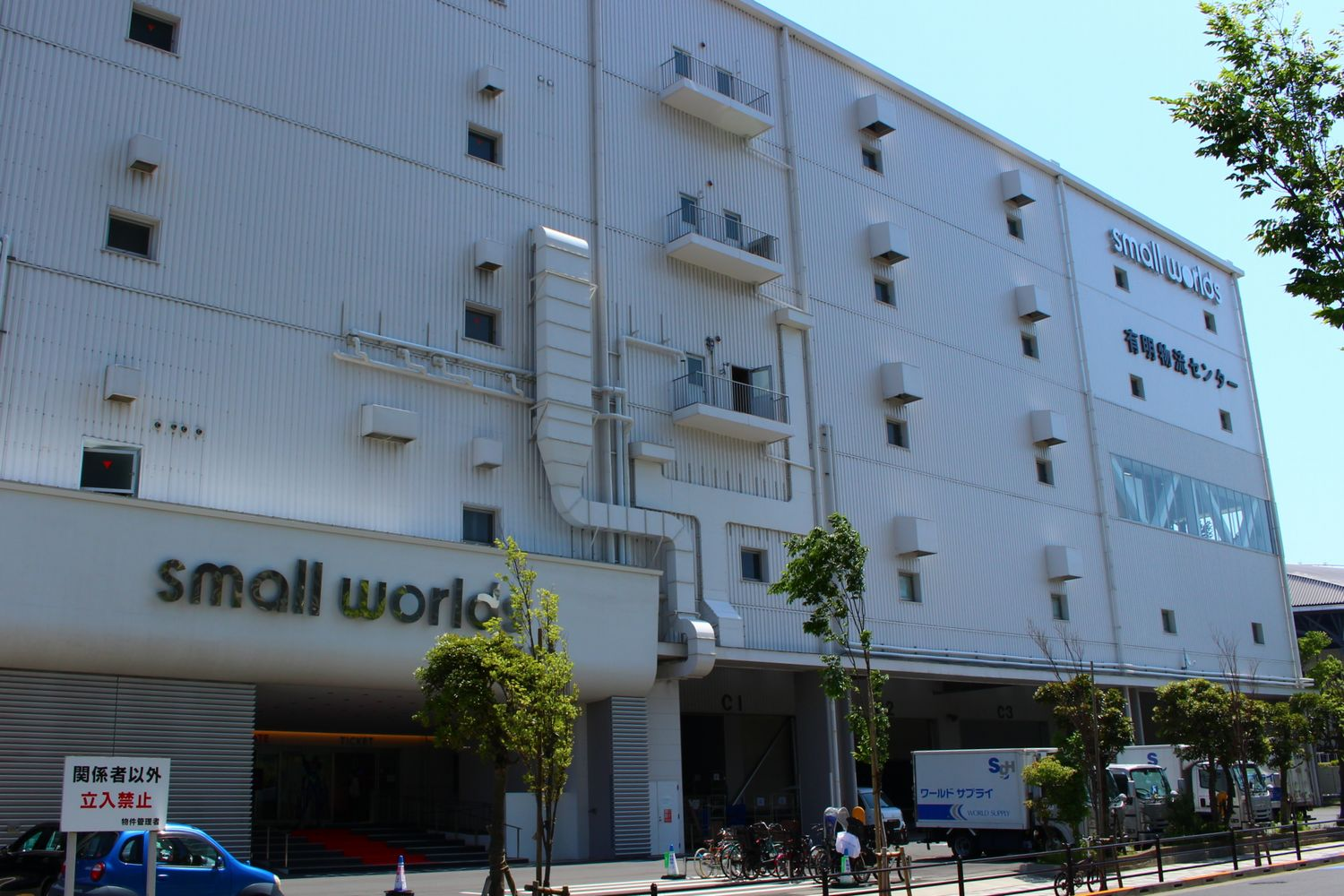
- Headquarters in Kōtō, Tokyo (Dome Ariake Headquarter)
- Formerly: Space Edge Lab
- Type: Private
- Industry: aerospace
- Founded: 2018
- Founder: Takayoshi Fukuyo
- Fate: Active
- Headquarters: Kōtō, Tokyo, Japan
- Products: nanosatellites
- Website: arkedgespace.com

ArkEdge Space is a spaceflight company focusing on the development and operation of small satellites. The company manufactures CubeSats and microsatellites for both government and private customers. ArkEdge Space plans to operate several satellite constellations, including one consisting of VHF Data Exchange System (VDES) satelllites.

The company has ties to the University of Tokyo Intelligent Space Systems Laboratory, which developed the XI-IV satellite. XI-IV was launched on 30 June 2003, becoming the world's first CubeSat to successfully function in orbit.

== History ==
The founder of ArkEdge Space, Takayoshi Fukuyo began his career in the field of international cooperation and forest surveys. As a student, Fukuyo studied the Amazon rainforest, and in 2004 he joined the Japan International Cooperation Agency (JICA), where he was dispatched to Brazil as a JICA expert, working on the planning of national parks. Fukyo used satellite remote sensing such as Landsat to track land usage, and recognized the difficulty in developing infrastructures at remote locations like deep inside a jungle, or in the middle of the sea. From 2009 Fukuyo worked for the Japanese Ministry of Foreign Affairs, and in 2017 he became an associate professor at the University of Tokyo Center for Spatial Information Science. It was during this time that he applied for the S-Booster 2017, a space-based business idea contest, with the idea 'Global Ripple Satellite Network'. This business idea won the special jury award, and became the basis of ArkEdge Space.

In July 2018, Fukuyo founded his own company, Space Edge Lab. The company's first satellite, RWASAT-1 was launched in 2019. The company changed its name to ArkEdge Space in January 2021. In March 2021 ArkEdge Space completed seed round funding, raising 400 million yen. In October 2021 the company announced plans to develop a VDES satellite and conduct on-orbit demonstration. In March 2022 the company closed Series A funding with a total of 2.3 billion yen raised. In February 2025 ArkEdge Space raised 8 billion yen in Series B round from investors including JIC Venture Growth Investments.

== Services ==
ArkEdge Space at 9th Bengaluru Space Expo 2026 BIEC

ArkEdge Space develops and operates smallsats of various size, ranging from 3U CubeSats to microsats heavier than 100 kg. For 6U CubeSats the company uses a standardized multi-purpose satellite bus that can be applied for a wide variety of missions including remote sensing, VDES communication, and optical communication. Spacecraft components developed in-house by ArkEdge Space include an Attitude Determination and Control Subsystem (ADCS) for CubeSats, and a satellite communication system with low energy consumption. The company also offers hosted payload services to its customers; for example the AE1c satellite launched in January 2025 carried and tested a water resistojet thruster developed by Pale Blue.

== Communication and location intelligence ==
ArkEdge Space is developing various satellites for communication and location intelligence, including establishing a constellation of IoT satellites and VDES satellites. In October 2024, the Japanese space agency JAXA selected ArkEdge to conduct a fesaibility study for the establishment of a Low Earth Orbit Positioning, Navigation and Timing (LEO-PNT) satellite constellation.

=== Optical communication satellites ===
ArkEdge Space is developing satellites for laser communication in space together with National Institute of Information and Communications Technology, Kiyohara Optics, and SoftBank Corp. The satellites will enable communication between low Earth orbit and high-altitude platform stations in the stratosphere using lasers. The AE4La satellite will be the first satellite of this series.

=== VDES satellite constellation ===
VHF Data Exchange System (VDES) is a next generation maritime communication standard based on Automatic Identification System (AIS), and is capable of bi-directional digital communication. While AIS is used to track maritime traffic, it has limitations in range and communication speed, along with only allowing communication in one direction. Thus an AIS satellite can only receive incoming AIS signals, and cannot send signals back to the ships. VDES works within a radius of 2,000 km (1,200 mi), and is designed to transmit a volume of information 32 times larger compared to AIS. Global satellite coverage can be achieved by a constellation of around 60 VDES satellites, and it will be possible to communicate around the world in real time using VDES. VDES can be used to monitor the position and velocity of ships to promptly respond to ships in distress and ship groundings, and broadcast maritime safety information such as ice charts and sea states to ships thousands of kilometers away from the shore. VDES also has a dedicated mode for ranging called VHF Data Exchange System Ranging (VDES-R). VDES-R will enable positioning for maritime traffic independent of global navigation satellite system (GNSS).

ArkEdge Space was one of the founding members of the Satellite VDES Consortium formed in October 2022. In March 2023, a group consisting of ArkEdge Space, IHI Corporation, and LocationMind was selected by the New Energy and Industrial Technology Development Organization (NEDO) for the project 'Development and Demonstration Project of Maritime Situational Awareness Technology Based on a Constellation of VDES Satellites'. On 14 January 2025, ArkEdge Space's first VDES satellite, AE1d was launched. AE1d is a 6U CubeSat with a deployable large antenna. A second VDES satellite, AE3Va was launched on 23 June 2025.

ArkEdge is also developing a heavier 30 kg class VDES and maritime observation nanosatellite.

== Deep space missions ==
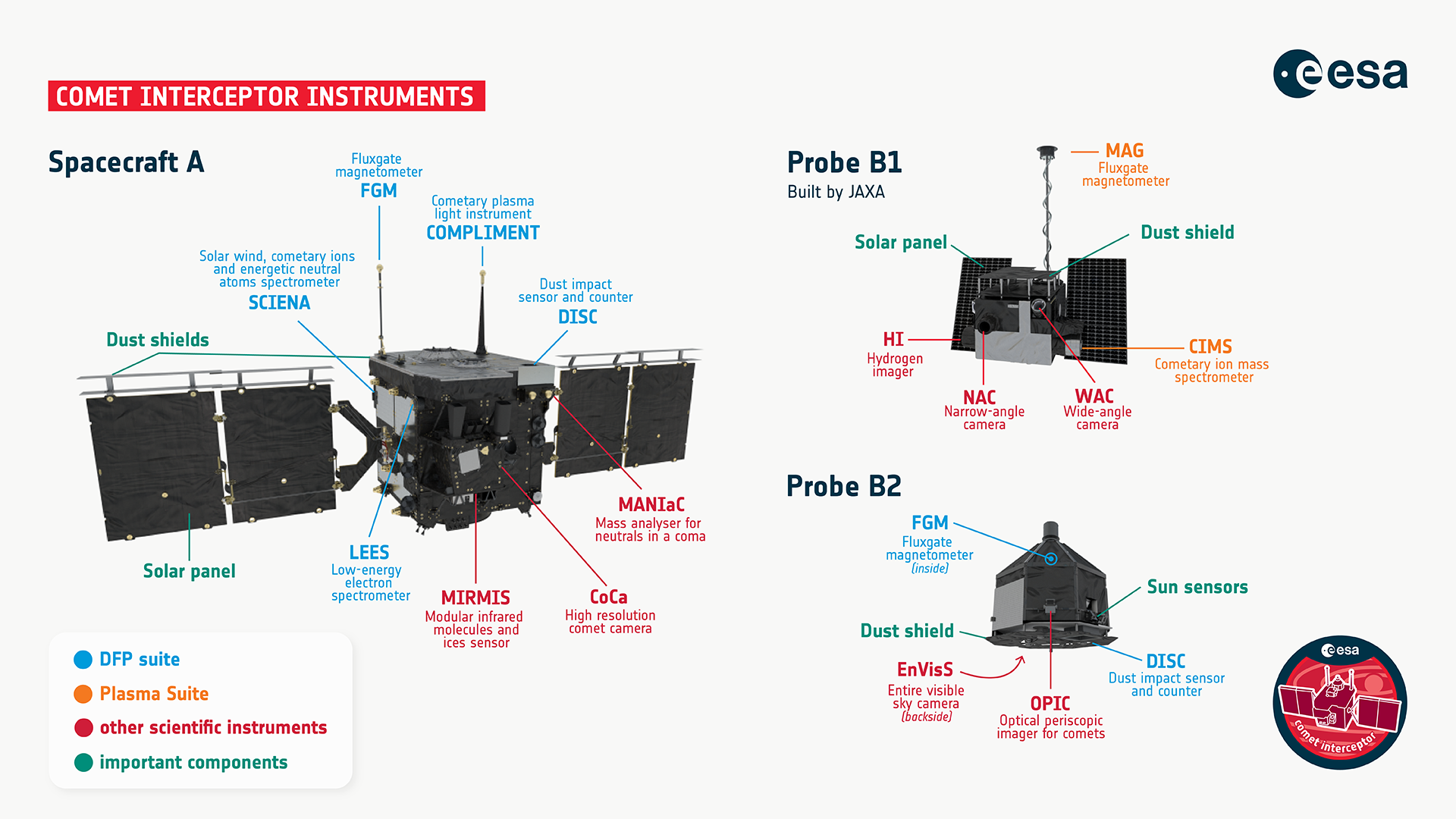
Schematic showing the instruments carried on Comet Interceptor. Probe B1 is on the upper right.

In December 2022, JAXA awarded a contract to ArkEdge Space for developing one of the probes that will flyby a comet as part of the Comet Interceptor mission. The Probe B1 spacecraft being built by ArkEdge Space is equipped with three scientific instruments, and will remain attached to its parent spacecraft until just before approaching a comet. The Comet Interceptor mission is planned to be launched in 2029.

== Remote sensing ==
ArkEdge Space is developing CubeSats for remote sensing. The AE2a satellite launched on 23 June 2025 is the company's first remote sensing satellite, and has a hyperspectral camera. AE2a conducted observation of vegetation and surface conditions.

== Spacecraft list ==
Spacecraft List
Spacecraft Name	COSPAR-ID	Launch Date (Deployment Date)	Launch Vehicle	Site	Spacecraft Size	Deorbit Date
RWASAT-1	1998-067QT	24 September 2019 (20 November 2019)	H-IIB	Tanegashima	3U	27 April 2022
OPTIMAL-1	1998-067VA	26 November 2022 (6 January 2023)	Falcon 9 Block 5	Kennedy	3U	22 August 2023
AE1b; YODAKA	1998-067XB	5 November 2024 (9 December 2024)	Falcon 9 Block 5	Kennedy	6U	28 February 2025
DENDEN-01	1998-067XD	5 November 2024 (9 December 2024)	Falcon 9 Block 5	Kennedy	1U	11 March 2025
AE1c	2025-009AS	14 January 2025	Falcon 9 Block 5	Vandenberg	6U	
AE1d	2025-009K	14 January 2025	Falcon 9 Block 5	Vandenberg	6U	
AE2a	2025-135BR	23 June 2025	Falcon 9 Block 5	Vandenberg	6U	
AE3Va	2025-135AM	23 June 2025	Falcon 9 Block 5	Vandenberg	6U	
AE5Ra	2025-276V	28 November 2025	Falcon 9 Block 5	Vandenberg	6U	
AE5Rb	2025-276AD	28 November 2025	Falcon 9 Block 5	Vandenberg	6U	
AE5Rc	2025-276M	28 November 2025	Falcon 9 Block 5	Vandenberg	6U	
AETS-1		5 March 2026	KAIROS	Kii	3U	Launch failure
AE1a	2026-067BZ	30 March 2026	Falcon 9 Block 5	Vandenberg	6U	
AE4La		1 October 2026	Falcon 9 Block 5	Vandenberg	6U	
Comet Interceptor Probe B1		2029	Ariane 62	Kourou	Nanosatellite	

== See also ==
- AAC Clyde Space
- Argotec
- GomSpace
- HawkEye 360
- Innovative Solutions In Space
- Kepler Communications
- NanoAvionics
- Orbcomm (satellite)
- Pixxel
- Spire Global
- Tyvak
