= Malligyong-1 =

North Korean spy satellite

- Malligyong-1 reconnaissance satellite, as depicted in an official North Korean illustration.
- Mission type: Reconnaissance
- Operator: NATA
- COSPAR ID: 2023-179A
- SATCAT no.: 58400

Spacecraft properties
- Dry mass: 300 kg (660 lb)
- Dimensions: Length: 1.3 m (4 ft 3 in)

Start of mission
- Launch date: 21 November 2023, 13:42 UTC
- Rocket: Chollima-1
- Launch site: Sohae

Orbital parameters
- Reference system: Sun-synchronous orbit
- Regime: Low Earth
- Perigee altitude: 497 kilometres (309 mi)*
- Apogee altitude: 508 kilometres (316 mi)*
- Inclination: 97.4 degrees
- Period: 94 minutes, 40 seconds

Images of the Malligyong-1
- Image of the satellite
- The satellite during Kim Jong Un inspection
- Malligyong-1's mission patch painted in the launch vehicle

Malligyong-1 (Note: Also transcribed as Manligyeong-1.) (Korean: 《만리경-1》호; lit. 'Telescope-1') is a type of North Korean reconnaissance satellite. Designed for imaging surveillance capability of several countries, Malligyong-1 has been launched three times onboard Chollima-1 launch vehicle, the last of which, occurred on 21 November 2023, was successful.

== Description ==
Malligyong-1 is North Korea's first spy satellite. It is in a sun-synchronous orbit at about 500 kilometres (310 mi) altitude, and will provide a global optical imaging surveillance capability of several countries. Malligyong-1 is estimated to be 1.3 m (4 ft 3 in) long and have a mass of about 300 kg (660 lb).

The resolution of the imaging capability is not generally known, although a maximum resolution of 1 m (3 ft 3 in) is suggested. According to Daily NK, it is lower than the resolution of Google's satellite imagery. They also states that the satellite uses a Japanese camera, alleged to be not capable of providing meaningful military surveillance data. South Korean news outlet The Dong-A Ilbo also reveals that Malligyong-1 has South Korean components, with North Korea possibly acquiring South Korean electronic devices in a third country or smuggled them from China.

== History ==
=== Reconnaissance satellite plans and component tests ===
At the 8th Congress of the Workers' Party of Korea held in January 2021, North Korean leader Kim Jong Un stated that the design process of a military reconnaissance satellite had been completed. During 2022, North Korea tested reconnaissance satellite components on 27 February, 5 March and 18 December. While the first two tests were conducted using medium-range ballistic missile-class or Hwasong-17-based vehicles, the December 2022 test used a Hwasong-7-based launcher.

According to North Korean state media, on 18 April 2023, Kim Jong Un visited National Aerospace Development Administration and ordered the launch of Malligyong-1, then known as "the military reconnaissance satellite No. 1". A month later, on 16 May 2023, Kim Jong Un and his daughter inspected the satellite.

=== First attempt ===
Malligyong-1 was initially planned to be launched in June 2023. In late-May 2023, North Korea announced to Japan and International Maritime Organization about an orbital launch that might occur between 31 May and 11 June 2023.

The first launch attempt occurred on 31 May 2023. The second stage of the launch vehicle, Chollima-1, ignited too early into the mission, causing the mission to fail. Evacuation alerts were issued in Okinawa Prefecture and were also erroneously issued in Seoul. The North Korean government quickly announced the launch failure.

The remains crashed into the Yellow Sea and South Korea attempted to salvage the remainder of the rocket, searching a site 200 kilometres (120 mi) off the coast of Eocheongdo. The South Korean Ministry of Defence released an image of a white cylinder, suspected to be a part of the rocket.

North Korea's National Aerospace Technology Administration (NATA) said it would investigate before conducting a second satellite launch. The White House, Japan, and the UN Secretary-General condemned the launch, citing violations of Security Council resolutions prohibiting the use of ballistic missile technology.

=== Second attempt ===
After the failure of first attempt, North Korea stated that it would try to relaunch Malligyong-1. On 22 August 2023, North Korea announced Japan that it would launch a satellite between 24 and 31 August. A second launch attempt of the satellite took place on 23 August 2023, again onboard a Chollima-1 launch vehicle. The launch resulted again in a failure with the loss of the satellite, this time caused by an error in the emergency flight termination system during the third-stage flight.

=== Third attempt ===
A third launch attempt was initially scheduled to take place in October 2023; however, it was delayed to November because of technological problems in the launch vehicle's third stage that needed Russian assistance to fix them. On 20 November 2023, North Korea announced Japan about a satellite launch that might take place between 22 November and 1 December.

The launch took place on 21 November 2023. The South Korean news agency Yonhap quoted its counterpart in the North, the Korean Central News Agency, as saying the satellite had been successfully inserted in the predetermined orbit, resulting in the first successful flight of the Chollima-1 launch vehicle. However, no immediate independent observations could be made. The probe has been confirmed to be in orbit, however, its status is not known.

According to NATA, Kim Jong Un oversaw the launch.

==== Status ====
North Korean state media reported that between 25 and 28 November 2023, Malligyong-1 captured a large number of photographs, including an image of the USS Carl Vinson anchoring at a military port in Busan, South Korea, as well as images of the White House, The Pentagon, United States army bases in South Korea and Guam and photos showing five United States and British aircraft carriers docked near Naval Station Norfolk and Newport News Shipbuilding.

On 2 December 2023, the reconnaissance satellite operation office of General Satellite Control Center, which is responsible for activities of Malligyong-1, became operational.

On 27 February 2024, South Korean Defense Minister, Shin Won-sik stated that there were no signs of Malligyong-1 being operational. He also noted the possibility of a satellite launch by North Korea in March 2024.

According to Dutch astronomer Marco Langbroek, between 19 and 24 February 2024, Malligyong-1 had made orbital raising maneuvers to prolong time in orbit and to circularize its orbit, this has demonstrated that the satellite has on-board propulsion and is communicating with ground communication stations in North Korea. Commands for orbit raising maneuvers were transmitted from North Korea. Further orbital raising maneuvers were made from 3–7 June 2024, 6–10 September 2024 and 16–18 January 2025.

=== Fourth attempt ===
On 27 May 2024, it was announced that North Korea had told Japan about a satellite launch, planned to take place within a launch window from 27 May to 4 June.

A fourth launch attempt of a new satellite, called Malligyong-1-1 (《만리경-1-1》호; lit. 'Telescope-1-1'), took place on 27 May 2024, onboard an unnamed new launch vehicle using liquid-oxygen and petroleum propellants. The launch resulted again in a failure with the loss of the satellite. This designation may indicate an improved version of the original Malligyong-1 satellite.

== See also ==
- 425 Project
