= Chollima-1 =

North Korean launch vehicle

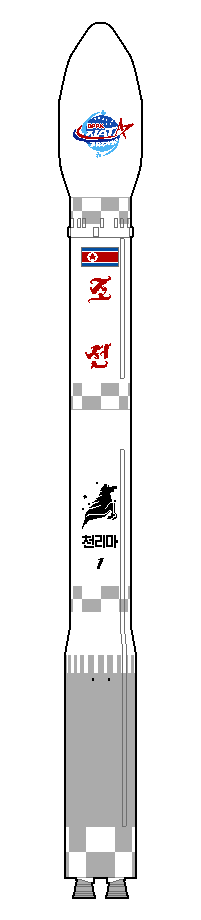
- Artist rendition
- Function: Expendable carrier rocket
- Manufacturer: National Aerospace Technology Administration
- Country of origin: North Korea

Size
- Height: 36.2–40 m (119–131 ft)
- Diameter: 2.4–2.6 m (7 ft 10 in – 8 ft 6 in)
- Stages: 3

Associated rockets
- Family: Chŏllima
- Comparable: R-36-O; Tsyklon-2; Tsyklon-3; Unha-2; Unha-3

Launch history
- Status: Active
- Launch sites: Sohae Satellite Launching Station, Coastal launch pad
- Total launches: 3
- Success(es): 1
- Failure: 2
- First flight: 30 May 2023
- Last flight: 21 November 2023
- Carries passengers or cargo: Malligyong

First stage
- Diameter: 2.6 m (8 ft 6 in) (assumed)
- Powered by: Hwasong-17-based engine
- Maximum thrust: 1,600 kN (160 tf)
- Propellant: UDMH/N_{2}O_{4} and RFNA

Second stage
- Diameter: 2.5 m (8 ft 2 in)
- Powered by: 1 × Unnamed engine with single combustion chamber
- Maximum thrust: 390 kN (40 tf) (guesswork)
- Propellant: Liquid fuel

Third stage
- Diameter: 2.1 m (6 ft 11 in) (estimated)
- Powered by: 2 × Unnamed small engine
- Maximum thrust: 29 kN (3.0 tf)
- Propellant: Liquid fuel

Chollima-1 (Note: Also transcribed Cheonlima-1.) (Note: Chollima-1 is named after Chollima, a Korean mythological horse and Chollima Movement, a North Korean Stakhanovite movement.) (Korean: 《천리마-1》형) is a North Korean launch vehicle. It has been used by North Korea to launch a satellite into orbit. The rocket is launched from a coastal launch platform in the Sohae Satellite Launching Station. The rocket has been developed to compete with the South Korean Nuri rocket.

== Description ==
Chollima-1 is a three-stage rocket. This new rocket, based on images released by North Korea, appears to be a different launcher from those of the previous Unha family. It appears to be abandoning the Scud heritage and take a design based on the Hwasong-15 and 17 ICBMs with advanced rocket engines based on the suspiciously acquired Soviet RD-250. According to 38 North, the Chollima-1's first stage is based on the Hwasong-17. Although the capabilities of the launch vehicle are not public, Chollima-1 appears to be a medium-lift launch vehicle for launching small satellites into low Earth orbit, and the payload mass for its maiden flight was estimated to be around 200 kilograms (440 lb) to 300 kilograms (660 lb).

Similarly, analysts believe that if North Korea still manages to supply itself with foreign components despite the sanctions, it manages to increasingly master local construction, becoming autonomous.

== History ==
=== First orbital flight ===
On 30 May 2023, Chollima-1 made its first orbital launch attempt, from Sohae Satellite Launching Station, carrying the military reconnaissance satellite Malligyong-1. However, the launch failed to achieve orbit when the second stage ignited too early in the mission, due to engine unreliability and fuel instability according to officials. The launch vehicle crashed into the Yellow Sea.

The South Korean Ministry of National Defense identified and recovered an object that appears to be a rocket stage or an interstage in the sea about 200 kilometres (120 mi) west of Eocheong Island. This debris, identified as being the second stage of the launcher, nevertheless sank, complicating its recovery. Other recovery operations followed for 36 days and made it possible to find the third stage of the launcher as well as the Malligyong-1 satellite, which were thus analyzed jointly with the United States, both to verify the origin of its components (and identify supply subsidiaries and foreign suppliers) and to assess the performance of the satellite, which was considered to be very low for military use.

Although North Korea hardly ever communicates in advance about its missile tests, it does when it wants to launch satellites, to present itself as respectful space power. The country had therefore warned Japan but not South Korea that it would carry out a space launch between 31 May and 11 June after having mentioned the finalization of the satellite a few weeks earlier.

However, despite the fears publicly expressed by these two countries of a possible disguised missile launch, South Korean maritime patrols were quickly set up in the fallout zones of the rocket stages, which allowed them to quickly recover debris.

Missile alerts (sirens and SMS) were mistakenly triggered in Seoul and Okinawa Prefecture.

=== Second orbital flight ===
On 22 August 2023, North Korea announced to Japan about the second attempt to launch a new copy of Malligyong-1, which was scheduled between 24 and 31 August. The second launch attempt took place on 23 August 2023. The launch resulted again in a failure with the loss of the satellite, this time caused by an error in the emergency blasting system during the third-stage flight.

=== Third orbital flight ===
North Korea announced a new attempt for October 2023. However, due to undisclosed technical delays the launch was later rescheduled for late November. The third launch attempt took place on 21 November 2023 and resulted in the first successful launch of Chollima-1.

== Launch history ==
| Satellite | Launch Date (UTC) | Launch Site | Status | Purpose |
|---|---|---|---|---|
| Malligyong-1 #1 | 30 May 2023 | Sohae Satellite Launching Station | Launch failure | Military reconnaissance satellite |
| Malligyong-1 #2 | 23 August 2023 | Sohae Satellite Launching Station | Launch failure | Military reconnaissance satellite |
| Malligyong-1 #3 | 21 November 2023 | Sohae Satellite Launching Station | Success | Military reconnaissance satellite |
