= 425 Project =

South Korean Reconnaissance satellite Program

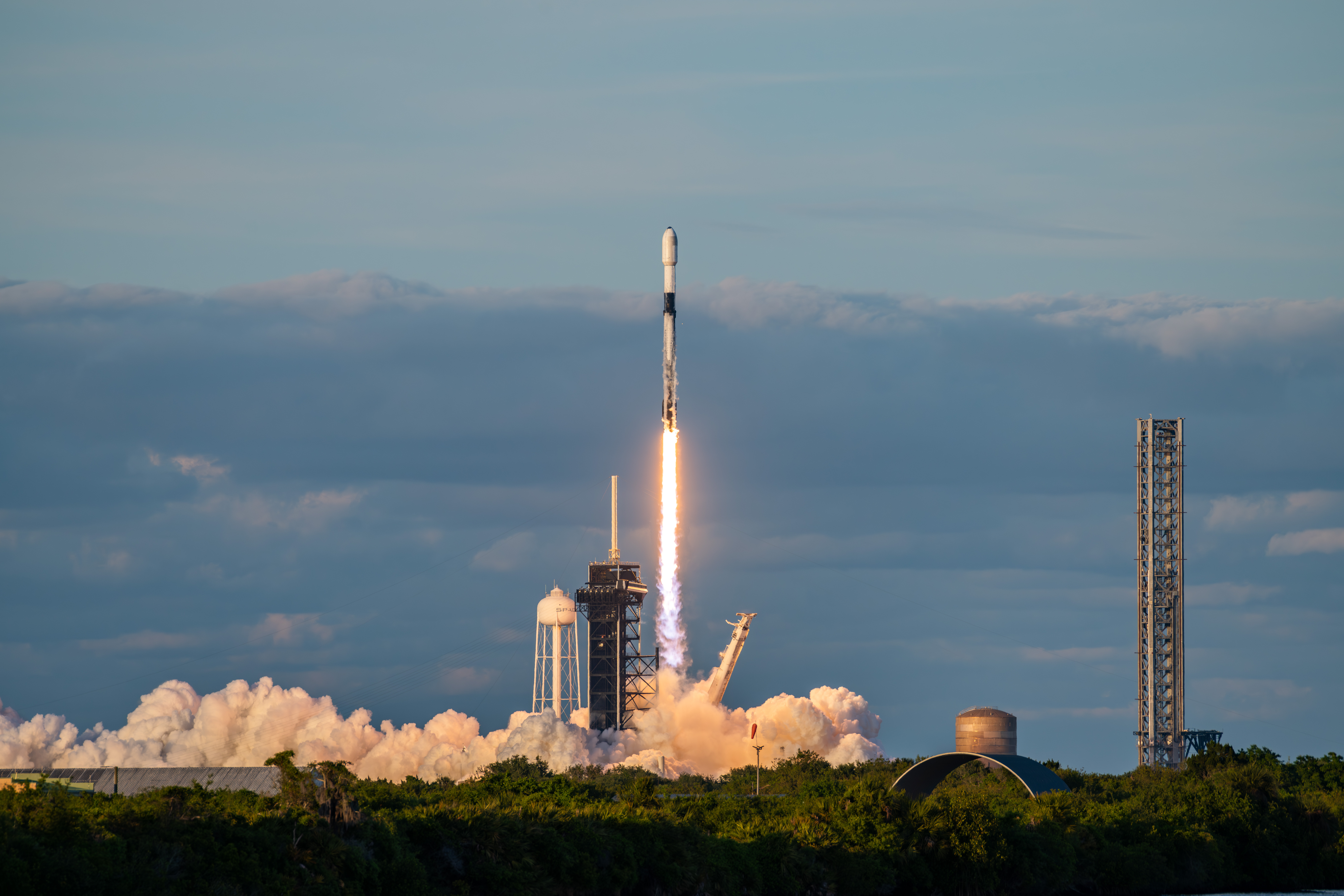
Falcon 9 rocket carrying the first SAR Satellite of the 425 Project on the SpaceX Bandwagon-1 Mission

The 425 Project is a South Korean military space program aimed at developing and deploying a constellation of five reconnaissance satellites to enhance the country's independent military satellite capabilities. The project focuses on monitoring North Korea's nuclear and ballistic missile activities in near-real time and reducing reliance on foreign intelligence assets. The project is managed by the Defense Acquisition Program Administration (DAPA).

Two varieties of satellites were planned and launched as part of the 425 project; the first satellite (KORSAT-7) contains electro-optical and infrared sensing images. The other four satellites (designated KORSAT-1 through -4) include a Synthetic-Aperture Radar (SAR) for remote sensing. Each SAR satellite features a 5-meter antenna folded into 24 'petals'.

== Development ==
The 425 Project was launched in 2014 in order to conduct surveillance of North Korea. Its name was produced by combining the Korean phonetics for "SAR" and "EO", representing the synthetic-aperture radar and electro-optical capabilities of the different satellites. Project costs were estimated at ₩1.2 trillion over the development period.

Further development was spurred and the 425 Project was made public in response to North Korean leader Kim Jong Un's remarks at the Eighth Congress of the Workers’ Party of Korea in 2021, where Kim announced the development of a military reconnaisance satellite; Malligyong-1, North Korea's first satellite, was successfully launched in November 2023.

The Electro-Optical satellite was developed by the Korea Aerospace Research Institute (responsible for functions relating to reconnaisance and communication), the Agency for Defense Development (responsible for the infrared equipment), and the National Security Research Institute (responsible for security). The four Synthetic-Aperture Radar satellites were constructed by European contractor Thales Alenia Space in conjunction with the same Korean domestic agencies.

The South Korean military performed a successful solid-fuel launch test in December 2022. One month after the launch of Malligyong-1, on 1 December 2023, the first 425 Project satellite was launched from Vandenberg Space Force Base in California, United States, with the remaining 4 being launched over the next two years.

== Satellites ==
Every 425 Project satellite has a KORSAT designation. Each satellite was launched aboard a SpaceX Falcon 9 rocket as part of the SpaceX Bandwagon rideshare program.

| Name | COSPAR-ID | Launch date (UTC) | Launch vehicle | Launch site | Perigee | Apogee | Inclination | Period (min) | Status |
|---|---|---|---|---|---|---|---|---|---|
| 425 Project EO/IR Sat-1 (KORSAT-7) | 2023-185B | 1 December 2023 | Falcon 9 Block 5 | Vandenberg Space Force Base | 547 km | 581 km | 97.6° | 95.9 | Operational |
| 425 Project SAR Sat-1 (KORSAT-1) | 2024-066L | 7 April 2024 | Falcon 9 Block 5 | Cape Canaveral Space Force Station | 567 km | 574 km | 45.4° | 96.1 | Operational |
| 425 Project SAR Sat-2 (KORSAT-2) | 2024-247A | 21 December 2024 | Falcon 9 Block 5 | Vandenberg Space Force Base | 569 km | 572 km | 45.4° | 96.1 | Operational |
| 425 Project SAR Sat-3 (KORSAT-3) | 2025-081A | 22 April 2025 | Falcon 9 Block 5 | Cape Canaveral Space Force Station | 553 km | 583 km | 45.4° | 96.1 | Operational |
| 425 Project SAR Sat-4 (KORSAT-4) | 2025-248A | 2 November 2025 | Falcon 9 Block 5 | Cape Canaveral Space Force Station | 570 km | 571 km | 45.4° | 96.1 | Operational |
