= Kepler Communications =

Canadian company

Kepler Communications, Inc.
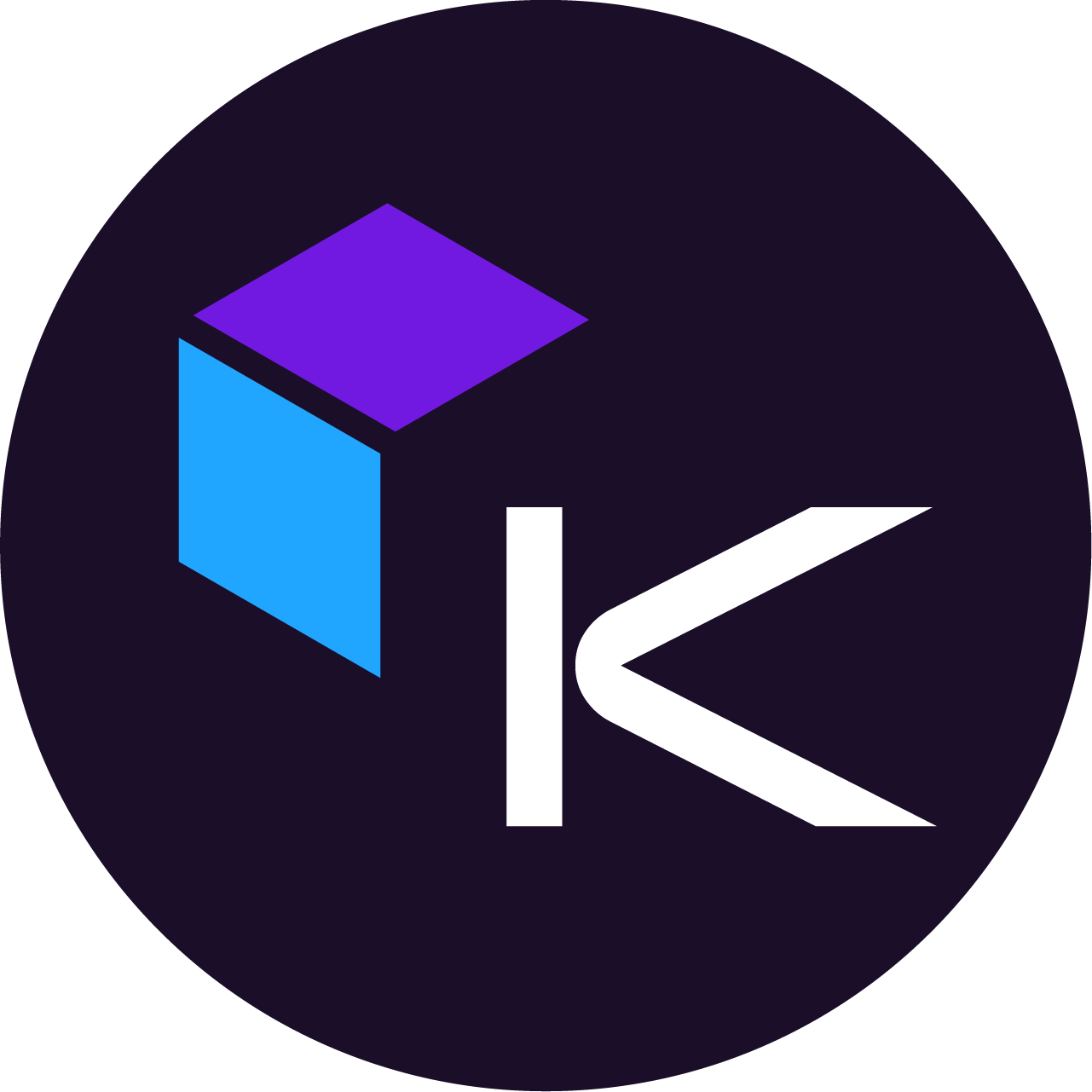
- Type: Private
- Industry: Telecommunications
- Founded: 2015
- Founders: Mina Mitry, Wen Cheng Chong, Mark Michael, Jeffrey Osborne
- Headquarters: Toronto, Ontario, Canada
- Website: kepler.space

Kepler Communications Inc. is an international satellite telecommunications company based in Toronto, Ontario, Canada, with presence in the UK and the USA. The company's stated mission is to create the internet for space and allow-in-space communications for the future space economy. It has also worked on building a satellite network for IoT communication systems.

== Overview ==
Kepler Communications was founded in 2015 by four graduate students from the University of Toronto, who previously worked together on various design projects through the University of Toronto Aerospace Team. The startup was incubated at University of Toronto's Entrepreneurship Hatchery, the Creative Destruction Lab, Ryerson University's (now Toronto Metropolitan University) DMZ, and was part of the Techstars Seattle 2016 cohort.The company is named in honour of Johannes Kepler, a pioneer in the discovery of the way in which objects in space interact. He is best known for his Laws of Planetary Motion.

Kepler was able to raise $5M in a seed round financing at Techstars, and in the span of 12 months was able to take KIPP from design to orbit. In 2018, the company successfully completed their Series A financing round, raising a total of $16M USD. The round was led by Costanoa Ventures, with participation by Deutsche Bahn's (DB) Digital Ventures as a strategic investor.It was followed by Series B funding, in which the company raised around US$60M, led by Tribe Capital in 2021. In April 2023, Kepler announced a successful Series C funding round of US$92 million, bringing its total amount of equity raised to over US$200 million. The round is led by IA Ventures and also backed by Costanoa Ventures, Canaan Partners, Tribe Capital, BDC Capital's Industrial Innovation Venture Fund, and others.

The company started as a builder of a shoebox-sized satellites constellation based on the CubeSat standard to deliver connectivity to other satellites and ground-based stations, allowing for near real-time exchange of data from IoT devices, large scale data backhaul (store-and-forward) services, and ultimately command and control for other space-based assets.

With its Series B funding round, the company started establishing its presence in the United States of America in 2018. Kepler Communication shifted its focus from IoT to optical constellation technology in 2020 and began to provide Internet connectivity for space-generated data and communications for in-space assets. Since its switch to integrated optical technology, the company has been using its Gen-2 satellites, which are bigger than previous CubeSat standards and weigh over 100 kilograms.

Kepler uses optical as its key technology for building space communication networks. Its test satellites, KIPP, CASE, and TARS, were constructed by Glasgow-based AAC. Kepler then started to develop its operational satellites in-house. In 2022, the company signed a contract with Germany's Tesat-Spacecom to build an in-space communication network with its laser communication terminals. In addition, Kepler Communications began its partnership with Houston-based AXIOM Space and Broomfield-based Skyloom Global to initiate Optical Inter-Satellite Links (OISLs) in the following year.

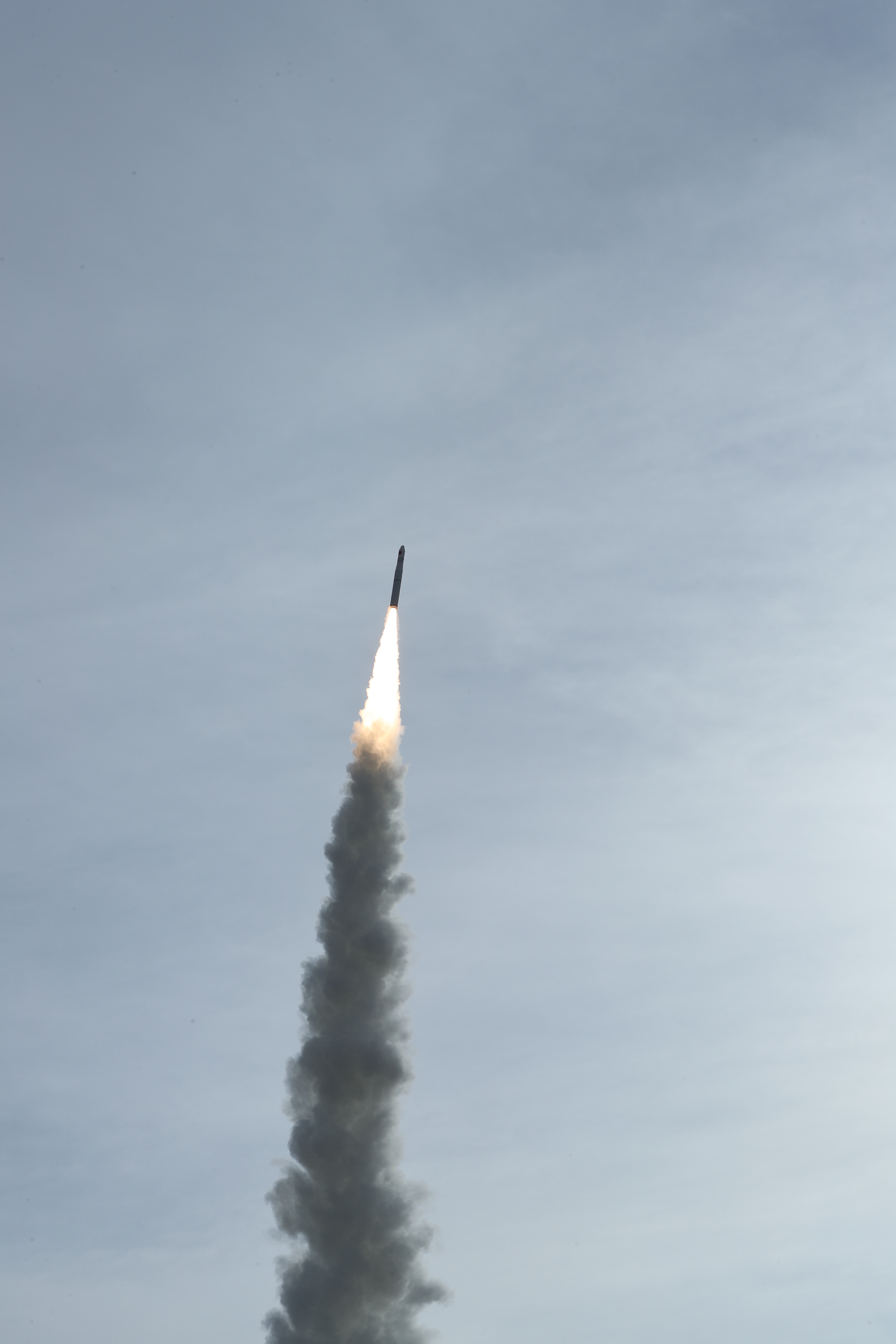
The launch of Kepler's first satellite, KIPP, in January 2018.

== Satellites constellations ==
=== Kepler ===
Bearing the same name as the company, the Kepler constellation is a constellation of cubesats for Internet of Things (IoT), machine-to-machine (M2M), and inter-satellite communications services. The first three cubesats, sent to orbit as technology demonstrators, were built in a 3U format. The first two of them (KIPP and CASE) were built by AAC Clyde Space and the third (TARS) by ÅAC Microtec. They are named after fictitious robots in the 2014 film “Interstellar.” KIPP and CASE, which travel at speeds in excess of 7 kilometers per second, have software installed to compensate for Doppler shift.

As of April, 2023, eighteen operational satellites have joined the constellation. They are based on the 6U-format Spartan cubesat platform and were developed by Kepler Communications in cooperation with UTIAS-SFL. Company officials have stated a goal of growing their constellation up to 140 units, all located in Sun-Synchronous polar orbits, approximately 575 km above the Earth's surface.

List of satellites
Name	COSPAR	Catalog N°	Launch date	Launch vehicle
Test satellites
Kepler 0 KIPP	2018-008D	43157	19 January 2018	Long March 11
Kepler 1 CASE	2018-096L	43729	29 November 2018	PSLV-CA
Kepler 2 TARS	2020-061AZ	46319	3 September 2020	Falcon 9 Block 5
Operational satellites
Kepler 4 Antilles	2020-068N	46499	28 September 2020	Falcon 9 Block 5
Kepler 5 Amidala	2020-068P	46498	28 September 2020	Falcon 9 Block 5
Kepler 6 Rocinante	2021-022Z	47955	22 March 2021	Soyuz-2.1a
Kepler 7 C3PO	2021-022T	47949	22 March 2021	Soyuz-2.1a
Kepler 8 Amarok	2021-006BR	47476	24 January 2021	Falcon 9 Block 5
Kepler 9 Artemis	2021-006DX	47531	24 January 2021	Falcon 9 Block 5
Kepler 10 Baby Yoda	2021-006CS	47501	24 January 2021	Falcon 9 Block 5
Kepler 11 Daneel	2021-006CU	47503	24 January 2021	Falcon 9 Block 5
Kepler 12 Boba	2021-006AK	47446	24 January 2021	Falcon 9 Block 5
Kepler 13 Lucky	2021-006AT	47454	24 January 2021	Falcon 9 Block 5
Kepler 14 Stella	2021-006DS	47526	24 January 2021	Falcon 9 Block 5
Kepler 15 Sudormrf	2021-006BA	47461	24 January 2021	Falcon 9 Block 5
Kepler 16 Astraeus	2022-002CB	51057	13 January 2022	Falcon 9 Block 5
Kepler 17 Karina	2022-002CD	51059	13 January 2022	Falcon 9 Block 5
Kepler 18 Blip-A	2022-002U	51002	13 January 2022	Falcon 9 Block 5
Kepler 19	2022-002BV	51051	13 January 2022	Falcon 9 Block 5
Kepler 20	2023-054AR	56217	15 April 2023	Falcon 9 Block 5
Kepler 21	2023-054AS	56218	15 April 2023	Falcon 9 Block 5

=== The Kepler Network ===
The Kepler Network, previously known as the Aether Network, is the company's optical constellation based on data relay Gen-2 satellites to provide in-space real-time connectivity for orbiting spacecraft moving past the need to rely on ground stations.

The first two satellites of the constellation launched on 11 November 2023 as part of SpaceX Transporter-9 rideshare mission. They will be able to provide data on-demand at up to 2.5 Gigabit-per-second for the end-user through a combination of optical, S band, and Ku band technologies. Access to the network will be granted to third-party satellites and other spacecraft equipped with Space Development Agency compatible optical terminals.

The next ten 300-kilogram optical satellites, featuring onboard compute, launched on 11 January 2026 on board a Falcon 9, offering 100-gigabit optical technology. Four of the satellites carry OroraTech's SAFIRE Gen4 thermal cameras for wildfire detection, achieving first light on 15 May 2026.

List of satellites
Name	COSPAR	Catalog N°	Launch date	Launch vehicle
Aether-1	2023-174AB	58281	11 November 2023	Falcon 9 Block 5
Aether-2	2023-174AV	58299	11 November 2023	Falcon 9 Block 5
Aether-3	2026-004M	67374	11 January 2026	Falcon 9 Block 5
Aether-4	2026-004N	67375	11 January 2026	Falcon 9 Block 5
Aether-5	2026-004P	67376	11 January 2026	Falcon 9 Block 5
Aether-6	2026-004Q	67377	11 January 2026	Falcon 9 Block 5
Aether-7	2026-004R	67378	11 January 2026	Falcon 9 Block 5
Aether-8	2026-004S	67379	11 January 2026	Falcon 9 Block 5
Aether-9	2026-004T	67380	11 January 2026	Falcon 9 Block 5
Aether-10	2026-004U	67381	11 January 2026	Falcon 9 Block 5
Aether-11	2026-004V	67382	11 January 2026	Falcon 9 Block 5
Aether-12	2026-004W	67383	11 January 2026	Falcon 9 Block 5
