= National Aerospace Technology Administration =

Space agency of North Korea

- 국가항공우주기술총국
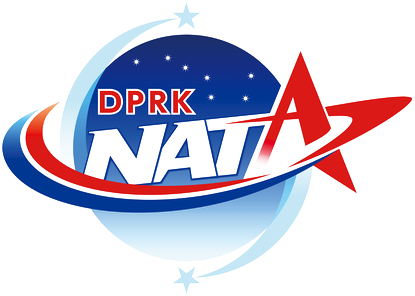
- NATA logo

Agency overview
- Abbreviation: NATA
- Formed: 1 April 2013; 13 years ago
- Preceding agency: KCST, NADA
- Type: Space agency
- Jurisdiction: Government of North Korea
- Headquarters: Pyongyang
- Administrator: Ryu Sang Hoon, Director
- Primary spaceport: Sohae Satellite Launching Station

- National Aerospace Technology Administration
- Chosŏn'gŭl: 국가항공우주기술총국
- Hancha: 國家航空宇宙技術總局
- Revised Romanization: Gukga Hanggong Uju Gisul Chongguk
- McCune–Reischauer: Kukka Hanggong Uju Kisul Ch'ongguk

National Aerospace Technology Administration (NATA; Korean: 국가항공우주기술총국) is the official space agency of North Korea, succeeding the Korean Committee of Space Technology (KCST). It was founded on 1 April 2013. Formerly called the National Aerospace Development Administration (NADA), it changed its name in September 2023 following the 9th Session of the 14th Supreme People's Assembly. The current basis for the activities of NATA is the Law on Space Development, passed in 2014 during the 7th session of the 12th Supreme People's Assembly.

== Korean Committee of Space Technology ==
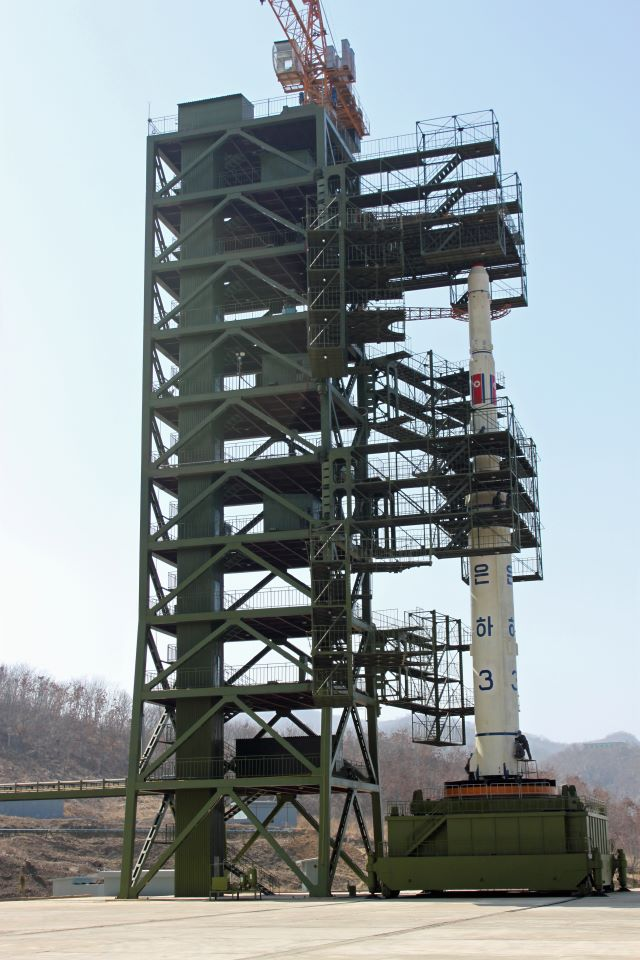
Unha-3 Rocket on 8 April 2012 in Sohae

In 1980, KCST, the executive space agency of North Korea, began research and development with the aim of producing and placing communications satellites, Earth observation satellites, and weather observation satellites into orbit.

== International agreements ==
In 2009, North Korea signed the Outer Space Treaty, and the Convention on Registration of Objects Launched into Outer Space.

In 2016, North Korea accepted the Rescue Agreement, an international agreement setting forth rights and obligations of states concerning the rescue of persons in space, as well as the Convention on International Liability for Damage Caused by Space Objects.

== Logos ==
NATA's previous emblem consisted of a dark blue globe with the word Kukgaujugaebalkuk (National Space Development Administration) in white Korean letters on the bottom, DPRK (Democratic People's Republic of Korea) in light blue letters on the top, the Big Dipper, NADA in white letters in the middle, and two bright blue rings symbolizing satellite orbits and the intention of place on all orbits of satellites. The logo was described as representing the agency's "character, mission, position, and development prospect". Ursa Major was intended to symbolize and glorify the Democratic People's Republic of Korea as a space power.

Western media pointed out that the logo bore a striking resemblance to NASA's logo — both have blue globes, white lettering, stars, and swooshed rings.

NATA's new logo includes an additional red stripe, similar to NASA's.

== List of former directors ==
- Yu Chol-u (2015?-2019?)
- Ryu Sang-hoon (2023?-)

== See also ==
- North Korean space program
- Korean Committee of Space Technology
- List of space agencies
- List of government space agencies
- Munitions Industry Department of the Workers' Party of Korea
