= List of spaceflight launches in January–June 2023 =

This article lists orbital and suborbital launches during the first half of the year 2023.

For all other spaceflight activities, see 2023 in spaceflight. For launches in the second half of 2023, see List of spaceflight launches in July–December 2023.

== Orbital launches ==
- ← Jan
- Feb
- Mar
- Apr
- May
- Jun
- Jul
- Aug
- Sep
- Oct
- Nov
- Dec →

Date and time (UTC)	Rocket	Flight number	Launch site		LSP	
Date and time (UTC)	Payload (⚀ = CubeSat)	Operator	Orbit	Function	Decay (UTC)	Outcome
Date and time (UTC)	Remarks					
=== January ===
3 January; 14:56:00	(United States) Falcon 9 Block 5	Transporter-6	(United States) Cape Canaveral SLC-40		(United States) SpaceX	
3 January; 14:56:00	(Italy) ION SCV-007 Glorious Gratia	D-Orbit	Low Earth (SSO)	CubeSat deployer	In orbit	Operational
3 January; 14:56:00	(Italy) ION SCV-008 Fierce Franciscus	D-Orbit	Low Earth (SSO)	CubeSat deployer	In orbit	Operational
3 January; 14:56:00	(United States) CHIMERA LEO-1	Epic Aerospace	Under Earth (SSO)	Space tug	In orbit	Operational
3 January; 14:56:00	(United States) Orbiter SN1	Launcher	Low Earth (SSO)	Space tug	In orbit	Spacecraft failure
3 January; 14:56:00	(United States) Vigoride-5 (VR-5)	Momentus Space	Low Earth (SSO)	Space tug	In orbit	Operational
3 January; 14:56:00	(Argentina) Albania-1 (ÑuSat 32)	Government of Albania / Satellogic	Low Earth (SSO)	Earth observation	In orbit	Operational
3 January; 14:56:00	(Argentina) Albania-2 (ÑuSat 33)	Government of Albania / Satellogic	Low Earth (SSO)	Earth observation	In orbit	Operational
3 January; 14:56:00	(United States) EOS SAT-1 (EOS Agrisat-1)	EOS Data Analytics	Low Earth (SSO)	Earth observation	In orbit	Operational
3 January; 14:56:00	(Finland) ICEYE × 3	ICEYE	Low Earth (SSO)	Earth observation	In orbit	2/3 Operational; 1/3 Deployment failure
3 January; 14:56:00	(United States) Lynk Tower 03	Lynk Global	Low Earth (SSO)	Communications	In orbit	Operational
3 January; 14:56:00	(United States) Lynk Tower 04	Lynk Global	Low Earth (SSO)	Communications	In orbit	Operational
3 January; 14:56:00	(Argentina) ÑuSat 34	Satellogic	Low Earth (SSO)	Earth observation	In orbit	Operational
3 January; 14:56:00	(Argentina) ÑuSat 35	Satellogic	Low Earth (SSO)	Earth observation	In orbit	Operational
3 January; 14:56:00	(Australia) Skykraft-1	Skykraft	Low Earth (SSO)	Satellite deployer	In orbit	Operational
3 January; 14:56:00	(Australia) Skykraft ATM × 4	Skykraft	Low Earth (SSO)	Air traffic management	In orbit	Operational
3 January; 14:56:00	(United States) Umbra-04	Umbra Space	Low Earth (SSO)	Earth observation	In orbit	Operational
3 January; 14:56:00	(United States) Umbra-05	Umbra Space	Low Earth (SSO)	Earth observation	In orbit	Operational
3 January; 14:56:00	(United States) YAM-5	Loft Orbital	Low Earth (SSO)	Payload hosting	In orbit	Operational
3 January; 14:56:00	⚀ (Switzerland) Astrocast × 4	Astrocast	Low Earth (SSO)	IoT	In orbit	Operational
3 January; 14:56:00	⚀ (Czech Republic) BDSAT-2	CEITEC	Low Earth (SSO)	Amateur radio	In orbit	Operational
3 January; 14:56:00	⚀ (France) BRO-8	UnseenLabs	Low Earth (SSO)	SIGINT	In orbit	Operational
3 January; 14:56:00	⚀ (Turkey) Connecta T1.2	Plan-S	Low Earth (SSO)	IoT	In orbit	Operational
3 January; 14:56:00	⚀ (United States) EWS RROCI	SSC / Orion Space Solutions	Low Earth (SSO)	Earth observation	3 January 2023	Deployment failure
3 January; 14:56:00	⚀ (Japan) EYE (Star-Sphere 1)	Sony	Low Earth (SSO)	Earth observation	In orbit	Partial failure
3 January; 14:56:00	⚀ (United States) Flock 4y × 36	Planet Labs	Low Earth (SSO)	Earth observation	In orbit	Operational
3 January; 14:56:00	⚀ (Italy) FUTURA-SM1	NPC Spacemind	Low Earth (SSO)	Technology demonstration	4 May 2023	Successful
3 January; 14:56:00	⚀ (Italy) FUTURA-SM3	NPC Spacemind	Low Earth (SSO)	Technology demonstration	19 April 2023	Successful
3 January; 14:56:00	⚀ (France) Gama Alpha	Gama	Low Earth (SSO)	Technology demonstration	In orbit	Operational
3 January; 14:56:00	⚀ (United Kingdom) Guardian-Alpha (Pushan-Alpha)	OrbAstro	Low Earth (SSO)	Technology demonstration	In orbit	Operational
3 January; 14:56:00	⚀ (Sweden) (United States) Kelpie 1	AAC Clyde Space / Orbcomm	Low Earth (SSO)	IoT / AIS	In orbit	Operational
3 January; 14:56:00	⚀ (Luxembourg) KSF3 × 4 (Observer Mission)	Kleos Space	Low Earth (SSO)	Navigation	In orbit	Operational
3 January; 14:56:00	⚀ (Kuwait) KuwaitSat-1	Kuwait University	Low Earth (SSO)	Technology demonstration	In orbit	Operational
3 January; 14:56:00	⚀ (United States) Lemur-2 × 6	Spire Global	Low Earth (SSO)	Earth observation	In orbit	Operational
3 January; 14:56:00	⚀ (United Kingdom) (Spain) Menut	Open Cosmos / Catalan Space Agency	Low Earth (SSO)	Earth observation	In orbit	Operational
3 January; 14:56:00	⚀ (Netherlands) (Norway) MilSpace-2 1 (Birkeland)	Royal NLR / TNO / FFI	Low Earth (SSO)	Technology demonstration	In orbit	Operational
3 January; 14:56:00	⚀ (Netherlands) (Norway) MilSpace-2 2 (Huygens)	Royal NLR / TNO / FFI	Low Earth (SSO)	Technology demonstration	In orbit	Operational
3 January; 14:56:00	⚀ (Israel) NSLSat-2	NSLComm	Low Earth (SSO)	Communications	In orbit	Operational
3 January; 14:56:00	⚀ (United States) PACE-2	NASA	Low Earth (SSO)	Technology demonstration	In orbit	Awaiting deployment
3 January; 14:56:00	⚀ (Bulgaria) Platform 2 (Shared Sat 2211)	EnduroSat	Low Earth (SSO)	Payload hosting	In orbit	Operational
3 January; 14:56:00	⚀ (Ukraine) PolyITAN-HP-30	Kyiv Polytechnic Institute	Low Earth (SSO)	Technology demonstration	In orbit	Operational
3 January; 14:56:00	⚀ (United States) PROVES – Yearling	Cal Poly Pomona	Low Earth (SSO)	Technology demonstration Education	In orbit	Transfer stage failure
3 January; 14:56:00	⚀ (United States) Sapling-1 (Sapling Sempervirens)	Stanford Student Space Initiative	Low Earth (SSO)	Technology demonstration Education	In orbit	Transfer stage failure
3 January; 14:56:00	⚀ (United Arab Emirates) (Turkey) Sharja-Sat-1	SAASST / ITU	Low Earth (SSO)	Technology demonstration	In orbit	Operational
3 January; 14:56:00	⚀ (United States) SpaceBEE × 12	Swarm Technologies	Low Earth (SSO)	Communications	In orbit	Operational
3 January; 14:56:00	⚀ (Poland) (Germany) STAR VIBE	Scanway / German Orbital Systems	Low Earth (SSO)	Earth observation	In orbit	Operational
3 January; 14:56:00	⚀ (Denmark) Sternula-1	Sternula	Low Earth (SSO)	AIS ship tracking	In orbit	Operational
3 January; 14:56:00	⚀ (Israel) TAUSAT2	Tel Aviv University	Low Earth (SSO)	Technology demonstration	In orbit	Operational
3 January; 14:56:00	⚀ (Singapore) Zeus-1	Qosmosys / Orient G	Low Earth (SSO)	Technology demonstration	In orbit	Operational
3 January; 14:56:00	⚀ (Italy) TBA	NPC Spacemind	Low Earth (SSO)	Technology demonstration	In orbit	Transfer stage failure
3 January; 14:56:00	⚀ (Argentina) MDQSAT-1A Juana Azurduy	Innova Space	Low Earth (SSO)	IoT	In orbit	Transfer stage failure
3 January; 14:56:00	⚀ (Argentina) MDQSAT-1B Simón Bolívar	Innova Space	Low Earth (SSO)	IoT	In orbit	Transfer stage failure
3 January; 14:56:00	▫ (United Kingdom) Unicorn-2G	Alba Orbital	Low Earth (SSO)	Earth observation	In orbit	Transfer stage failure
3 January; 14:56:00	▫ (United Kingdom) Unicorn-2H	Alba Orbital	Low Earth (SSO)	Earth observation	In orbit	Transfer stage failure
3 January; 14:56:00	Dedicated SmallSat Rideshare mission to Sun-synchronous orbit, designated Transporter-6. Vigoride-5 carries Caltech's Space Solar Power Project (SSPD-1) as a hosted payload. Orbiter SN1 carried TRL11's SAVER, Beyond Burials' Shooting Star Memorial and a payload from Logitech Mevo as hosted payloads. Orbiter SN1 failed shortly after deployment. The ION-SCV deployers carry Cryptosat's Crypto-2, IAC's DRAGO-2, Genergo's Genergo-2, and an undisclosed payload as hosted payloads. Albania-1 and Albania-2, the first Albanian satellites, were launched on this flight. EWS RROCI failed to deploy from the Falcon 9 second stage and reentered the atmosphere on the day of launch. This was not a SpaceX failure as brokered dispensers and deployers are used on Transporter missions.					
8 January; 22:00	(China) Long March 7A	7A-Y4	(China) Wenchang LC-2		(China) CASC	
8 January; 22:00	(China) Shijian 23	SAST	Geosynchronous	Technology demonstration	In orbit	Operational
9 January; 05:04	(China) Ceres-1	Y5	(China) Jiuquan LS-95A		(China) Galactic Energy	
9 January; 05:04	(China) Nantong Zhongxue	Nantong Secondary School	Low Earth (SSO)	Education	In orbit	Operational
9 January; 05:04	(China) Tianmu-1 01	Xiyong Microelectronics	Low Earth (SSO)	Meteorology	In orbit	Operational
9 January; 05:04	(China) Tianmu-1 02	Xiyong Microelectronics	Low Earth (SSO)	Meteorology	In orbit	Operational
9 January; 05:04	(China) Xiamen Keji-1	TBA	Low Earth (SSO)	Earth observation	In orbit	Operational
9 January; 05:04	⚀ (China) Tianqi-13	Guodian Gaoke	Low Earth (SSO)	IoT	In orbit	Operational
9 January; 05:04	Mission designated "Give Me Five".					
9 January; 23:08:49	(United States) LauncherOne	"Start Me Up"	(United Kingdom) Cosmic Girl, Cornwall		(United States) Virgin Orbit	
9 January; 23:08:49	⚀ (Oman) AMAN	ETCO	Low Earth	Earth observation	9 January	Launch failure
9 January; 23:08:49	⚀ (United Kingdom) (United States) CIRCE A, B	Dstl / NRL	Low Earth	Ionospheric research	9 January	Launch failure
9 January; 23:08:49	⚀ (United Kingdom) DOVER	RHEA Group	Low Earth	Technology demonstration	9 January	Launch failure
9 January; 23:08:49	⚀ (United Kingdom) ForgeStar-0	Space Forge	Low Earth	Technology demonstration	9 January	Launch failure
9 January; 23:08:49	⚀ (United Kingdom) IOD-3 Amber	Satellite Applications Catapult	Low Earth	Maritime domain awareness	9 January	Launch failure
9 January; 23:08:49	⚀ (United Kingdom) (United States) Prometheus 2A, 2B	UK Ministry of Defence / NRO	Low Earth	Technology demonstration	9 January	Launch failure
9 January; 23:08:49	⚀ (Poland) STORK-6	SatRevolution	Low Earth	Earth observation	9 January	Launch failure
9 January; 23:08:49	First LauncherOne flight from Spaceport Cornwall. Oman's first attempted satellite, AMAN, was lost.					
10 January; 04:50:17	(United States) Falcon 9 Block 5	F9-196	(United States) Cape Canaveral SLC-40		(United States) SpaceX	
10 January; 04:50:17	(United Kingdom) OneWeb × 40	OneWeb	Low Earth	Communications	In orbit	Operational
10 January; 04:50:17	OneWeb #16.					
10 January; 23:27:30	(United States) RS1	DEMO-1	(United States) Kodiak LP-3C		(United States) ABL	
10 January; 23:27:30	⚀ (United States) VariSat-1A, 1B	VariSat	Low Earth	Technology demonstration	10 January	Launch failure
10 January; 23:27:30	First flight of RS1, designated DEMO-1. Launch failed a little over 10 seconds after liftoff due to a loss of power that shut down the first stage engines.					
12 January; 18:10	(China) Long March 2C	2C-Y61	(China) Xichang LC-3		(China) CASC	
12 January; 18:10	(China) Apstar 6E	APT Satellite Holdings	Geosynchronous	Communications	In orbit	Operational
13 January; 07:00	(China) Long March 2D	2D-Y73	(China) Jiuquan SLS-2		(China) CASC	
13 January; 07:00	(China) Yaogan 37	CAS	Low Earth	Reconnaissance	In orbit	Operational
13 January; 07:00	(China) Shiyan 22A	SAST	Low Earth	Technology demonstration	In orbit	Operational
13 January; 07:00	(China) Shiyan 22B	SAST	Low Earth	Technology demonstration	In orbit	Operational
15 January; 03:14	(China) Long March 2D	2D-Y71	(China) Taiyuan LC-9		(China) CASC	
15 January; 03:14	(China) Beiyou-1 (BUPT-1)	BUPT	Low Earth (SSO)	Technology demonstration	In orbit	Operational
15 January; 03:14	(China) Jilin-1 Gaofen-03D 34	Chang Guang Satellite Technology	Low Earth (SSO)	Earth observation	In orbit	Operational
15 January; 03:14	(China) Jilin-1 Hongwai-01A 07–08	Chang Guang Satellite Technology	Low Earth (SSO)	Earth observation	In orbit	Operational
15 January; 03:14	(China) Jilin-1 Mofang-02A 03–04, 07	Chang Guang Satellite Technology	Low Earth (SSO)	Earth observation	In orbit	Operational
15 January; 03:14	(China) Luojia-3 01 (Yantai-1)	Wuhan University / DFH Satellite Co.	Low Earth (SSO)	Earth observation	In orbit	Operational
15 January; 03:14	(China) Qilu-2	SDIIT	Low Earth (SSO)	Earth observation	In orbit	Operational
15 January; 03:14	(China) Qilu-3	SDIIT	Low Earth (SSO)	Earth observation	In orbit	Operational
15 January; 03:14	(China) Rizhao-3 (Tianzhi-2D)	CAS	Low Earth (SSO)	Technology demonstration	In orbit	Operational
15 January; 03:14	⚀ (China) Golden Bauhinia 03–04, 06	Hong Kong Aerospace Science & Technology	Low Earth (SSO)	Earth observation	In orbit	Operational
15 January; 03:14	Long March Express 3 rideshare mission.					
15 January; 22:56	(United States) Falcon Heavy	FH-005	(United States) Kennedy LC-39A		(United States) SpaceX	
15 January; 22:56	(United States) CBAS-2 (USA-342)	United States Space Force	Geosynchronous	Military communications	In orbit	Operational
15 January; 22:56	(United States) LDPE-3A (ROOSTER-3A)	United States Space Force	Geosynchronous	Technology demonstration	In orbit	Operational
15 January; 22:56	USSF-67 mission.					
18 January; 12:24	(United States) Falcon 9 Block 5	F9-197	(United States) Cape Canaveral SLC-40		(United States) SpaceX	
18 January; 12:24	(United States) GPS III-06 Amelia Earhart (USA-343)	United States Space Force	Medium Earth	Navigation	In orbit	Operational
18 January; 12:24	Named after American aviation pioneer Amelia Earhart.					
19 January; 15:43:10	(United States) Falcon 9 Block 5	Starlink Group 2-4	(United States) Vandenberg SLC-4E		(United States) SpaceX	
19 January; 15:43:10	(United States) Starlink × 51	SpaceX	Low Earth	Communications	In orbit	Operational
24 January; 23:00:00	(United States) Electron	"Virginia is for Launch Lovers"	(United States) MARS LC-2		(United States) Rocket Lab	
24 January; 23:00:00	(United States) Hawk 6A, 6B, 6C	HawkEye 360	Low Earth	SIGINT	In orbit	Operational
24 January; 23:00:00	First launch from Rocket Lab Launch Complex 2 at the Mid-Atlantic Regional Spaceport.					
26 January; 01:50:21	(Japan) H-IIA 202	F46	(Japan) Tanegashima LA-Y1		(Japan) MHI	
26 January; 01:50:21	(Japan) IGS-Radar 7	CSICE	Low Earth (SSO)	Reconnaissance	In orbit	Operational
26 January; 09:32:20	(United States) Falcon 9 Block 5	Starlink Group 5-2	(United States) Cape Canaveral SLC-40		(United States) SpaceX	
26 January; 09:32:20	(United States) Starlink × 56	SpaceX	Low Earth	Communications	In orbit	Operational
31 January; 16:15:00	(United States) Falcon 9 Block 5	Starlink Group 2-6	(United States) Vandenberg SLC-4E		(United States) SpaceX	
31 January; 16:15:00	(United States) Starlink × 49	SpaceX	Low Earth	Communications	In orbit	Operational
31 January; 16:15:00	(Italy) ION SCV-009 Eclectic Elena	D-Orbit	Low Earth	Payload hosting	In orbit	Operational
31 January; 16:15:00	(United States) EBAD Test Mass	EBAD	Low Earth	Dummy satellite	In orbit	Successful
31 January; 16:15:00	ION SCV-009 carries HPS' ADEO-N3, EPFL's Bunny, and StardustMe's SD-1 as hosted payloads. ION SCV-009 deployed a satellite simulator using EBAD's 8" Payload Release Ring.					
← Jan; Feb; Mar; Apr; May; Jun; Jul; Aug; Sep; Oct; Nov; Dec →; === February ===
2 February; 07:58:20	(United States) Falcon 9 Block 5	Starlink Group 5-3	(United States) Kennedy LC-39A		(United States) SpaceX	
2 February; 07:58:20	(United States) Starlink × 53	SpaceX	Low Earth	Communications	In orbit	Operational
5 February; 09:12:51	(Russia) Proton-M / DM-03		(Kazakhstan) Baikonur Site 81/24		(Russia) Roscosmos	
5 February; 09:12:51	(Russia) Elektro-L №4	Roscosmos	Geosynchronous	Meteorology	In orbit	Operational
7 February; 01:32:00	(United States) Falcon 9 Block 5	F9-202	(United States) Cape Canaveral SLC-40		(United States) SpaceX	
7 February; 01:32:00	(Spain) Amazonas Nexus (Intelsat 46)	Hispasat/Intelsat	Geosynchronous	Communications	In orbit	Operational
7 February; 01:32:00	Will replace Amazonas 2. Part of its capacity has been bought by Intelsat, with the satellite receiving the alternative designation of Intelsat 46 (IS-46).					
9 February; 06:15:36	(Russia) Soyuz-2.1a		(Kazakhstan) Baikonur Site 31/6		(Russia) Roscosmos	
9 February; 06:15:36	(Russia) Progress MS-22 / 83P	Roscosmos	Low Earth (ISS)	ISS logistics	20 August; 23:50	Successful
10 February; 03:48	(India) SSLV	D2	(India) Satish Dhawan FLP		(India) ISRO	
10 February; 03:48	(India) EOS-07 (Microsat-2B)	ISRO	Low Earth (SSO)	Earth observation	In orbit	Operational
10 February; 03:48	⚀ (India) AzaadiSAT-2	Space Kidz India	Low Earth (SSO)	Education	In orbit	Operational
10 February; 03:48	⚀ (United States) Janus-1	Antaris Space	Low Earth (SSO)	Technology demonstration	29 June 2023	Successful
10 February; 03:48	Second SSLV development flight.					
12 February; 05:10:10	(United States) Falcon 9 Block 5	Starlink Group 5-4	(United States) Cape Canaveral SLC-40		(United States) SpaceX	
12 February; 05:10:10	(United States) Starlink × 55	SpaceX	Low Earth	Communications	In orbit	Operational
17 February; 19:12:20	(United States) Falcon 9 Block 5	Starlink Group 2-5	(United States) Vandenberg SLC-4E		(United States) SpaceX	
17 February; 19:12:20	(United States) Starlink × 51	SpaceX	Low Earth	Communications	In orbit	Operational
18 February; 03:59	(United States) Falcon 9 Block 5	F9-205	(United States) Cape Canaveral SLC-40		(United States) SpaceX	
18 February; 03:59	(United Kingdom) Inmarsat-6 F2 (GX 6B)	Inmarsat	Geosynchronous	Communications	In orbit	Spacecraft failure
18 February; 03:59	The satellite suffered a power system failure in orbit that prevented it from becoming operational.					
23 February; 11:49	(China) Long March 3B/E	3B-Y93	(China) Xichang LC-2		(China) CASC	
23 February; 11:49	(China) ChinaSat-26	China Satcom	Geosynchronous	Communications	In orbit	Operational
24 February; 00:24:29	(Russia) Soyuz-2.1a		(Kazakhstan) Baikonur Site 31/6		(Russia) Roscosmos	
24 February; 00:24:29	(Russia) Soyuz MS-23	Roscosmos	Low Earth (ISS)	Uncrewed spaceflight	27 September; 11:17	Successful
24 February; 00:24:29	Uncrewed launch to replace Soyuz MS-22, which was damaged by a suspected micrometeoroid impact.					
24 February; 04:01	(China) Long March 2C	2C-Y63	(China) Jiuquan SLS-2		(China) CASC	
24 February; 04:01	(Egypt) Horus-1 (Helusi-1)	Egyptian Space Agency	Low Earth (SSO)	Earth observation	In orbit	Operational
27 February; 23:13:50	(United States) Falcon 9 Block 5	Starlink Group 6-1	(United States) Cape Canaveral SLC-40		(United States) SpaceX	
27 February; 23:13:50	(United States) Starlink × 21	SpaceX	Low Earth	Communications	In orbit	Operational
27 February; 23:13:50	First launch of Starlink V2 Mini satellites. First launch of Starlink Group 6 Satellites from Cape Canaveral.					
← Jan; Feb; Mar; Apr; May; Jun; Jul; Aug; Sep; Oct; Nov; Dec →; === March ===
2 March; 05:34:14	(United States) Falcon 9 Block 5	F9-207	(United States) Kennedy LC-39A		(United States) SpaceX	
2 March; 05:34:14	(United States) SpaceX Crew-6	SpaceX / NASA	Low Earth (ISS)	Expedition 68/69	4 September; 04:17	Successful
2 March; 05:34:14	Sixth operational Crew Dragon mission to the ISS.					
3 March; 18:38:50	(United States) Falcon 9 Block 5	Starlink Group 2-7	(United States) Vandenberg SLC-4E		(United States) SpaceX	
3 March; 18:38:50	(United States) Starlink × 51	SpaceX	Low Earth	Communications	In orbit	Operational
4 March	(Iran) Qaem 100		(Iran) Shahroud Space Center		(Iran) IRGC	
4 March	(Iran) Nahid-1	ISA	Low Earth	Communications	4 March	Launch failure
4 March	Maiden orbital flight of Qaem 100.					
7 March; 01:37:55	(Japan) H3-22S	TF1	(Japan) Tanegashima LA-Y2		(Japan) JAXA	
7 March; 01:37:55	(Japan) ALOS-3 (Daichi 3)	JAXA	Low Earth (SSO)	Earth observation	7 March	Launch failure
7 March; 01:37:55	First flight of the H3 launch vehicle. Second stage ignition could not be confirmed, leading to flight termination.					
9 March; 19:13:28	(United States) Falcon 9 Block 5	F9-209	(United States) Cape Canaveral SLC-40		(United States) SpaceX	
9 March; 19:13:28	(United Kingdom) OneWeb × 40	OneWeb	Low Earth	Communications	In orbit	Operational
9 March; 19:13:28	OneWeb #17.					
9 March; 22:41	(China) Long March 4C	4C-Y51	(China) Taiyuan LC-9		(China) CASC	
9 March; 22:41	(China) Tianhui 6A	CNSA	Low Earth (SSO)	Earth observation	In orbit	Operational
9 March; 22:41	(China) Tianhui 6B	CNSA	Low Earth (SSO)	Earth observation	In orbit	Operational
12 March; 23:12:59	(Russia) Proton-M / Briz-M		(Kazakhstan) Baikonur Site 200/39		(Russia) Roscosmos	
12 March; 23:12:59	(Russia) Olymp-K №2 (Luch-5X №2)	Ministry of Defence / Gonets Satellite System	Geosynchronous	SIGINT	In orbit	Operational
13 March; 04:02	(China) Long March 2C	2C-Y64	(China) Jiuquan SLS-2		(China) CASC	
13 March; 04:02	(Egypt) Horus-2 (Helusi-2)	Egyptian Space Agency	Low Earth (SSO)	Earth observation	In orbit	Operational
15 March; 00:30:42	(United States) Falcon 9 Block 5	F9-210	(United States) Kennedy LC-39A		(United States) SpaceX	
15 March; 00:30:42	(United States) SpaceX CRS-27	NASA	Low Earth (ISS)	ISS logistics	15 April; 20:58	Successful
15 March; 00:30:42	(United States) STP-H9	United States Air Force	Low Earth (ISS)	Technology demonstration	In orbit	Operational
15 March; 00:30:42	⚀ (United States) ARKSat-1	University of Arkansas	Low Earth	Technology demonstration	In orbit	Operational
15 March; 00:30:42	⚀ (Canada) AuroraSAT	Aurora Research Institute	Low Earth	Ionosphere magnetism Education	In orbit	Operational
15 March; 00:30:42	⚀ (Canada) Ex-Alta 2	AlbertaSat	Low Earth	Ionosphere magnetism Wildfire monitoring	In orbit	Operational
15 March; 00:30:42	⚀ (United States) LightCube	Arizona State University	Low Earth	Education	In orbit	Operational
15 March; 00:30:42	⚀ (Canada) NEUDOSE	NII / McMaster University	Low Earth	Cosmic rays measurement	In orbit	Operational
15 March; 00:30:42	⚀ (Canada) YukonSat	Yukon University	Low Earth	Ionosphere magnetism Technology demonstration	In orbit	Operational
15 March; 00:30:42	The ELaNa 50 mission, consisting of 2 CubeSats, was launched on this flight. The Ex-Alta 2, AuroraSAT and YukonSat cubesats are part of the Northern SPIRIT project with the goal of collectively studying the ionosphere magnetic field.					
15 March; 11:41	(China) Long March 11	Y11	(China) Jiuquan LS-95A		(China) CASC	
15 March; 11:41	(China) Shiyan 19	SAST	Low Earth (SSO)	Technology demonstration	In orbit	Operational
16 March; 22:38:59	(United States) Electron	"Stronger Together"	(United States) MARS LC-2		(United States) Rocket Lab	
16 March; 22:38:59	(United States) Capella 9 (Whitney 7)	Capella Space	Low Earth	Earth observation	29 March 2025	Successful
16 March; 22:38:59	(United States) Capella 10 (Whitney 8)	Capella Space	Low Earth	Earth observation	5 May 2025	Successful
17 March; 08:33	(China) Long March 3B/E	3B-Y90	(China) Xichang LC-2		(China) CASC	
17 March; 08:33	(China) Gaofen 13-02	SASTIND	Geosynchronous	Earth observation	In orbit	Operational
17 March; 19:26:40	(United States) Falcon 9 Block 5	Starlink Group 2-8	(United States) Vandenberg SLC-4E		(United States) SpaceX	
17 March; 19:26:40	(United States) Starlink × 52	SpaceX	Low Earth	Communications	In orbit	Operational
17 March; 23:38	(United States) Falcon 9 Block 5	F9-212	(United States) Cape Canaveral SLC-40		(United States) SpaceX	
17 March; 23:38	(Luxembourg) SES-18	SES S.A.	Geosynchronous	Communications	In orbit	Operational
17 March; 23:38	(Luxembourg) SES-19	SES S.A.	Geosynchronous	Communications	In orbit	Operational
22 March; 09:09	(China) Kuaizhou 1A	Y19	(China) Jiuquan LS-95A		(China) ExPace	
22 March; 09:09	(China) Tianmu-1 03–06	Xiyong Microelectronics	Low Earth (SSO)	Meteorology	In orbit	Operational
23 March; 03:25	(United States) Terran 1	"Good Luck, Have Fun"	(United States) Cape Canaveral LC-16		(United States) Relativity Space	
23 March; 03:25	(United States) Good Luck, Have Fun	Relativity Space	Low Earth	Dummy payload	23 March	Launch failure
23 March; 03:25	Maiden flight of Terran 1. The second stage engine failed to properly ignite. Terran 1 was retired after this first and only flight of the rocket.					
23 March; 06:40:11	(Russia) Soyuz-2.1a		(Russia) Plesetsk Site 43/3		(Russia) RVSN RF	
23 March; 06:40:11	(Russia) Kosmos 2567 (Bars-M 4L)	VKS	Low Earth (SSO)	Reconnaissance	In orbit	Operational
24 March; 09:14	(United States) Electron	"The Beat Goes On"	(New Zealand) Mahia LC-1B		(United States) Rocket Lab	
24 March; 09:14	(United States) BlackSky 18 (BlackSky Global 19)	BlackSky	Low Earth	Earth observation	In orbit	Operational
24 March; 09:14	(United States) BlackSky 19 (BlackSky Global 5)	BlackSky	Low Earth	Earth observation	In orbit	Operational
24 March; 09:14	Sixth dedicated launch for BlackSky.					
24 March; 15:43:10	(United States) Falcon 9 Block 5	Starlink Group 5-5	(United States) Cape Canaveral SLC-40		(United States) SpaceX	
24 March; 15:43:10	(United States) Starlink × 56	SpaceX	Low Earth	Communications	In orbit	Operational
26 March; 03:30	(India) LVM 3	M3	(India) Satish Dhawan SLP		(India) NSIL	
26 March; 03:30	(United Kingdom) OneWeb × 36	OneWeb	Low Earth	Communications	In orbit	Operational
26 March; 03:30	OneWeb #18. First use of HS-200 booster.					
28 March; 23:10	(Israel) Shavit 2		(Israel) Palmachim		(Israel) IAI	
28 March; 23:10	(Israel) Ofeq-13 (TECSAR-3)	Israel Ministry of Defence	Low Earth (Retrograde)	Reconnaissance	In orbit	Operational
29 March; 19:57:02	(Russia) Soyuz-2.1v		(Russia) Plesetsk Site 43/4		(Russia) RVSN RF	
29 March; 19:57:02	(Russia) Kosmos 2568 (EO MKA №4)	VKS	Low Earth (SSO)	Technology demonstration	3 January 2025	Successful
29 March; 20:01:00	(United States) Falcon 9 Block 5	Starlink Group 5-10	(United States) Cape Canaveral SLC-40		(United States) SpaceX	
29 March; 20:01:00	(United States) Starlink × 56	SpaceX	Low Earth	Communications	In orbit	Operational
30 March; 10:50	(China) Long March 2D	2D-Y90	(China) Taiyuan LC-9		(China) CASC	
30 March; 10:50	(China) PIESAT-1A 01	PIESAT	Low Earth (SSO)	Earth observation	In orbit	Operational
30 March; 10:50	(China) PIESAT-1B 01–03	PIESAT	Low Earth (SSO)	Earth observation	In orbit	Operational
31 March; 06:27	(China) Long March 4C	4C-Y49	(China) Jiuquan SLS-2		(China) CASC	
31 March; 06:27	(China) Yaogan 34-04	CAS	Low Earth	Reconnaissance	In orbit	Operational
← Jan; Feb; Mar; Apr; May; Jun; Jul; Aug; Sep; Oct; Nov; Dec →; === April ===
2 April; 08:48:16	(China) Tianlong-2	Y1	(China) Jiuquan LS-120		(China) Space Pioneer	
2 April; 08:48:16	⚀ (China) Jinta (Ai Taikong Kexue)	Hunan Hangsheng Satellite Technology	Low Earth (SSO)	Technology demonstration	In orbit	Operational
2 April; 08:48:16	Maiden flight of Space Pioneer's Tianlong-2 launch vehicle. First successful launch of a Chinese privately funded, liquid fueled kerolox rocket. Space Pioneer became the first private company to successfully launch a liquid fueled rocket to orbit on its first attempt.					
2 April; 14:29	(United States) Falcon 9 Block 5	F9-215	(United States) Vandenberg SLC-4E		(United States) SpaceX	
2 April; 14:29	(United States) T0TL A-Class 1-5 (Checkmate 1-5)	SDA	Low Earth	Military communications	In orbit	Operational
2 April; 14:29	(United States) T0TL B-Class 1-3 (Checkmate 6-8)	SDA	Low Earth	Military communications	In orbit	Operational
2 April; 14:29	(United States) T0TR 1,2 (BB 1,2)	SDA	Low Earth	Early warning	In orbit	Operational
2 April; 14:29	First of two launches for the Space Development Agency's Tranche 0 Transport and Tracking Layer (Tranche 0A Mission).					
7 April; 04:00	(China) Hyperbola-1	Y6	(China) Jiuquan LS-95A		(China) i-Space	
7 April; 04:00	(China) Lianyungang	i-Space	Low Earth (SSO)	Dummy payload	In orbit	Successful
7 April; 04:00	Return to flight for i-Space's Hyperbola-1 launch vehicle after three consecutive failures, the last of which took place on 13 May 2022.					
7 April; 04:30	(United States) Falcon 9 Block 5	F9-216	(United States) Cape Canaveral SLC-40		(United States) SpaceX	
7 April; 04:30	(United States) Intelsat 40e / TEMPO	Intelsat / NASA	Geosynchronous	Communications / Atmospheric pollution monitoring	In orbit	Operational
7 April; 04:30	Intelsat 40e hosts TEMPO, the first payload developed under NASA's Earth Venture Instrument program.					
14 April; 12:14:29	(France) Ariane 5 ECA	VA260	(France) Kourou ELA-3		(France) Arianespace	
14 April; 12:14:29	Jupiter Icy Moons Explorer (JUICE)	ESA	Jovicentric	Exploration of Jupiter; Ganymede orbiter	In orbit	En route
14 April; 12:14:29	The spacecraft will embark on an 8-year journey to Jupiter, including four gravity assist maneuvers at the Moon, Earth, and Venus.					
15 April; 06:48:00	(United States) Falcon 9 Block 5	Transporter-7	(United States) Vandenberg SLC-4E		(United States) SpaceX	
15 April; 06:48:00	(Italy) ION SCV-010 Masterful Matthaeus	D-Orbit	Low Earth (SSO)	CubeSat deployer	In orbit	Operational
15 April; 06:48:00	(United States) Vigoride-6	Momentus Space	Low Earth (SSO)	Space tug	In orbit	Operational
15 April; 06:48:00	(Canada) GHGSat-C6 (Mey-Lin)	GHGSat	Low Earth (SSO)	Earth observation	In orbit	Operational
15 April; 06:48:00	(Canada) GHGSat-C7 (Gaspard)	GHGSat	Low Earth (SSO)	Earth observation	In orbit	Operational
15 April; 06:48:00	(Canada) GHGSat-C8 (Océane)	GHGSat	Low Earth (SSO)	Earth observation	In orbit	Operational
15 April; 06:48:00	(United States) GHOSt 1, 2	Orbital Sidekick	Low Earth (SSO)	Earth observation	In orbit	Operational
15 April; 06:48:00	(United States) Hawk 7A, 7B, 7C	HawkEye 360	Low Earth	SIGINT	In orbit	Operational
15 April; 06:48:00	(Turkey) İMECE	TUA	Low Earth (SSO)	Earth observation	In orbit	Operational
15 April; 06:48:00	(Norway) NorSat-TD	NOSA	Low Earth (SSO)	Technology demonstration	In orbit	Operational
15 April; 06:48:00	(Argentina) ÑuSat × 4	Satellogic	Low Earth (SSO)	Earth observation	In orbit	Operational
15 April; 06:48:00	(United States) Tomorrow-R1	Tomorrow.io	Low Earth (SSO)	Technology demonstration	In orbit	Operational
15 April; 06:48:00	(United States) Umbra-06	Umbra Space	Low Earth (SSO)	Earth observation	In orbit	Operational
15 April; 06:48:00	⚀ (France) BRO-9	UnseenLabs	Low Earth (SSO)	SIGINT	In orbit	Operational
15 April; 06:48:00	⚀ (United States) Brokkr-1	AstroForge	Low Earth (SSO)	Technology demonstration	In orbit	Operational
15 April; 06:48:00	⚀ (United States) CIRBE	CU Boulder	Low Earth (SSO)	Space weather	In orbit	Operational
15 April; 06:48:00	⚀ (Turkey) Connecta T2.1	Plan-S	Low Earth (SSO)	IoT	In orbit	Operational
15 April; 06:48:00	⚀ (United Arab Emirates) DEWA SAT-2	DEWA	Low Earth (SSO)	Technology demonstration	In orbit	Operational
15 April; 06:48:00	⚀ (Denmark) DISCO-1	Aarhus University	Low Earth (SSO)	Technology demonstration	In orbit	Operational
15 April; 06:48:00	⚀ (European Union) ELO-3	Eutelsat	Low Earth (SSO)	IoT	In orbit	Operational
15 April; 06:48:00	⚀ (Sweden) (Canada) EPICHyper-1 (Wyvern-1)	AAC Clyde Space / Wyvern	Low Earth (SSO)	Earth observation	In orbit	Operational
15 April; 06:48:00	⚀ (Colombia) FACSAT-2 (Chibiriquete)	Colombian Air Force	Low Earth (SSO)	Earth observation	In orbit	Operational
15 April; 06:48:00	⚀ (France) INSPIRE-Sat 7	UVSQ / LATMOS	Low Earth (SSO)	Earth observation	In orbit	Operational
15 April; 06:48:00	⚀ (Taiwan) IRIS-C	NCKU	Low Earth (SSO)	Technology demonstration	In orbit	Operational
15 April; 06:48:00	⚀ (United States) It's About Time	TrustPoint	Low Earth (SSO)	Navigation	In orbit	Operational
15 April; 06:48:00	⚀ (Canada) Kepler-20, 21	Kepler	Low Earth (SSO)	Communications	In orbit	Operational
15 April; 06:48:00	⚀ (Turkey) KILICSAT	GUMUSH AeroSpace / UTAA	Low Earth (SSO)	Technology demonstration	In orbit	Operational
15 April; 06:48:00	⚀ (United Kingdom) LacunaSat-2F (LS2f)	Lacuna Space	Low Earth (SSO)	IoT	In orbit	Operational
15 April; 06:48:00	⚀ (United States) Lemur-2 × 3	Spire Global	Low Earth (SSO)	Earth observation	In orbit	Operational
15 April; 06:48:00	⚀ (United States) LLITED-A, B	The Aerospace Corporation	Low Earth (SSO)	Ionospheric research	In orbit	Operational
15 April; 06:48:00	⚀ (United States) PLEIADES YEARLING	Cal Poly Pomona	Low Earth (SSO)	Technology demonstration Education	In orbit	Operational
15 April; 06:48:00	⚀ (Italy) REVELA	ARCA Dynamics	Low Earth (SSO)	Technology demonstration	In orbit	Operational
15 April; 06:48:00	⚀ (Monaco) RoseyCubesat-1	Orbital Solutions Monaco	Low Earth (SSO)	Education	In orbit	Operational
15 April; 06:48:00	⚀ (United States) Sapling-2 (Sapling Giganteum)	Stanford Student Space Initiative	Low Earth (SSO)	Technology demonstration Education	In orbit	Operational
15 April; 06:48:00	⚀ (Spain) (Bulgaria) Sateliot_0 / Platform 3	Sateliot / EnduroSat	Low Earth (SSO)	IoT	In orbit	Operational
15 April; 06:48:00	⚀ (Turkey) SSS-2B	TÜBİTAK UZAY	Low Earth (SSO)	Education	In orbit	Operational
15 April; 06:48:00	⚀ (Kenya) TAIFA-1	SayariLabs	Low Earth (SSO)	Earth observation	In orbit	Operational
15 April; 06:48:00	⚀ (Brazil) VCUB1	Visiona	Low Earth (SSO)	Earth observation	In orbit	Operational
15 April; 06:48:00	⚀ (Hungary) VIREO	CS3	Low Earth (SSO)	Technology demonstration	In orbit	Operational
15 April; 06:48:00	Dedicated SmallSat Rideshare mission to sun-synchronous orbit, designated Transporter-7. ION SCV-010 carries Veoware's MicroCMG gyroscope and Elettronica Group's SCORPIO as hosted payloads. Vigoride-6 carries ARCA Dynamics' SMPOD03 cubesat deployer and Momentus Space's Tappe Spring Solar Array as hosted payloads. The ELaNa 47 mission, consisting of the CIRBE cubesat, and the ELaNa 40 mission, consisting of the two LLITED cubesats, were launched on this flight.					
16 April; 01:36:29	(China) Long March 4B	4B-Y51	(China) Jiuquan SLS-2		(China) CASC	
16 April; 01:36:29	(China) Fengyun 3G	CMA	Low Earth	Meteorology	In orbit	Operational
19 April; 14:31:10	(United States) Falcon 9 Block 5	Starlink Group 6-2	(United States) Cape Canaveral SLC-40		(United States) SpaceX	
19 April; 14:31:10	(United States) Starlink × 21	SpaceX	Low Earth	Communications	In orbit	Operational
22 April; 08:50	(India) PSLV-CA	C55	(India) Satish Dhawan FLP		(India) NSIL	
22 April; 08:50	(Singapore) TeLEOS-2	AgilSpace	Low Earth	Earth observation	In orbit	Operational
22 April; 08:50	⚀ (Singapore) Lumelite-4	NUS	Low Earth	Technology demonstration	In orbit	Operational
22 April; 08:50	POEM-2 is also launched in this mission.					
27 April; 13:40:50	(United States) Falcon 9 Block 5	Starlink Group 3-5	(United States) Vandenberg SLC-4E		(United States) SpaceX	
27 April; 13:40:50	(United States) Starlink × 46	SpaceX	Low Earth (SSO)	Communications	In orbit	Operational
27 April; 13:40:50	Last launch of Starlink Group 3 Satellites.					
28 April; 22:12	(United States) Falcon 9 Block 5	F9-220	(United States) Cape Canaveral SLC-40		(United States) SpaceX	
28 April; 22:12	(Luxembourg) O3b mPOWER 3 (O3b FM23)	SES S.A.	Medium Earth	Communications	In orbit	Operational
28 April; 22:12	(Luxembourg) O3b mPOWER 4 (O3b FM24)	SES S.A.	Medium Earth	Communications	In orbit	Operational
← Jan; Feb; Mar; Apr; May; Jun; Jul; Aug; Sep; Oct; Nov; Dec →; === May ===
1 May; 00:26	(United States) Falcon Heavy	FH-006	(United States) Kennedy LC-39A		(United States) SpaceX	
1 May; 00:26	(United States) ViaSat-3 Americas	ViaSat	Geosynchronous	Communications	In orbit	Operational
1 May; 00:26	(United States) Arcturus (Aurora-4A)	Astranis / Pacific Dataport	Geosynchronous	Communications	In orbit	Operational
1 May; 00:26	⚀ (United States) (Indonesia) G-Space 1 (Nusantara-H1-A)	Gravity Space / PSN	Geosynchronous	Communications	In orbit	Operational
1 May; 00:26	First launch of a fully expended Falcon Heavy. Astranis Block 1 mission. ViaSat-3 Americas, though operational, suffered an antenna deployment failure after launch that reduced its capacity by over ninety percent, triggering a $421 million insurance claim.					
4 May; 07:31:00	(United States) Falcon 9 Block 5	Starlink Group 5-6	(United States) Cape Canaveral SLC-40		(United States) SpaceX	
4 May; 07:31:00	(United States) Starlink × 56	SpaceX	Low Earth	Communications	In orbit	Operational
8 May; 01:00	(United States) Electron	"Rocket Like A Hurricane"	(New Zealand) Mahia LC-1B		(United States) Rocket Lab	
8 May; 01:00	⚀ (United States) TROPICS × 2	NASA	Low Earth	Earth observation	In orbit	Operational
8 May; 01:00	Launch of two of the four remaining satellites for the TROPICS constellation.					
10 May; 13:22:51	(China) Long March 7	Y7	(China) Wenchang LC-2		(China) CASC	
10 May; 13:22:51	(China) Tianzhou 6	CMSA	Low Earth (TSS)	Space logistics	19 January 2024; 12:37	Successful
10 May; 13:22:51	⚀ (China) Dalian-1 Lianli	Dalian University of Technology	Low Earth	Earth observation	In orbit	Operational
10 May; 13:22:51	Cargo flight to the Tiangong space station. The Dalian-1 Lianli cubesat was deployed from the TSS on 18 January 2024.					
10 May; 20:09:00	(United States) Falcon 9 Block 5	Starlink Group 2-9	(United States) Vandenberg SLC-4E		(United States) SpaceX	
10 May; 20:09:00	(United States) Starlink × 51	SpaceX	Low Earth	Communications	In orbit	Operational
14 May; 05:03:30	(United States) Falcon 9 Block 5	Starlink Group 5-9	(United States) Cape Canaveral SLC-40		(United States) SpaceX	
14 May; 05:03:30	(United States) Starlink × 56	SpaceX	Low Earth	Communications	In orbit	Operational
17 May; 02:49	(China) Long March 3B/E	3B-Y87	(China) Xichang LC-2		(China) CASC	
17 May; 02:49	(China) BeiDou-3 G4 (BeiDou 56)	CNSA	Geosynchronous	Navigation	In orbit	Operational
19 May; 06:19:30	(United States) Falcon 9 Block 5	Starlink Group 6-3	(United States) Cape Canaveral SLC-40		(United States) SpaceX	
19 May; 06:19:30	(United States) Starlink × 22	SpaceX	Low Earth	Communications	In orbit	Operational
20 May; 13:16:33	(United States) Falcon 9 Block 5	F9-225	(United States) Vandenberg SLC-4E		(United States) SpaceX	
20 May; 13:16:33	(United States) Iridium NEXT × 5	Iridium	Low Earth	Communications	In orbit	Operational
20 May; 13:16:33	(United Kingdom) OneWeb × 15	OneWeb	Low Earth	Communications	In orbit	Operational
20 May; 13:16:33	(United Kingdom) JoeySat	OneWeb / ESA	Low Earth	Technology demonstration	In orbit	Operational
20 May; 13:16:33	Iridium-9 rideshare mission, carrying up to five Iridium NEXT satellites, 15 OneWeb Gen1 satellites, and a Gen2 test satellite (Iridium-9 & OneWeb #19 Mission).					
21 May; 08:00	(China) Long March 2C	Y60	(China) Jiuquan SLS-2		(China) CASC	
21 May; 08:00	(Macau) Aomen Kexue-1A (Macao Science-1A)	MUST	Low Earth	Space weather	In orbit	Operational
21 May; 08:00	(Macau) Aomen Kexue 1B (Macao Science-1B)	MUST	Low Earth	Space weather	In orbit	Operational
21 May; 08:00	(China) Luojia-2 01	Wuhan University	Low Earth	Technology demonstration	In orbit	Operational
21 May; 08:00	Macao Science-1A and Macao Science-1B, the first Macao satellites, were launched on this flight.					
21 May; 21:37:09	(United States) Falcon 9 Block 5	F9-226	(United States) Kennedy LC-39A		(United States) SpaceX	
21 May; 21:37:09	(United States) Ax-2	SpaceX / Axiom Space	Low Earth (ISS)	Space tourism	31 May; 03:04	Successful
21 May; 21:37:09	Axiom Mission 2, launching on Crew Dragon. 10-day private crewed mission carrying four (one professional and three private) astronauts to the International Space Station.					
24 May; 12:56:07	(Russia) Soyuz-2.1a		(Kazakhstan) Baikonur Site 31/6		(Russia) Roscosmos	
24 May; 12:56:07	(Russia) Progress MS-23 / 84P	Roscosmos	Low Earth (ISS)	ISS logistics	29 November; 11:02	Successful
24 May; 12:56:07	(Russia) Parus-MGTU	BMSTU	Low Earth	Solar sail	In orbit	Spacecraft failure
24 May; 12:56:07	The Parus-MGTU nanosatellite was released in orbit from ISS on 26 October 2023 during the VKD-61 spacewalk but suffered a malfunctioning that prevented the deployment of its solar sails.					
25 May; 09:24	(South Korea) Nuri (KSLV-II)		(South Korea) Naro LC-2		(South Korea) KARI	
25 May; 09:24	(South Korea) NEXTSat-2	KAIST	Low Earth (SSO)	Technology demonstration	In orbit	Operational
25 May; 09:24	⚀ (South Korea) JLC-101-v1-2	Justek	Low Earth (SSO)	Earth observation	In orbit	Operational
25 May; 09:24	⚀ (South Korea) KSAT3U	Kairo Space	Low Earth (SSO)	Meteorology	In orbit	Operational
25 May; 09:24	⚀ (South Korea) Lumir-T1	Lumir	Low Earth (SSO)	Space radiation monitoring	In orbit	Operational
25 May; 09:24	⚀ (South Korea) SNIPE × 4	KASI	Low Earth (SSO)	Space weather	In orbit	Operational
25 May; 09:24	Third launch of Nuri.					
26 May; 03:46	(United States) Electron	"Coming To A Storm Near You"	(New Zealand) Mahia LC-1B		(United States) Rocket Lab	
26 May; 03:46	⚀ (United States) TROPICS × 2	NASA	Low Earth	Earth observation	In orbit	Operational
26 May; 03:46	Launch of the final two satellites for the TROPICS constellation.					
26 May; 21:14:51	(Russia) Soyuz-2.1a / Fregat		(Russia) Vostochny Site 1S		(Russia) Roscosmos	
26 May; 21:14:51	(Russia) Kondor-FKA №1	Roscosmos	Low Earth	Reconnaissance	In orbit	Operational
27 May; 03:25	(United States) Falcon 9 Block 5	F9-227	(United States) Cape Canaveral SLC-40		(United States) SpaceX	
27 May; 03:25	(Saudi Arabia) Arabsat-7B (BADR-8)	Arabsat	Geosynchronous	Communications	In orbit	Operational
29 May; 05:12	(India) GSLV Mk II	F12	(India) Satish Dhawan SLP		(India) ISRO	
29 May; 05:12	(India) NVS-01 (IRNSS-1J)	ISRO	Geosynchronous	Navigation	In orbit	Operational
29 May; 05:12	Replacement for IRNSS-1G. Next generation NaVic satellite.					
30 May; 01:31	(China) Long March 2F/G	2F-Y16	(China) Jiuquan SLS-1		(China) CASC	
30 May; 01:31	(China) Shenzhou 16	CMSA	Low Earth (TSS)	Crewed spaceflight	31 October; 00:12	Successful
30 May; 01:31	Fifth crewed flight to the Tiangong space station.					
30 May; 21:27	(North Korea) Chŏllima 1		(North Korea) Sohae		(North Korea) NADA	
30 May; 21:27	(North Korea) Malligyong-1	KCST	Low Earth	Reconnaissance	30 May 2023	Launch failure
30 May; 21:27	Maiden flight of the Chollima-1 launch vehicle. Launch failed after an abnormal ignition of the second stage.					
31 May; 06:02:30	(United States) Falcon 9 Block 5	Starlink Group 2-10	(United States) Vandenberg SLC-4E		(United States) SpaceX	
31 May; 06:02:30	(United States) Starlink × 52	SpaceX	Low Earth	Communications	In orbit	Operational
31 May; 06:02:30	200th consecutive success of Falcon 9. Last launch of Starlink Group 2 Satellites.					
← Jan; Feb; Mar; Apr; May; Jun; Jul; Aug; Sep; Oct; Nov; Dec →; === June ===
4 June; 12:20:00	(United States) Falcon 9 Block 5	Starlink Group 6-4	(United States) Cape Canaveral SLC-40		(United States) SpaceX	
4 June; 12:20:00	(United States) Starlink × 22	SpaceX	Low Earth	Communications	In orbit	Operational
5 June; 15:47:00	(United States) Falcon 9 Block 5	F9-230	(United States) Kennedy LC-39A		(United States) SpaceX	
5 June; 15:47:00	(United States) SpaceX CRS-28	NASA	Low Earth (ISS)	ISS logistics	30 June; 14:30	Successful
5 June; 15:47:00	(United States) iROSA 1A, 1B	NASA	Low Earth (ISS)	Space Station Photo Voltaic Module	In orbit	Operational
5 June; 15:47:00	⚀ (Canada) ESSENCE	York University	Low Earth	Earth observation	In orbit	Operational
5 June; 15:47:00	⚀ (Canada) Iris	University of Manitoba	Low Earth	Space weathering	In orbit	Operational
5 June; 15:47:00	⚀ (Philippines) Maya-5	UP Diliman	Low Earth	Technology demonstration	8 December	Successful
5 June; 15:47:00	⚀ (Philippines) Maya-6	UP Diliman	Low Earth	Technology demonstration	12 December	Successful
5 June; 15:47:00	⚀ (United States) Moonlighter	The Aerospace Corporation	Low Earth	Technology demonstration	In orbit	Operational
5 June; 15:47:00	⚀ (Canada) RADSAT-SK	University of Saskatchewan	Low Earth	Radiation detection	In orbit	Operational
5 June; 15:47:00	⚀ (Canada) SC-ODIN	Concordia University	Low Earth	Earth observation	In orbit	Operational
5 June; 15:47:00	⚀ (Canada) Ukpik-1	Western University / Nunavut Arctic College	Low Earth	Education	In orbit	Operational
5 June; 15:47:00	The ESSENCE, Iris, Moonlighter, RADSAT-SK, SC-ODIN and Ukpik-1 cubesats were deployed from the ISS on 6 July 2023. The Maya-5 and Maya-6 cubesats were deployed from the ISS on 19 July 2023.					
7 June; 04:10:02	(China) Kinetica 1	Y2	(China) Jiuquan LS-130		(China) CAS Space	
7 June; 04:10:02	(China) Shiyan 24A	CASIC	Low Earth (SSO)	Technology demonstration	In orbit	Operational
7 June; 04:10:02	(China) Shiyan 24B	CASIC	Low Earth (SSO)	Technology demonstration	In orbit	Operational
7 June; 04:10:02	(China) Fucheng-1	Spacety	Low Earth (SSO)	Earth observation	In orbit	Operational
7 June; 04:10:02	(China) Tianyi 26	Spacety	Low Earth (SSO)	Technology demonstration	In orbit	Operational
7 June; 04:10:02	(China) Xi'an Hangtou-8	Xi'an Aerospace	Low Earth (SSO)	Earth observation	In orbit	Operational
7 June; 04:10:02	⚀ (China) CXPD (X Shexian Pianzheng Lifang)	Guangxi University	Low Earth (SSO)	X-ray astronomy	In orbit	Operational
7 June; 04:10:02	(China) 20 undisclosed satellites	TBA	Low Earth (SSO)	TBA	In orbit	Operational
7 June; 04:10:02	The rocket carried a total of 26 satellites, of which 20 remain currently undisclosed, setting a new record for Chinese launch vehicles. Despite the lack of an explicit acknowledgment, Chang Guang Satellite Technology's claim to have launched 68 satellites in the first half of the year would leave a 21 satellites gap closely matching the number of undisclosed payloads of this launch.					
9 June; 02:35	(China) Kuaizhou 1A	Y20	(China) Jiuquan LS-95A		(China) ExPace	
9 June; 02:35	(China) Longjiang-3	HIT	Low Earth	Communications	In orbit	Operational
12 June; 07:10:50	(United States) Falcon 9 Block 5	Starlink Group 5-11	(United States) Cape Canaveral SLC-40		(United States) SpaceX	
12 June; 07:10:50	(United States) Starlink × 52	SpaceX	Low Earth	Communications	In orbit	Operational
12 June; 21:35:00	(United States) Falcon 9 Block 5	Transporter-8	(United States) Vandenberg SLC-4E		(United States) SpaceX	
12 June; 21:35:00	(Italy) ION SCV-011 Savvy Simon	D-Orbit	Low Earth (SSO)	CubeSat deployer	In orbit	Operational
12 June; 21:35:00	(United States) Orbiter SN3	Launcher	Low Earth (SSO)	Space tug	In orbit	Spacecraft failure
12 June; 21:35:00	(India) ABA First Runner (AFR-1)	Azista BST Aerospace	Low Earth (SSO)	Earth observation	In orbit	Operational
12 June; 21:35:00	(United States) Blackjack × 4	DARPA	Low Earth (SSO)	Reconnaissance	In orbit	Operational
12 June; 21:35:00	(United States) Droid.001	Turion Space	Low Earth (SSO)	Space debris monitoring	In orbit	Operational
12 June; 21:35:00	(Chile) (Israel) FASat-Delta / RUNNER-1	FACh / ISI	Low Earth (SSO)	Earth observation	In orbit	Operational
12 June; 21:35:00	(United States) GHOSt 3	Orbital Sidekick	Low Earth (SSO)	Earth observation	In orbit	Operational
12 June; 21:35:00	(United Kingdom) HotSat-1	Satellite Vu	Low Earth (SSO)	Earth observation	In orbit	Successful; Partial spacecraft failure
12 June; 21:35:00	(Finland) ICEYE × 4	ICEYE	Low Earth (SSO)	Earth observation	In orbit	Operational
12 June; 21:35:00	(United States) MuSat-1	Muon Space	Low Earth (SSO)	Technology demonstration	In orbit	Operational
12 June; 21:35:00	(Argentina) ÑuSat × 4	Satellogic	Low Earth (SSO)	Earth observation	In orbit	Operational
12 June; 21:35:00	(United States) Otter Pup	Starfish Space	Low Earth (SSO)	Satellite docking	In orbit	Operational
12 June; 21:35:00	(Japan) AMATERU-III (QPS-SAR-6)	iQPS	Low Earth (SSO)	Earth observation	In orbit	Operational
12 June; 21:35:00	(Australia) Skykraft-3	Skykraft	Low Earth (SSO)	Satellite deployer	In orbit	Operational
12 June; 21:35:00	(Australia) Skykraft ATM × 4	Skykraft	Low Earth (SSO)	Air traffic management	In orbit	Operational
12 June; 21:35:00	(United States) Tomorrow-R2	Tomorrow.io	Low Earth (SSO)	Technology demonstration	In orbit	Operational
12 June; 21:35:00	(United States) Winnebago-1	Varda Space Industries	Low Earth (SSO)	Technology demonstration	21 February 2024; 21:40	Successful
12 June; 21:35:00	⚀ (United States) AII-Delta	Aurora Insight	Low Earth (SSO)	Technology demonstration	In orbit	Operational
12 June; 21:35:00	⚀ (Israel) Ayris-1, 2	TBA	Low Earth (SSO)	TBA	In orbit	Operational
12 June; 21:35:00	⚀ (European Union) ELO-4	Eutelsat	Low Earth (SSO)	IoT	In orbit	Operational
12 June; 21:35:00	⚀ (Germany) EIVE	University of Stuttgart	Low Earth (SSO)	Communication	In orbit	Operational
12 June; 21:35:00	⚀ (Sweden) (Canada) EPICHyper-2 (Wyvern-2)	AAC Clyde Space / Wyvern	Low Earth (SSO)	Earth observation	In orbit	Operational
12 June; 21:35:00	⚀ (Germany) FOREST-2 (OroraTech 2)	OroraTech	Low Earth (SSO)	Wildfire monitoring	In orbit	Operational
12 June; 21:35:00	⚀ (Spain) GEI-SAT	Satlantis	Low Earth (SSO)	Methane monitoring	In orbit	Operational
12 June; 21:35:00	⚀ (Belgium) Grégoire	Aerospacelab	Low Earth (SSO)	Technology demonstration	In orbit	Operational
12 June; 21:35:00	⚀ (Sweden) (United States) Kelpie 2	AAC Clyde Space / Orbcomm	Low Earth (SSO)	IoT / AIS	In orbit	Spacecraft failure
12 June; 21:35:00	⚀ (United States) Lemur-2 × 2	Spire Global	Low Earth (SSO)	Earth observation	In orbit	Operational
12 June; 21:35:00	⚀ (Argentina) MDQSAT-1C, 1D	Innova Space	Low Earth (SSO)	IoT	In orbit	Operational
12 June; 21:35:00	⚀ (United States) MISR-A, B	United States Department of Defense	Low Earth (SSO)	Technology demonstration	In orbit	Operational
12 June; 21:35:00	⚀ (United States) Outpost Mission 1	Outpost Space	Low Earth (SSO)	Technology demonstration	In orbit	Operational
12 June; 21:35:00	⚀ (United States) Pleiades-Squared	Cal Poly Pomona	Low Earth (SSO)	Technology demonstration	In orbit	Operational
12 June; 21:35:00	⚀ (United States) SpaceBEE × 12	Swarm Technologies	Low Earth (SSO)	Communication	In orbit	Operational
12 June; 21:35:00	⚀ (Vatican City) (Italy) SpeiSat	Dicastery for Communication / ASI	Low Earth (SSO)	Religious broadcasting	In orbit	Operational
12 June; 21:35:00	⚀ (Luxembourg) Tiger-4	OQ Technology	Low Earth (SSO)	IoT	In orbit	Operational
12 June; 21:35:00	⚀ (United States) XVI	AFRL	Low Earth (SSO)	Technology demonstration	In orbit	Operational
12 June; 21:35:00	▫ (Spain) FOSSASat FEROX × 4	FOSSA Systems	Low Earth (SSO)	IoT	In orbit	Operational
12 June; 21:35:00	▫ (Turkey) Istanbul	Hello Space	Low Earth (SSO)	Technology demonstration	In orbit	Operational
12 June; 21:35:00	▫ (Hungary) MRC-100	BME	Low Earth (SSO)	Electrosmog monitoring	In orbit	Operational
12 June; 21:35:00	▫ (Romania) ROM-2	ICHSB	Low Earth (SSO)	Technology demonstration	In orbit	Operational
12 June; 21:35:00	▫ (Israel) Satlla-2I	Ariel University	Low Earth (SSO)	Communication	In orbit	Operational
12 June; 21:35:00	▫ (United Kingdom) Unicorn-2I	Alba Orbital	Low Earth (SSO)	Earth observation	In orbit	Operational
12 June; 21:35:00	▫ (Spain) URESAT-1	AMSAT-EA	Low Earth (SSO)	Amateur radio	In orbit	Operational
12 June; 21:35:00	Dedicated SmallSat Rideshare mission to sun-synchronous orbit, designated Transporter-8. Orbiter-SN3 carries Celsium Astro's Nightingale-1, Millennium Space Systems' Remora and TRL11's TRL11-SN3-Demo as hosted payloads. ION SCV-011 carries SpacePNT's NaviLEOTM navigation receiver, ODIN Space's ODIN-DU1 debris detector and UKRI's SWIMMR-1 radiation monitor as hosted payloads. The STP-CR2301 mission, consisting of the MISR-A, MISR-B and XVI cubesats, has been launched on this flight.					
15 June; 05:30	(China) Long March 2D	2D-Y88	(China) Taiyuan LC-9		(China) CASC	
15 June; 05:30	(China) Jilin-1 Gaofen-03D (19-26)	Chang Guang Satellite Technology	Low Earth (SSO)	Earth observation	In orbit	Operational
15 June; 05:30	(China) Jilin-1 Gaofen-05A 01	Chang Guang Satellite Technology	Low Earth (SSO)	Earth observation	In orbit	Operational
15 June; 05:30	(China) Jilin-1 Gaofen-06A (01-30)	Chang Guang Satellite Technology	Low Earth (SSO)	Earth observation	In orbit	Operational
15 June; 05:30	(China) Jilin-1 Pingtai-02A (01-02)	Chang Guang Satellite Technology	Low Earth (SSO)	Earth observation	In orbit	Operational
15 June; 05:30	The rocket carried a total of 41 satellites, setting a new record for Chinese launch vehicles. Jilin-1 Gaofen-05A-01 is also known as Khorgas 1.					
18 June; 22:21:00	(United States) Falcon 9 Block 5	F9-233	(United States) Cape Canaveral SLC-40		(United States) SpaceX	
18 June; 22:21:00	(Indonesia) Satria (Nusantara-3/Nusantara Tiga)	PSN	Geosynchronous	Communications	In orbit	Operational
20 June; 03:18	(China) Long March 6	Y12	(China) Taiyuan LC-16		(China) CASC	
20 June; 03:18	(China) Shiyan 25	SAST	Low Earth (SSO)	Technology demonstration	In orbit	Operational
22 June; 07:17	(United States) Falcon 9 Block 5	Starlink Group 5-7	(United States) Vandenberg SLC-4E		(United States) SpaceX	
22 June; 07:17	(United States) Starlink × 47	SpaceX	Low Earth	Communications	In orbit	Operational
22 June; 07:17	First launch of Starlink Group 5 Satellites from Vandenberg.					
22 June; 09:18:00	(United States) Delta IV Heavy	D-388	(United States) Cape Canaveral SLC-37B		(United States) ULA	
22 June; 09:18:00	(United States) Orion 11 (USA-345)	NRO	Geosynchronous	SIGINT	In orbit	Operational
22 June; 09:18:00	NROL-68 mission.					
23 June; 15:35:10	(United States) Falcon 9 Block 5	Starlink Group 5-12	(United States) Cape Canaveral SLC-40		(United States) SpaceX	
23 June; 15:35:10	(United States) Starlink × 56	SpaceX	Low Earth	Communications	In orbit	Operational
27 June; 11:34:49	(Russia) Soyuz-2.1b / Fregat		(Russia) Vostochny Site 1S		(Russia) Roscosmos	
27 June; 11:34:49	(Russia) Meteor-M №2-3	Roscosmos	Low Earth (SSO)	Meteorology	In orbit	Operational
27 June; 11:34:49	(Russia) Rassvet-1 × 3	Bureau 1440	Low Earth (SSO)	Communication	In orbit	Operational
27 June; 11:34:49	⚀ (Russia) Ahmat-1	Chechen State University	Low Earth (SSO)	Air traffic management	In orbit	Operational
27 June; 11:34:49	⚀ (Russia) ArcCube-01	FIRON / Arcturus	Low Earth (SSO)	Education	In orbit	Operational
27 June; 11:34:49	⚀ (Malaysia) A-SEANSAT-PG1	ANGKASA-X	Low Earth (SSO)	Technology demonstration	In orbit	Operational
27 June; 11:34:49	⚀ (Russia) Avion	Moscow State University	Low Earth (SSO)	Technology demonstration	In orbit	Operational
27 June; 11:34:49	⚀ (Belarus) BSUSat-2	Belarusian State University	Low Earth (SSO)	Technology demonstration	In orbit	Operational
27 June; 11:34:49	⚀ (Russia) CSTP-1.1, 1.2	Special Technology Center	Low Earth (SSO)	Technology demonstration	In orbit	Operational
27 June; 11:34:49	⚀ (Russia) Cube-SX-HSE-3	Higher School of Economics	Low Earth (SSO)	Earth observation	In orbit	Operational
27 June; 11:34:49	⚀ (Russia) Impuls-1	MISiS	Low Earth (SSO)	Solar radiation monitoring	In orbit	Operational
27 June; 11:34:49	⚀ (Russia) Khors-1, 2	IPG Roshydromet	Low Earth (SSO)	Space weather	In orbit	Operational
27 June; 11:34:49	⚀ (Russia) KuzGTU-1	KuzSTU	Low Earth (SSO)	Technology demonstration	In orbit	Operational
27 June; 11:34:49	⚀ (Russia) Monitor-2, 3, 4	MSU	Low Earth (SSO)	Gamma-ray astronomy	In orbit	Operational
27 June; 11:34:49	⚀ (Russia) Nanosond-1	Orel State University	Low Earth (SSO)	Space weather	In orbit	Operational
27 June; 11:34:49	⚀ (Russia) NORBI 2	Novosibirsk State University	Low Earth (SSO)	Space weather	In orbit	Operational
27 June; 11:34:49	⚀ (United Arab Emirates) PHI-Demo	MBRSC	Low Earth (SSO)	IoT	In orbit	Operational
27 June; 11:34:49	⚀ (Russia) Polytech Universe-3	SPbPU	Low Earth (SSO)	Electromagnetic radiation research	In orbit	Operational
27 June; 11:34:49	⚀ (Russia) ReshUCube-2	SibGU	Low Earth (SSO)	Communications / IoT	In orbit	Operational
27 June; 11:34:49	⚀ (Russia) SamSat-ION	Samara University	Low Earth (SSO)	Earth magnetosphere study	In orbit	Operational
27 June; 11:34:49	⚀ (Russia) Saturn	KubSTU	Low Earth (SSO)	Space weather	In orbit	Operational
27 June; 11:34:49	⚀ (Russia) Sirius-SINP-3U	BG-Optics	Low Earth (SSO)	Radiation detection	In orbit	Operational
27 June; 11:34:49	⚀ (Russia) SITRO-AIS × 8	Sitronics Group	Low Earth (SSO)	AIS ship tracking	In orbit	Operational
27 June; 11:34:49	⚀ (Russia) StratoSat TK-1	Stratonavitka	Low Earth (SSO)	CubeSat deployer	In orbit	Operational
27 June; 11:34:49	⚀ (Russia) TinySat × 6	Stratonavitka	Low Earth (SSO)	Technology demonstration	In orbit	Operational
27 June; 11:34:49	⚀ (Russia) Svyatobor-1	MEPhI	Low Earth (SSO)	Wildfire monitoring	In orbit	Operational
27 June; 11:34:49	⚀ (Russia) UmKa-1	Podolsk School No. 27	Low Earth (SSO)	Education	In orbit	Operational
27 June; 11:34:49	⚀ (Russia) UTMN-2	Tyumen State University	Low Earth (SSO)	Meteorology	In orbit	Operational
27 June; 11:34:49	⚀ (Russia) Vizard-meteo	New Intelligent Systems	Low Earth (SSO)	Meteorology	In orbit	Operational
27 June; 11:34:49	⚀ (Russia) Yarilo-3, 4	IPG Roshydromet	Low Earth (SSO)	Geomagnetic field monitoring	In orbit	Operational
27 June; 11:34:49	⚀ (Russia) Zorkiy-2M	Sputnix	Low Earth (SSO)	Earth observation	In orbit	Operational
27 June; 11:34:49	GK Launch Services commercial rideshare mission.					
← Jan; Feb; Mar; Apr; May; Jun; Jul; Aug; Sep; Oct; Nov; Dec →
For flights after 30 June, see 2023 in spaceflight (July–December)

== Suborbital flights ==
Date and time (UTC)	Rocket	Flight number	Launch site		LSP	
Date and time (UTC)	Payload (⚀ = CubeSat)	Operator	Orbit	Function	Decay (UTC)	Outcome
Date and time (UTC)	Remarks					
6 January	(Pakistan)		(Pakistan)		Pakistan Army	
6 January	(Pakistan)	Pakistan Army	Suborbital	Missile test	6 January	Launch failure
6 January	Missile deviated from course during flight.					
10 February; 07:01	(United States) Minuteman III		(United States) Vandenberg LF-10		(United States) AFGSC	
10 February; 07:01	(United States)	AFGSC	Suborbital	Test flight	10 February	Successful
10 February; 07:01	Re-entered ~4,200 mi (6,800 km) downrange near Kwajalein Atoll.					
16 February; 12:00:00	(United States) Improved Orion		(United States) Wallops Flight Facility		(United States) NASA	
16 February; 12:00:00	(United States) MesOrion	NASA / Wallops	Suborbital	Technology demonstration	16 February	Successful
16 February; 12:00:00	First of two launches.					
16 February; 12:28:00	(United States) Improved Orion		(United States) Wallops Flight Facility		(United States) NASA	
16 February; 12:28:00	(United States) MesOrion	NASA / Wallops	Suborbital	Technology demonstration	16 February	Successful
16 February; 12:28:00	Second of two launches.					
18 February; 08:21	(North Korea) Hwasong-15		(North Korea) Sunan		(North Korea) KPA Strategic Force	
18 February; 08:21	(North Korea)	KPA Strategic Force	Suborbital	Missile test	18 February; 09:27	Successful
18 February; 08:21	Apogee: ~5,700 km (3,500 mi).					
18 February	(Russia) RS-28 Sarmat		(Russia) Plesetsk		(Russia) RVSN	
18 February	(Russia)	RVSN	Suborbital	Missile test	18 February	Launch failure
19 February; 10:00	(North Korea) KN-25		(North Korea)		(North Korea) KPA Strategic Force	
19 February; 10:00	(North Korea)	KPA Strategic Force	Suborbital	Missile test	19 February	Successful
19 February; 10:00	Apogee: ~100 km (62 mi).					
13 March	(United States) AGM-183 ARRW		(United States) Boeing B-52 Stratofortress		United States Air Force	
13 March	(United States) Live hypersonic glide vehicle	United States Air Force	Suborbital	Missile test	13 March	Failure
13 March	Failed during flight					
15 March; 22:10	(North Korea) Hwasong-17		(North Korea) Sunan		(North Korea) KPA Strategic Force	
15 March; 22:10	(North Korea)	KPA Strategic Force	Suborbital	Missile test	15 March; 23:20	Successful
15 March; 22:10	Apogee: 6,045 km (3,756 mi).					
19 March; 17:52	(South Korea) HANBIT-TLV		(Brazil) Alcântara		(South Korea) Innospace	
19 March; 17:52	(Brazil) SISNAV	DCTA	Suborbital	Inertial navigation	19 March	Successful
19 March; 17:52	First test flight of the HANBIT-TLV suborbital launch vehicle. Expected apogee: 80 km (50 mi).					
23 March; 18:23:00	(United States) Improved Malemute/Improved Orion	BROR	(Sweden) Esrange		(Sweden) SSC	
23 March; 18:23:00	(Sweden) BROR	IRF	Suborbital	Auroral ionosphere	23 March	Successful
23 March; 18:23:00	Apogee: 240 km (150 mi).					
23 March; 21:00:00	(Canada) Black Brant IX		(Norway) Andøya		(United States) NASA	
23 March; 21:00:00	(United States) VortEX	Clemson University	Suborbital	Vapor trail deployment	23 March; 21:09	Successful
23 March; 21:00:00	First of two launches for the Vorticity Experiment (VortEx) mission, carrying trimethylaluminum (TMA) vapor trails. Apogee: 149.3 km (92.8 mi).					
23 March; 21:02:00	(United States) Terrier-Improved Orion		(Norway) Andøya		(United States) NASA	
23 March; 21:02:00	(United States) VortEx	Clemson University	Suborbital	Gravity wave research	23 March; 21:12	Successful
23 March; 21:02:00	First of two launches for the VortEx mission, carrying payload instruments. Apogee: 363.5 km (225.9 mi).					
23 March	(United States) PTV		(United States) Ronald Reagan Ballistic Missile Defense Test Site		(United States) Orbital ATK	
23 March	(United States) Patriot target vehicle	SMC	Suborbital	ABM target	23 March	Successful
23 March	Ballistic missile target for interception					
23 March	(United States) MIM-104 Patriot		(United States) Ronald Reagan Ballistic Missile Defense Test Site		(United States) SMC	
23 March	(United States)	SMC	Suborbital	ABM test	23 March	Successful
23 March	Ballistic missile interceptor					
29 March; 04:30:00	(United States) Improved Orion		(Sweden) Esrange		(Germany) (Sweden) MORABA / SNSA	
29 March; 04:30:00	(Germany) (Sweden) REXUS-30	DLR / SNSA	Suborbital	Education	29 March	Successful
29 March; 04:30:00	Apogee: 77.3 km (48.0 mi).					
30 March	(United States) MRBM T3C2	FTM-31 E1a	(United States) Pacific Missile Range Facility		(United States) MDA	
30 March	(United States) SM-6 target	MDA	Suborbital	ABM target	30 March	Successful
30 March	Aegis Weapon System 31 Event 1a, a test of the Aegis Ballistic Missile Defense System. MRBM target for two SM-6 Dual II missiles. Intercepted.					
30 March	(United States) SM-6 Dual II	FTM-31 E1a	(United States) USS Daniel Inouye		MDA / United States Navy	
30 March	(United States) Kill vehicle	United States Navy	Suborbital	ABM test	30 March	Successful intercept
30 March	Flight Test Aegis Weapon System 31 Event 1a, a test of the Aegis Ballistic Missile Defense System. Launch of two SM-6 Dual II missiles. Successfully launched.					
30 March	(United States) SM-6 Dual II	FTM-31 E1a	(United States) USS Daniel Inouye		MDA / United States Navy	
30 March	(United States) Kill vehicle	United States Navy	Suborbital	ABM test	30 March	Successful intercept
30 March	Flight Test Aegis Weapon System 31 Event 1a, a test of the Aegis Ballistic Missile Defense System. Launch of two SM-6 Dual II missiles. Successfully launched.					
1 April; 04:20:00	(United States) Improved Orion		(Sweden) Esrange		(Germany) (Sweden) MORABA / SNSA	
1 April; 04:20:00	(Germany) (Sweden) REXUS-29	DLR / SNSA	Suborbital	Education	1 April	Successful
1 April; 04:20:00	Apogee: 76.9 km (47.8 mi).					
12 April; 22:23	(North Korea) Hwasong-18		(North Korea) Sunan		(North Korea) KPA Strategic Force	
12 April; 22:23	(North Korea)	KPA Strategic Force	Suborbital	Missile test	12 April	Successful
12 April; 22:23	Apogee: ~6,000 km (3,700 mi).					
12 April	(Russia) Topol-ME		(Russia) Kapustin Yar		(Russia) RVSN	
12 April	(Russia)	RVSN	Suborbital	Missile test	12 April	Successful
14 April	(China) B-611?		(China)		(China) PLA	
14 April	(China)	PLA	Suborbital	ABM target	14 April	Successful
14 April	Interceptor target					
14 April	(China) SC-19?		(China)		(China) PLA	
14 April	(China)	PLA	Suborbital	ABM test	14 April	Successful
14 April	Interceptor, successful intercept.					
16 April; 05:03:00	(Canada) Black Brant IX		(United States) White Sands Missile Range		(United States) NASA	
16 April; 05:03:00	(United States) CIBER-2	Rochester Institute of Technology	Suborbital	EBL anisotropy	16 April	Launch failure
16 April; 05:03:00	Second flight of the CIBER-2 experiment.					
19 April	(France) M51		(France) Le Terrible		(France)	
19 April	(France) Re-entry vehicle	French Navy	Suborbital	Missile test	19 April	Successful
19 April; 12:11	(United States) Minuteman III	GT246	(United States) Vandenberg LF-09		United States Air Force	
19 April; 12:11	(United States) Test reentry vehicle	United States Air Force	Suborbital	Test flight	19 April	Successful
20 April; 13:33:08	(United States) Starship	Flight 1	(United States) Starbase OLP-A		(United States) SpaceX	
20 April; 13:33:08	No payload	SpaceX	Transatmospheric	Flight test	20 April	Launch failure
20 April; 13:33:08	First Starship orbital velocity test flight, aiming to complete about three-quarters of an orbit and landing in the Pacific Ocean northwest of Kauai. The launch resulted in a failure, with the flight termination system being triggered after a failed stage separation.					
22 April; 15:12	(United States) Gold Chain Cowboy		(United States) FAR Test Site		(United States) Evolution Space	
22 April; 15:12	(United States)	Evolution Space	Suborbital	Test flight	22 April	Successful
22 April; 15:12	Apogee: 124.5 km (77.4 mi).					
24 April; 05:20:00	(Brazil) VSB-30		(Sweden) Esrange		(Germany) MORABA	
24 April; 05:20:00	(Germany) TEXUS-58	DLR / ESA	Suborbital	Microgravity research	24 April	Successful
24 April; 05:20:00	Apogee: 250 km (160 mi). Rocket slightly deviated from the planned trajectory and landed in Norway rather than Sweden as intended.					
24 April; 10:10:00	(Germany) N_{2}ORTH		(Sweden) Esrange		(Germany) DLR	
24 April; 10:10:00	(Germany)	DLR / University of Stuttgart (HyEnD)	Suborbital	Technology demonstration	24 April	Launch failure
24 April; 10:10:00	Aimed to exceed an apogee of 100 km (62 mi). Second of two launches. Failed 20 seconds into the flight. The first launch on 18 April was not intended to reach space and reached an altitude of 64 km.					
25 April; 23:15:00	(United States) Terrier-Improved Malemute		(United States) Wallops Flight Facility		(United States) NASA	
25 April; 23:15:00	(United States) SubTEC-9	NASA	Suborbital	Technology demonstration	25 April	Successful
1 May; 16:45	(United States) SpaceLoft XL	SL-17	(United States) Spaceport America		(United States) UP Aerospace	
1 May; 16:45	(United States) FOP-8 / Celestis 18	NASA / Celestis	Suborbital	Education; Space burial	1 May	Launch failure
1 May; 16:45	Part of NASA's TechRise Student Challenge and Celestis Aurora Flight.					
3 May; 18:30:00	(Canada) Black Brant IX		(United States) White Sands Missile Range		(United States) NASA	
3 May; 18:30:00	(United States) SDO EVE Underflight Calibration Experiment	CU Boulder	Suborbital	Satellite instrument calibration	3 May	Successful
3 May; 18:30:00	Launching a copy of the EVE instrument on NASA's Solar Dynamics Observatory for calibration purposes.					
20 May	(United States) MESOS		(United States) Black Rock Desert		(United States) Kip Daugirdas	
20 May	(United States)	Kip Daugirdas	Suborbital	Amateur rocket	20 May	Failure
20 May	Second staged experienced coning during flight, resulting in launch failure. Both stages recovered. Apogee: 28.65 km (17.80 mi).					
22 May; 05:00:32	(United States) Improved Malemute/Improved Malemute		(Sweden) Esrange		(Germany) DLR	
22 May; 05:00:32	(Germany) MAPHEUS-13	DLR	Suborbital	Microgravity research	22 May	Successful
22 May; 05:00:32	Apogee: 225.5 km (140.1 mi).					
24 May	(Iran) Khoramshahr-4		(Iran)		(Iran) IRGC	
24 May	(Iran)	IRGC	Suborbital	Missile test	24 May	Successful
25 May; 16:23	(United States) SpaceShipTwo	Unity 25	(United States) Spaceport America		(United States) Virgin Galactic	
25 May; 16:23	(United States) Virgin Galactic Unity 25	Virgin Galactic	Suborbital	Crewed spaceflight	25 May; 16:37	Successful
25 May; 16:23	Final VSS Unity test flight, carrying Virgin Galactic employees. Apogee: 87.2 km (54.2 mi).					
15 June?	(United States) UGM-133 Trident II		(United States) USS West Virginia (SSBN-736)		United States Navy	
15 June?	(United States)	United States Navy	Suborbital	Missile test	15 June?	Successful
15 June?	1 of 2.					
15 June?	(United States) UGM-133 Trident II		(United States) USS West Virginia (SSBN-736)		United States Navy	
15 June?	(United States)	United States Navy	Suborbital	Missile test	15 June?	Successful
15 June?	2 of 2.					
18 June; 01:24	(United States) HASTE	"Scout's Arrow"	(United States) MARS LC-2		(United States) Rocket Lab	
18 June; 01:24	(United States) DYNAMO-A	Dynetics	Suborbital	Technology demonstration	18 June	Successful
18 June; 01:24	First flight of the HASTE suborbital program. Part of Multi-Service Advanced Capability Hypersonic Test Bed (MACH-TB) program.					
26 June; 20:00	(United States) Terrier Terrier Oriole		(France) DGA Essais de missiles		(France)	
26 June; 20:00	(France) VMaX hypersonic glider	DGA	Suborbital	Test flight	26 June	Successful
29 June; 15:28:38	(United States) SpaceShipTwo	Galactic 01	(United States) Spaceport America		(United States) Virgin Galactic	
29 June; 15:28:38	(United States) Galactic 01	Virgin Galactic	Suborbital	Crewed spaceflight	29 June; 15:42:28	Successful
29 June; 15:28:38	First VSS Unity commercial service flight, carrying members of the Italian Air Force. Apogee: 85.1 km (52.9 mi).					
