= Satellites of Bulgaria =

List of artificial satellites developed in Bulgaria.

== Satellites ==
Large/Micro/Cube/Nano satellites
Satellite	Developed by	Type	Launch Date	Launch site	Launcher	Mass	Status	Note
Bulgaria 1300	(Bulgaria) Bulgarian Academy of Sciences	Scientific	7 August 1981	(Soviet Union) Plesetsk Cosmodrome	(Soviet Union) Vostok-2M	1,500 kg (3,300 lb)	Decommissioned	
(Bulgaria) BulgariaSat-1	(United States) SSL(Space Systems Loral)	Communications	23 June 2017	(United States) Kennedy Space Center	(United States) Falcon 9	3,669 kg (8,089 lb)	In Service	
(Bulgaria) EnduroSat One	(Bulgaria) EnduroSat	Educational, Amateur Radio	29 June 2018	(United States) Cape Canaveral	(United States) Falcon 9	1.33 kg (2.9 lb)	Decommissioned	
(Bulgaria) SPARTAN	(Bulgaria) EnduroSat	Multi-payload	30 June 2021	(United States) Cape Canaveral	(United States) Falcon 9	12 kg (26 lb)	In Service	
(Bulgaria) Platform 1	(Bulgaria) EnduroSat	Technology Demonstration	25 May 2022	(United States) Cape Canaveral	(United States) Falcon 9	12 kg (26 lb)	In Service	
(Bulgaria) Platform 2	(Bulgaria) EnduroSat	Space Weather and Propulsion Demonstration	3 January 2023	(United States) Cape Canaveral	(United States) Falcon 9	12 kg (26 lb)	In Service	
(Bulgaria) (Spain) Platform 3	(Bulgaria) EnduroSat	5G IoT Connectivity Demonstration	15 April 2023	(United States) Cape Canaveral	(United States) Falcon 9	12 kg (26 lb)	In Service	
(Kenya) TAIFA-1	(Bulgaria) EnduroSat	Earth Observation	15 April 2023	(United States) Cape Canaveral	(United States) Falcon 9	6 kg (13 lb)	In Service	Developed for Kenyan Space Agency and SayariLabs.
(Bulgaria) Platform 5	(Bulgaria) EnduroSat	Multi-payload	11 November 2023	(United States) Cape Canaveral	(United States) Falcon 9	12 kg (26 lb)	In Service	
(United States) OSW Cazorla	(Bulgaria) EnduroSat	Scientific Research and Technology Demonstration	11 November 2023	(United States) Cape Canaveral	(United States) Falcon 9	6 kg (13 lb)	In Service	Developed for Odyssey SpaceWorks.
(United States) Barry	(Bulgaria) EnduroSat	Orbital Robotics Demonstration	11 November 2023	(United States) Cape Canaveral	(United States) Falcon 9	24 kg (53 lb)	In Service	Developed for Rogue Space Systems.
(Taiwan) Pearl-1C, 1H	(Bulgaria) EnduroSat	Communications	11 November 2023	(United States) Cape Canaveral	(United States) Falcon 9	12 kg (26 lb)	In Service	Developed for Foxconn.
(Bulgaria) (European Union) Balkan-01	(Bulgaria) EnduroSat	Earth Observation	Mid 2024 and after	N/A	N/A	20 kg (44 lb)	Planned	Part of The Balkan Constellation project in which will be launched 120 nano/cube satellites.
(European Union) ESPA	(Bulgaria) EnduroSat/ (Germany) Vyoma GmbH	Space Observation	End of 2024 and after	N/A	N/A	N/A	Planned	EnduroSat will build 12 ESPA microsatellites for Vyoma's Space Situational Awareness Constellation project.
(Botswana) BOTSAT-1	(Bulgaria) EnduroSat/ Botswana International University of Science and Technology	Earth Observation	February 2025	(United States) Space Launch Complex	(United States) Falcon 9	N/A	Planned	Will be Botswana's first satellite.
(Bulgaria) Platform 6	(Bulgaria) EnduroSat	N/A	N/A	N/A	N/A	N/A	Planned	Planned to be launched.
(Bulgaria) Platform 7	(Bulgaria) EnduroSat	N/A	N/A	N/A	N/A	N/A	Planned	Planned to be launched.
(Bulgaria) Platform 8	(Bulgaria) EnduroSat	N/A	N/A	N/A	N/A	N/A	Planned	Planned to be launched.
(Bulgaria) Platform 9	(Bulgaria) EnduroSat	N/A	N/A	N/A	N/A	N/A	Planned	Planned to be launched.
(Bulgaria) Platform 10	(Bulgaria) EnduroSat	N/A	N/A	N/A	N/A	N/A	Planned	Planned to be launched.
