= D-Orbit =

Private Italian aerospace company

- Type: Private
- Industry: Aerospace
- Founded: 2011; 15 years ago
- Founders: Luca Rossettini; Renato Panesi
- Headquarters: Italy
- Products: Private spaceflight; space tug
- Number of employees: 200 (2022)
- Website: dorbit.space

D-Orbit (as in de-orbit) is a private aerospace company, headquartered in Italy. D-Orbit is mainly active in private spaceflight and space tug services, also known as orbital transfer vehicles (OTV).

D-Orbit has been operating commercial ION missions since September 2020, deploying satellites for Planet Labs, EnduroSat, Elecnor Deimos, University of Southern California, SatRevolution, and Kleos; and operating payloads for the German HPS, High Performance Space Structure Systems, the Instituto de Astrofísica de Canarias (IAC), and the Swiss data security company Cysec SA.

The company has subsidiaries in Portugal, the United Kingdom, and the United States where it also has a joint venture, D-Orbit USA.

== History ==
D-Orbit was founded in 2011 by Luca Rossettini, chief executive officer (CEO), and Renato Panesi, chief commercial officer (CCO).

The company's initial focus was the development of a smart and autonomous decommissioning motor for satellites and launcher stages called D3 (D-Orbit Decommissioning Device). In 2015, the D3 project was partially funded by the European Union under the framework of Horizon 2020. This provided the origin of the D-orbit name, being just a contraction of the term "de-orbit", which denotes an orbital manoeuver that pulls a spacecraft out of its operational orbit and inserts it into a reentry trajectory that will eventually cause it to burn up upon atmospheric entry.

In 2017, the company began the development of ION Satellite Carrier, an orbital transfer vehicle able to host a batch of satellites, transport them across orbits, and release each one of them, individually, into a custom orbital slot and operate third-party payloads. The OTV performed its first commercial mission in September 2020.

In 2022, the company planned to go public via a SPAC with a valuation of $1.4bn, however this was cancelled. In June 2022, the company gained an award of around 1.95 million Euros from the European Space Agency though a 'Boost! award'.

In January 2024, D-Orbit raised €100 million in Series C funding, from Marubeni Corporation, Avantgarde, CDP Venture Capital SGR, Seraphim Space, United Ventures, Indaco Venture Partners, Neva SGR SpA, and others.

On July 10, 2024, D-Orbit established a joint venture in the United States called D-Orbit USA to enter the satellite manufacturing business. Mike Cassidy, who formerly founded Apollo Fusion (a satellite electric propulsion startup acquired by Astra in 2021), is the chief executive of D-Orbit USA. The joint venture plans to develop a satellite bus, capable of accommodating payloads up to 200 kilograms with up to 226 watts of orbital average power (OAP), featuring both chemical and electric propulsion options, and designed for a five-year operational lifespan.

On September 27, 2024, D-Orbit announced the completion of its €150 million (US$166 million) Series C funding round. The investment was led by Marubeni Corporation, with participation from existing investors CDP Venture Capital, Seraphim Space Investment Trust, Indaco Venture Partners, Neva SGR, and Primo Ventures, as well as new investors including Avantgarde, Iberis Capital, European Innovation Council (EIC) Fund, Phaistos Investment Fund, Terna Forward, and a consortium led by United Ventures that included the European Investment Bank and European Investment Fund. According to a company press release, D-Orbit stated that the new funding would "aid in creating a 'circular space economy', turning space debris into a valuable resource" and that "future advances in in-orbit servicing will enable the collection and recycling of debris in orbit, as well as the manufacture of spacecraft for interplanetary travel."

On October 14, 2024, D-Orbit announced a €119.6 million (US$131 million) contract with the European Space Agency (ESA) to develop a spacecraft servicing vehicle called General Expansion Architecture (GEA) for in-orbit servicing in geostationary orbit. The contract was signed at the International Astronautical Congress in Milan, with the first mission, known as RISE, expected to launch in 2028. The mission aims to demonstrate rendezvous, docking, and attitude and orbit control capabilities with a client satellite in geostationary orbit. In addition to life extension, GEA will support satellite relocation and repair, and in the long-term, it aims to recycle valuable spacecraft components, aligning with ESA's goal to reduce space debris. The project is supported by several European space agencies, including the Italian Space Agency, UK Space Agency, German Aerospace Center (DLR), the Swiss Space Office, and the Spanish Space Agency (AEE). The RISE mission falls under ESA's Active Debris Removal/In-Orbit Servicing (ADRIOS) project, which is part of ESA's Space Safety Programme aimed at developing technologies for rendezvous, capture, and safe disposal of space debris and extending the operational life of functioning satellites.

== Products and space launches ==
The initial plan was to create a product to deorbit satellites at the end of their life. However the company has moved on to space tugs also known as 'orbital transfer vehicles' (OTV). D-orbit developed the ION Satellite Carrier formerly known as 'ION CubeSat Carrier'. The company aims to address the space logistics needs of customers by reducing the time needed to transfer a single spacecraft or a batch of satellites belonging to a constellation from a parking orbit to their designated operational slot. The company's core solution is D-Orbit's proprietary launch and deployment orbital transfer vehicle (OTV) ION Satellite Carrier to perform last-mile delivery of the customer's satellites. D-Orbit's OTV is also able to perform in-orbit demonstration (IOD) of third-party payloads hosted onboard thanks to a plug-and-play mechanical, electrical, and data interface that streamlines integration and in-orbit operations.

=== ION Satellite Carrier ===
ION Satellite Carrier is a satellite platform with a configurable payload bay that can be equipped with a combination of proprietary or third-party launch dispensers, third-party payloads, microsatellites, and instruments like lenses and antennas to be tested in orbit.

Through the course of a mission, ION Satellite Carrier can travel across orbits characterized by different orientation, altitude, and local time of ascending node (LTAN), deploy the satellites on board into custom, individual orbital slots and perform experiments on hosted payloads in the designated operating envelope.

In early 2024 D-Orbit announced an upcoming "in-space technological demonstration" of a radically new development. The RocketStar Drive harnesses the power of nuclear fusion to improve the performance of RocketStar's "water-fueled pulsed plasma thruster." In the process, boronated water is injected into the exhaust plume of a pulsed plasma thruster, developing ionizing radiation and increased the base propulsion by 50%. This new concept has already validated in two Small Business Innovation Research (SBIR) Phase 1 and Phase 2 tests. In space tests are expected during an upcoming SpaceX Transporter rideshare mission, likely to launch between July and October 2024.

=== Launches ===
The first mission was launched in September 2020 with the successful deployment of 12 SuperDove satellites for Earth-imaging company Planet Labs.

In January 2021, D-Orbit launched a second ION mission, Pulse, which successfully deployed 20 satellites after performing a 10km orbit raise and demonstrated the ability to change the LTAN.

During its third mission, launched in June 2021, the company deployed six satellites and demonstrated 12 hosted payloads, including D-Orbit's proprietary in-orbit cloud computing platform and data storage service built in collaboration with Swedish-based AI company Unibap, which performed 23 SpaceCloud compatible applications.

The fourth mission, Dashing Through the Stars, launched in January 2022, deployed six satellites and tested several in-space cloud applications on an upgraded version of its in-orbit cloud platform.

The fifth mission, Spacelust, launched on 1 April 2022, deployed 4 satellites for Kleos Space, 3 satellites for the University of Chile and one for Upmosphere.

The sixth mission, Infinite Blue launched on 25 May 2022, deployed Guardian for Aistech Space and SBUDNIC for Brown University. There were also hosted payloads from Cryptosat and Genergo for in-orbit demonstration.

Two of D-Orbit's space tug's were launched on SpaceX's Transporter-6 mission on 3 January 2023, to release nine satellites: four cubesats for a data relay and asset tracking constellation owned by the Swiss company Astrocast, two for Futura which includes NPS Spacemind, Kelpie, a 9-pound (4-kilogram) CubeSat to provide maritime tracking services for Orbcomm, Sharjah Sat 1 for Sharjah Academy for Astronomy, and TauSat 2 for Tel Aviv University. There are also third-party hosted payloads by the Instituto de Astrofisica de Canarias, Genergo, Cryptosat and an undisclosed customer's hosted payload.

The ninth space tug, SVC009 Eclectic Elena was launched on 31 January 2023 as a rideshare on the Starlink 2-6 mission and the mission was called Starfield. There was an in orbit demonstration of a satellite simulator for EBAD and hosted payloads for HPF, EPFL, and StardustMe.

By January 2023, the company had launched nine spacecraft and brought over 100 payloads to space.

On July 7, 2026, they launched their 23rd mission, Above the Summer Sky. This mission deployed ION SCV Joyful Julia into a Sun-Synchronous Orbit, with the goal of deploying three satellites in orbit.
