= List of Philippine satellites =

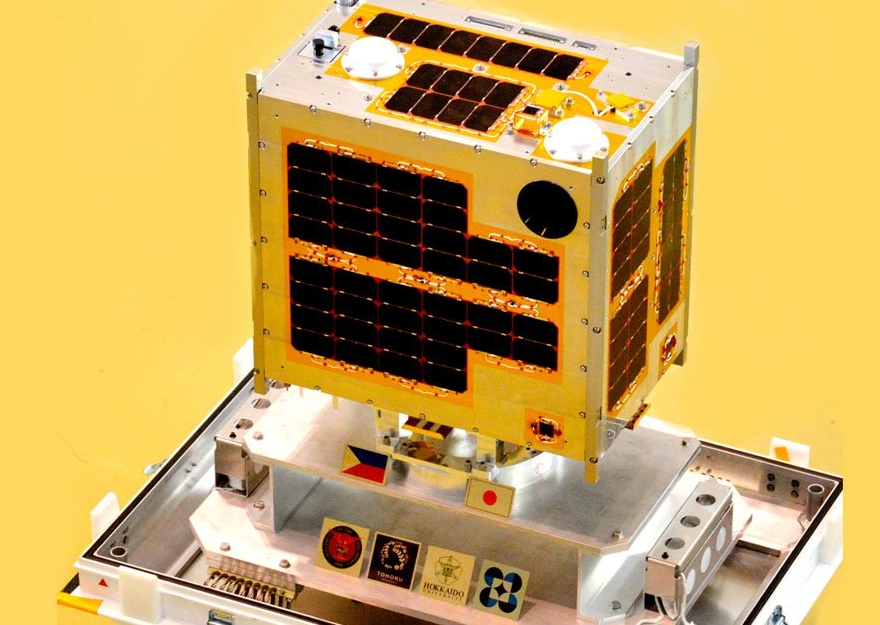
Diwata-1

This list covers satellites built and/or operated by entities in the Philippines – by private firms based in the Philippines or by the Philippine government. The first Philippine satellites were operated by private companies. The first Filipino-owned satellite is Agila-1, a satellite acquired in 1996 by Mabuhay Satellite Corporation from PT Pasifik Satelit Nusantara, an Indonesian company. The first Philippine satellite launched to space was Agila-2 which was placed to orbit in 1997.

The Philippine Space Agency is the lead government organization of the Philippine space program since 2019 but all active satellites are built and operated by the Department of Science and Technology (DOST) and its child agencies. The DOST was behind Diwata-1 which was launched to space in 2016 and was the first satellite built and designed by Filipinos and Maya-1 was the first nano-satellite owned by the Philippines and was launched in 2018. Additional Maya satellites were developed and launched in cooperation with JAXA under the Birds program (official name: Joint Global Multi Nation Birds) with the Kyushu Institute of Technology.

The Philippines presently does not have orbital launch capability, and has historically relied on other nations' space programs to launch their satellites into orbit.

== List ==
Philippine satellites by launch date
Designation	Class	Launch			Deployment			Mission Status	Summary
Designation	Class	Date	Site	Vehicle	Date	Site	Vehicle	Mission Status	Summary
Agila-1	Satellite	March 20, 1987	Cape Canaveral SLC-17	Delta-3920 PAM-D	March 20, 1987	GEO	N/A	Decommissioned in January 1998	Privately owned (Mabuhay). First Philippine satellite through acquisition while in orbit. Formerly named Palapa B2-P (Indonesia).
Agila-2	Satellite	August 19, 1997	Xichang 2	Chang Zheng 3B	August 19, 1997	GEO	N/A	Decommissioned August 2017: Sold to Asia Broadcast Satellite (renamed into ABS-3)	Privately owned (Mabuhay). First Philippine Satellite launched into space.
Agila	Satellite	December 29, 2024	Cape Canaveral SLC-40	Falcon 9 Block 5	December 29, 2024	GEO	N/A	Active	Privately owned (Orbits Corp). Built by Astranis, repurposed satellite originally assigned as Andesat-1.
Diwata-1	Micro	March 23, 2016	Cape Canaveral SLC-41	Atlas V 401	April 27, 2016	ISS	Kibo module	Decommissioned on April 6, 2020	First microsatellite of the Philippines.
Maya-1	Cubesat	June 29, 2018	Cape Canaveral SLC-40	SpaceX CRS-15	August 10, 2018	ISS	Kibo module	Completed on November 23, 2020	First nanosatellite of the Philippines.
Diwata-2	Micro	October 29, 2018	Tanegashima Space Center LC-Y	H-IIA	October 29, 2018	LEO	N/A	Active	Replacement of Diwata-1.
Maya-2	Cubesat	February 20, 2021	Mid-Atlantic Regional Spaceport	Antares 230+	February 21, 2021	ISS	Cygnus NG-15	Deorbited on July 5, 2022	Replacement of Maya-1.
Maya-3	Cubesat	August 29, 2021	Kennedy Space Center, LC-39A	SpaceX CRS-23	October 6, 2021	ISS	Kibo module	Deorbited on July 25, 2022	Same bus design as Maya-1. Deployed simultaneously with Maya-4 as the country's first university-built satellites.
Maya-4	Cubesat	August 29, 2021	Kennedy Space Center, LC-39A	SpaceX CRS-23	October 6, 2021	ISS	Kibo module	Deorbited on July 27, 2022	Same bus design as Maya-1. Deployed simultaneously with Maya-3 as the country's first university-built satellites.
Maya-5	Cubesat	June 5, 2023	Kennedy Space Center, LC-39A	SpaceX CRS-28	July 19, 2023	ISS	Kibo module	Deorbited on December 8, 2023	Same bus design as Maya-1. Deployed simultaneously with Maya-6 as the country's second university-built satellites.
Maya-6	Cubesat	June 5, 2023	Kennedy Space Center, LC-39A	SpaceX CRS-28	July 19, 2023	ISS	Kibo module	Deorbited on December 12, 2023	Same bus design as Maya-1. Deployed simultaneously with Maya-5 as the country's second university-built satellites.
MULA	Satellite	April 2027 (planned)	Vandenberg Space Force Base, SLC-4E	Falcon 9 Block 5	April 2027 (planned)	LEO	N/A	Planned	
