= Seraphim Space =

Global space investment

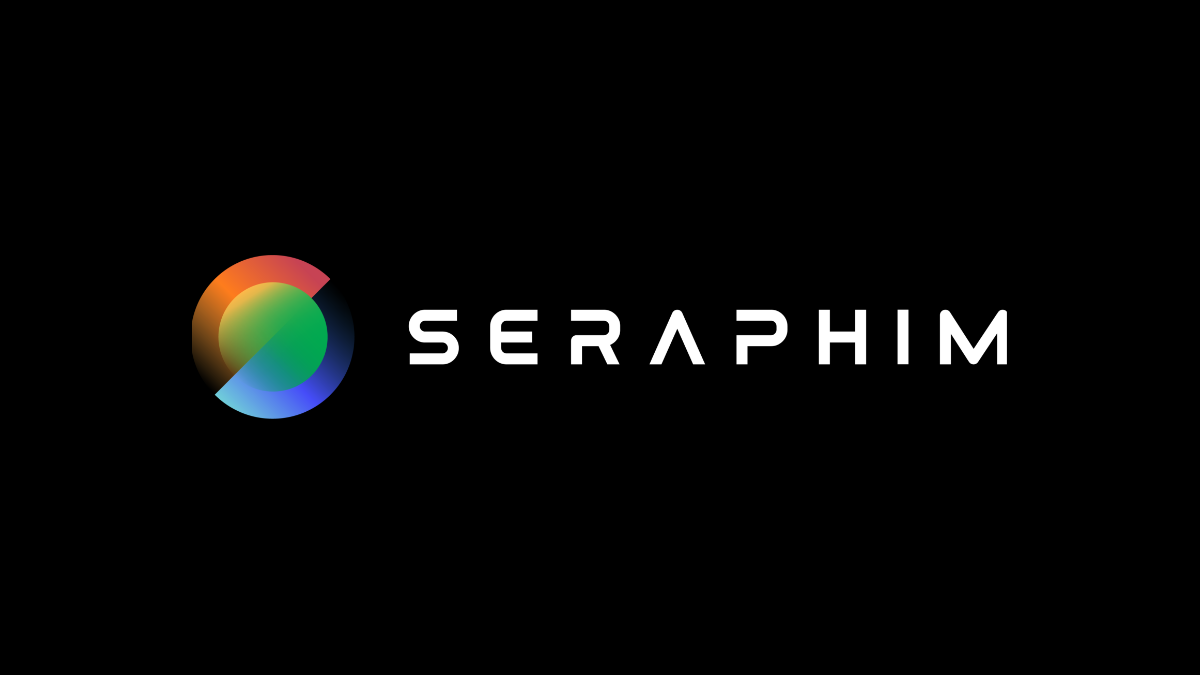
- Type: Private
- Industry: Space technology; Venture Capital
- Founded: 2016
- Founder: Mark Boggett (Chief Executive Officer); James Bruegger (Chief Investment Officer); Rob Desborough (Partner)
- Headquarters: London, England, UK
- Number of employees: 11-50
- Website: https://seraphim.vc

Seraphim Space is a global investment firm specialising in space technology (SpaceTech). Headquartered in London, the company operates across the innovation lifecycle, investing in enterprises from early-stage development through to initial public offering (IPO). It manages multiple investment vehicles, including venture capital funds, a publicly listed investment trust, and an accelerator programme.

== History ==
Seraphim Space was founded in 2016 by Mark Boggett, James Bruegger, and Rob Desborough. The founders established the firm to capitalise on opportunities in the emerging commercial space sector, focusing on supporting companies developing space-related technologies. The firm’s objective was to create a specialist investment vehicle capable of identifying and scaling businesses operating at the intersection of space and commercial applications.

== Operations and investment activities ==
=== Seraphim Space Investment Trust ===
The Seraphim Space Investment Trust plc (SSIT) was listed on the London Stock Exchange in 2021. The trust provides public market investors with access to a diversified portfolio of growth-stage space technology companies. SSIT was seeded with holdings from Seraphim’s earlier private funds and continues to expand its portfolio through follow-on investments and new opportunities. Its focus includes exposure to early and growth-stage private SpaceTech businesses operating in sectors such as defence and security, climate, communications, and sustainability.

=== Seraphim Space Venture Funds ===
Seraphim Space launched its first venture capital fund in 2016, dedicated exclusively to space-related technologies. In 2024, the firm introduced a second vehicle, Seraphim Space Ventures II, targeting seed and Series A investments. The funds aim to support companies as they transition from technical validation to commercial deployment, with Seraphim acting as both lead investor and strategic co-investor.

=== Seraphim Space Accelerator ===
The Seraphim Space Accelerator was established in 2017 as a global accelerator programme dedicated to space technology start-ups. Operating across three continents, it has supported more than 100 companies. The programme offers mentorship, technical guidance, and access to investors. Collectively, portfolio and alumni companies have raised several billion dollars.

== Investment Strategy and Portfolio ==
Since its inception, Seraphim Space has invested in over 140 space technology companies. The firm’s investment strategy targets businesses in sectors such as defence and security, Earth observation, satellite communications, geospatial intelligence, orbital logistics, and climate monitoring. Some portfolio companies have completed public listings, including Voyager and Astroscale. Notable portfolio holdings across its private and listed funds include ICEYE, D-Orbit, ALL.SPACE, Voyager Technologies, LeoLabs, Pixxel, Spire Global, AST SpaceMobile, Skylo Technologies, and Xona Space Systems.

== Global Presence ==
Seraphim Space maintains offices across the United Kingdom, Europe, and the United States. In the US, the firm operates under the brand Generation Space, headquartered in San Francisco.
