= Agila (satellite) =

Philippine satellite

- Names: Andesat-1; Philippines Sat-2
- Mission type: Communications
- Operator: Astranis; Orbits Corporation
- COSPAR ID: 2024-252C
- SATCAT no.: 62456
- Mission duration: 7–10 years (planned); 11 months and 29 days (elapsed)

Spacecraft properties
- Bus: MicroGEO
- Manufacturer: Astranis
- Launch mass: 400 kg (880 lb)

Start of mission
- Launch date: 29 December 2024, 05:00 UTC
- Rocket: Falcon 9 Block 5 B1083.7
- Launch site: Cape Canaveral, SLC-40

Orbital parameters
- Reference system: Earth (GEO)
- Regime: Geosynchronous transfer (GTO)
- Semi-major axis: 42,225.69 km (26,237.83 mi)
- Eccentricity: 0.8010187
- Perigee altitude: 8,402.12 km (5,220.84 mi)
- Apogee altitude: 76,049.26 km (47,254.82 mi)
- Inclination: 11.495°
- Period: 23.987 h (0.9994 days)
- RAAN: 355.611°
- Argument of perigee: 187.873°
- Mean anomaly: 139.023°
- Epoch: 21 January 2025 (JD 2460697.0846765)

Agila is a communications satellite built by Astranis Space Technologies and operated by Orbits Corporation which is planned to serve the Philippines.

== History ==
United States-based Astranis Space Technologies and Philippines-based Orbits Corporation announced in November 2023 a partnership to launch at least two MicroGEO satellites named Agila to exclusively serve the Philippine market. The collaboration is valued US$400 million.

It is meant to provide internet connection to remote areas in the country, as well as select Philippine government agencies and infrastructure such as airports, hospitals, and police stations.

The first Agila satellite successfully launched from the United States on December 29, 2024 after suffering a launch abort on December 21. It is projected to be operational by February 14, 2025 once it establishes its position over the Philippines.

== See also ==
- List of Philippine satellites
