= Space programme of Kenya =

The space programme of Kenya has been largely shaped by Kenya's equatorial latitude, and has basis of existed foreign infrastructure and experience. The development of the programme started in May 2012.

== History ==
External videos
- Beyond the Earth: How does Kenya benefit from Luigi Broglio Space Center? (Part 1)
- Beyond the Earth: How does Kenya benefit from Luigi Broglio Space Center? (Part 2)

The first satellite launched from Kenya's soil was in 1970. The satellite, named Uhuru, was equipped to study celestial X-ray astronomy. Kenya was involved in the launching of the San Marco Malindi satellites. Discussions for a space centre began in 1983, but stalled.

== Space centre development ==
Estimated costs for the space centre are KSh.10 billion/=. The main goal of the space agency is to develop Earth observation satellites that can be used to monitor things from the weather to ongoing violence. The space centre project is being driven by Dr John Kimani, the lead scientist at the Ministry of Defence.

== Conditions ==
As one of only a handful of equatorial states, and because it is bordered to the east by the Indian Ocean, Kenya is ideally sited for a spaceport to efficiently launch satellites into geostationary and other orbits.

The closest regional facility, and the only one ever active in East Africa, is the Italian-owned Broglio Space Centre (also known as San Marco) near the Kenyan coast. In 1962, the agreements between Italy and Kenya and between University of Rome La Sapienza and Royal Technical College (now University of Nairobi) were signed and prolonged later for using of Kenyan territorial waters and building of base camp for two main sea platforms of the spaceport on Kenyan territory near Ras Ngomeni and Ungwana Bay. Later, for servicing of San Marco spaceport among other needs, a tracking station in the nearest Kenyan city of Malindi was created (and still operates) by Italy and ESA.

After the end of the operation of the San Marco/Broglio space centre by Italy, the Kenyan government attempted to found a mostly commercial national space programme based on a retake of this spaceport and the use of Malindi station but the idea caused economic and diplomatic troubles between Kenya and Italy and the idea was discarded.

== Developments ==
In building a launchpad for modern rockets to be able to launch satellites into geostationary orbit, Kenya intends to involve other partners such as Ukraine that already produce launch vehicles for sea-platform Sea Launch spaceports. The Kenyan government offered Ukraine the right to develop the spaceport for launch of its own rockets and the facilities for assembly of satellites. The collaboration with Sapienza University of Rome has allowed to produce 1KUNS-PF, the first Kenyan nano-satellite, consisting in a 1U CubeSat developed both by the University of Nairobi (the ex-Royal Technical College) and the S5Lab research team of the Italian University. The satellite was launched on 11 May 2018 from the International Space Station.

== In fiction ==
In Andy Weir's novel Artemis, Kenya achieves dominance in the space launch industry due to its fuel-saving location on the equator and political changes made by the government in the book.

== See also ==
- Ugandan space initiatives
