= Balkan Constellation =

European satellite constellation for Earth observation

- Manufacturer: EnduroSat
- Country of origin: Bulgaria; European Union; European Space Agency
- Website: www.endurosat.com/projects/the-balkan-constellation/

Production
- Planned: 120
- Launched: 3
- Maiden launch: 14 January 2025

Related spacecraft
- Launch vehicle: Falcon 9

The Balkan Constellation is a satellite constellation of multispectral Earth observation satellites developed by the Bulgarian company EnduroSat with the support of the European Space Agency (ESA). The constellation focuses on orbital monitoring of the environment, land use, agriculture, forests, coasts, and infrastructure across the Balkans and the EU. In 2023, the Balkan Constellation was selected as one of the Copernicus Contributing Missions (CCMs) providing data to the EU's Copernicus Programme. The first satellite of the constellation, Balkan-1, was launched in January 2025.

Balkan Constellation satellites
Name	COSPAR ID	Satellite bus	Launch date	Launch vehicle	Flight	Ref
Balkan-1	2025-009C	16U CubeSat	14 January 2025	Falcon 9	Transporter-12	
Balkan-2	2026-100H	6U CubeSat	3 May 2026	Falcon 9	CAS500-2 rideshare mission	
Balkan-3	2026-156AL	CubeSat	7 July 2026	Falcon 9	Transporter-17	
