= Sateliot =

Spanish satellite constellation

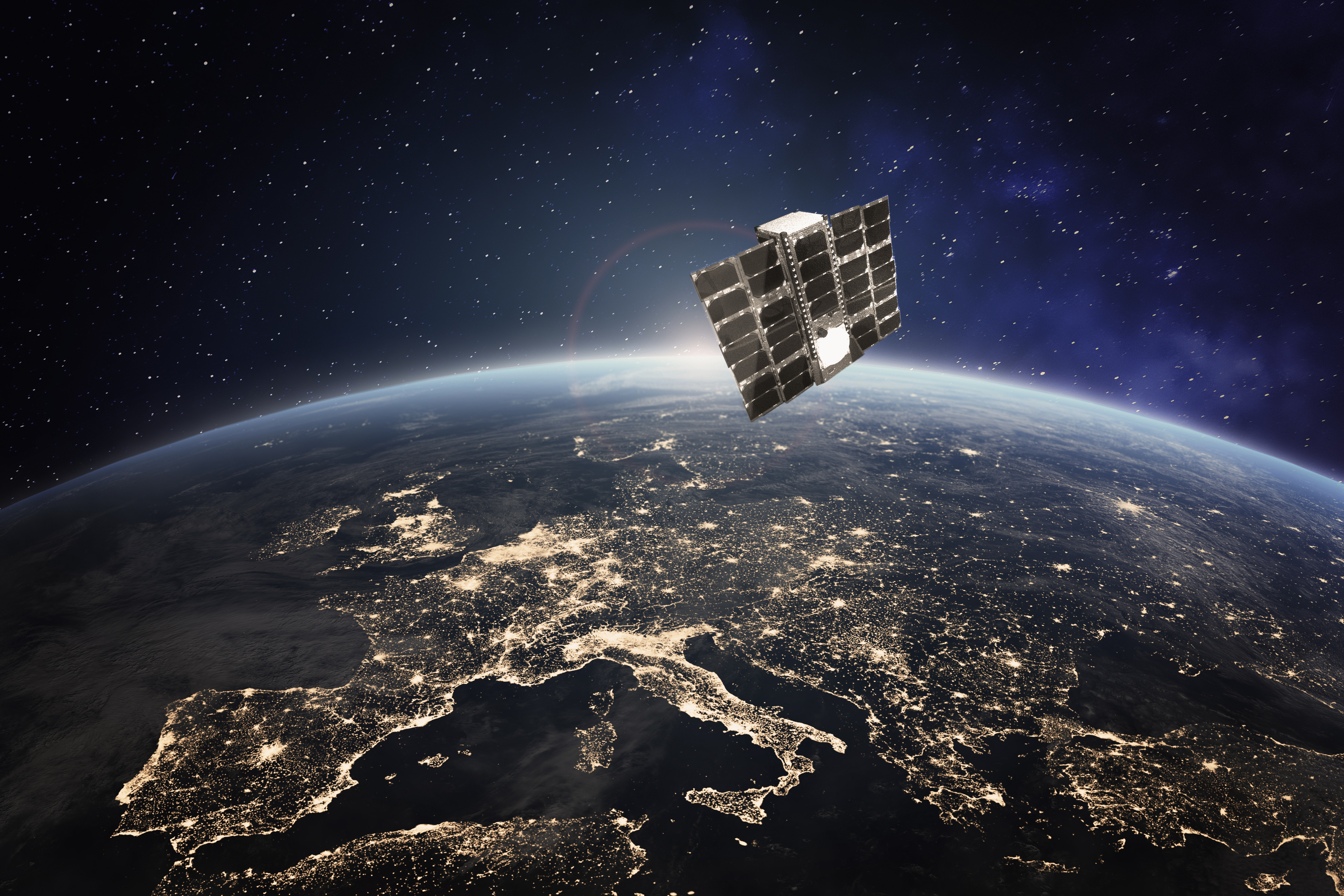
- Satellite Enxaneta
- Country of origin: Spain
- Operator: (Spain) (Catalonia) Sateliot
- Applications: Internet of things
- Website: sateliot.space

Production
- Launched: 11
- Maiden launch: 22 March 2021

Sateliot is a satellite constellation of communication satellites in low Earth orbit developed by the Spanish company Sateliot. Its goal is to provide global narrow-band internet of things connectivity under 5G protocol. The constellation consists of CubeSat-type nanosatellites launched on commercial rideshare missions.

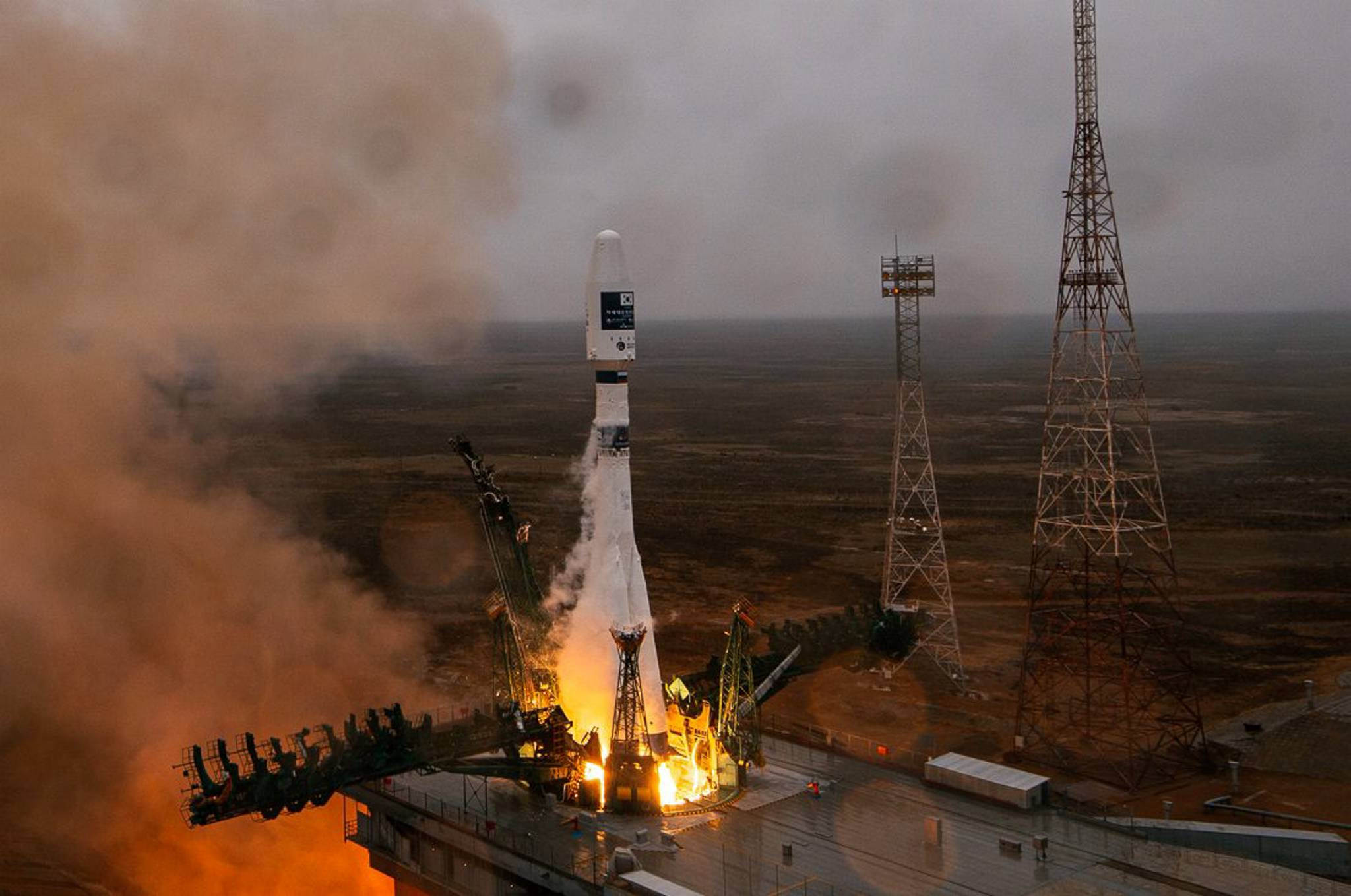
Launch of Enxaneta on Soyuz 2

== Satellites ==
The first test satellite named Enxaneta (or 3B5Gsat), built by Open Cosmos and supported by the Government of Catalonia, was launched in March 2021 aboard Suyuz-2.1a as Catalonia's first nanosatellite. It successfully completed its mission in July 2024. The second satellite named Sateliot_0 GroundBreaker (or Platform-3), built by EnduroSat, was launched in April 2023 aboard Falcon 9's Transporter-7 mission. The first group of multiple operational satellites (Sateliot_1 to Sateliot_4) was launched in August 2024 aboard Falcon 9's Transporter-11 mission.

List of Sateliot satellites
| Name | COSPAR ID | Launch date | Launch vehicle | Ref |
|---|---|---|---|---|
| Enxaneta | 2021-022AF | 22 March 2021 | Soyuz 2 | |
| Sateliot_0 | 2023-054F | 15 April 2023 | Falcon 9 Transporter-7 | |
| Sateliot_1 | 2024-149CL | 16 August 2024 | Falcon 9 Transporter-11 | |
| Sateliot_2 | 2024-149BU | 16 August 2024 | Falcon 9 Transporter-11 | |
| Sateliot_3 | 2024-149CN | 16 August 2024 | Falcon 9 Transporter-11 | |
| Sateliot_4 | 2024-149BX | 16 August 2024 | Falcon 9 Transporter-11 | |
| Sateliot_5 | 2026-227BP | 1 October 2026 | Falcon 9 Transporter-18 | |
| Sateliot_6 | 2026-227C | 1 October 2026 | Falcon 9 Transporter-18 | |
| Sateliot_7 | 2026-227BQ | 1 October 2026 | Falcon 9 Transporter-18 | |
| Sateliot_8 | 2026-227T | 1 October 2026 | Falcon 9 Transporter-18 | |
| Sateliot_9 | 2026-227AR | 1 October 2026 | Falcon 9 Transporter-18 | |

== See also ==
- Catalan Space Agency – Government agency in Catalonia, Spain
