= EnduroSat =

Bulgarian aerospace manufacturer

EnduroSat AD
- Type: Private
- Industry: Aerospace engineering
- Founded: 2015; 11 years ago
- Founder: Raycho Raychev
- Headquarters: Sofia, Bulgaria
- Services: Satellite construction and operation
- Number of employees: 325 (January 2026)
- Website: endurosat.com

EnduroSat AD is a Bulgarian aerospace manufacturer headquartered in Sofia. It was founded in 2015 by Raycho Raychev. The company designs, builds, and operates CubeSats and Nanosatellites for commercial and scientific missions and is developing inter-satellite linking and data applications. EnduroSat was nominated as one of the top 5 small satellite start-ups. EnduroSat is a member of the International Astronautical Federation (IAF) and International Telecommunication Union (ITU).

== Missions ==
Date launched	Mission name	Description	Notes
May 21, 2018	EnduroSat One	First Bulgarian CubeSat mission. The CubeSat was developed within the Space Challenges 2018 program and aimed at raising awareness on the topic of satellite communications and popularizing amateur radio activities. It was embarked on the cargo resupply mission Cygnus CRS-9 to the ISS. It was launched from Wallops Island and was deployed on 13 July 2018 via the ISS' JEM airlock.	
June 30, 2021	SPARTAN	The first Shared Sat mission, it consisted in a 6U CubeSat carrying a total of seven payloads. It was launched on a Falcon 9 Block 5 rocket as part of SpaceX Transporter-2 rideshare mission.	
May 25, 2022	Platform 1 (SharedSat 2141)	Second 6U Shared Sat mission that included an electric propulsion demonstration for Hypernova Space Technologies and the Edge computing payload from IBM. It was launched on a Falcon 9 Block 5 rocket as part of SpaceX Transporter-5 mission.	
January 3, 2023	Platform 2 (SharedSat 2211)	It included a space weather payload from Mission Space and two space propulsion demonstrations, one from Magdrive and one from Hypernova Space Technologies. It was launched on a Falcon 9 Block 5 rocket as part of SpaceX Transporter-6 mission.	
April 15, 2023	Platform 3 (Sateliot_0 Groundbreaker, 2B5GSAT)	6U demonstrator of Sateliot's announced constellation for 5G IoT connectivity in Low Earth orbit. It was launched on a Falcon 9 Block 5 rocket as part of SpaceX Transporter-7 mission.	
April 15, 2023	TAIFA-1	Built on behalf of the Kenyan Space Agency and SayariLabs, it is a 3U cubesat equipped with a hyperspectral Earth observation camera intended to provide disaster prevention and mitigation capabilities. It was launched on a Falcon 9 Block 5 rocket as part of SpaceX Transporter-7 mission.	
November 11, 2023	Platform 5	Shared Sat mission. No details have been released so far about the payloads hosted on this cubesats. It was launched as part of SpaceX Transporter-9 rideshare mission.	
November 11, 2023	OSW Cazorla	3U CubeSats built for Odyssey SpaceWorks, a company specialized in operating satellites that house miniaturized R&D labs. This first satellite hosted two labs: one contained a bioreactor to grow multiple independent cultures of animal muscle tissue built by the Kaplan Lab at Tufts University, and one contained sensors made by Physical Synthesis tested in high stress environments. It was launched as part of SpaceX Transporter-9 rideshare mission.	
November 11, 2023	Barry (B1B2)	12U demonstrator for Rogue Space Systems' constellation of orbital robots for close-up inspection and assistance. This first satellite validates a variety of hardware and software technologies, including Rogue’s Scalable Compute Platform (SCP). It was launched as part of SpaceX Transporter-9 rideshare mission.	
November 11, 2023	PEARL-1C, 1H	Two 6U CubeSats for Foxconn. They serve as demonstrators for their planned LEO broadband communications satellites and their beyond 5G (B5G) capabilities. They were launched on as part of SpaceX Transporter-9 rideshare mission.	
21 December 2026	CTC 0	8U cubesat built for Space Telecommunications Inc. to test direct-to-device connectivity outside of the United States. It was launched as part SpaceX Bandwagon-2 rideshare mission	
14 January 2025	Balkan Constellation	Earth-observation satellites aiming to contribute to the European Copernicus programme.	
15 March 2025	BOTSAT-1	3U cubesat built for the Botswana International University of Science and Technology. The satellite hosts an hyperspectral sensor to gather ground composition data to support mining and agriculture businesses in the country. It was launched as part of the SpaceX Transporter-13 mission.	
23 June 2025	Hubble 6, 7	16U cubesats built for Hubble Network nicknamed Lilo and Stitch. They were launched on 23 June 2025 as paer of the SpaceX Transporter-14 mission and joined an already existing constellation of Hubble cubesats based on the Lemur-2 platform. They are meant to provide connectivity to any Bluetooth-enabled device on the ground, even those without cellular reception.	
3 May 2026	ICARUS 2.0	Five CubeSats for a German initiative tracking animal migrations from space.	
5 September 2026	Platform 6	6U technology demonstration CubeSat launched on Isar Aerospace's second flight of the Spectrum rocket in 2026.	
2027 (planned)	TOLIMAN	16U space telescope	
future	Platform 9	To be launched on the second flight of the RFA One rocket	

== See also ==
- Satellites of Bulgaria
