= Catalan Space Agency =

Government agency in Catalonia, Spain

- Agència Espacial de Catalunya

Agency overview
- Abbreviation: AEC
- Formed: October 27, 2020; 5 years ago
- Type: Space agency
- Jurisdiction: Catalan Government
- Annual budget: US$2.5 millions
- Website: http://politiquesdigitals.gencat.cat/ca/tic/estrategia-new-space-de-catalunya

The Catalan Space Agency (Catalan: Agència Espacial de Catalunya; AEC) is a space agency in Catalonia, an autonomous community of Spain. Founded in 2021, it successfully launched three nanosatellites: Enxaneta on March 22, 2021, Menut on January 3, 2023 and Minairó on April 15, 2023.

== History ==
The program had an initial duration of two years, from 2021 until 2023, and envisages the launch of up to six satellites with a public investment of 21 million dollars (18 million euros) over four years with part of the co-financing from the European Regional Development Fund. The agency is under the authority of the Catalan Ministry of Digital Policies, and was announced as part of the "NewSpace Strategy of Catalonia" on October 27, 2020.

The then Minister of Digital Policies, Jordi Puigneró, explained that this space agency would be responsible for managing the entire government space strategy, and that on October 27th, 2020 it had already launched a bidding process for the first two satellites. The project in which the Institute of Space Studies of Catalonia (IEEC) would collaborate would have a budget of 2.5 million euros. The Catalan government's forecast at the time was that this public investment could create 1,200 jobs in the next 5 years, multiplying by 15 the initial amount invested, reaching approximately 280-300 million euros in these 5 years.

== Technology ==
The intended function of the nanosatellites, both launched and planned, was to increase 5G coverage within Catalonia for the internet of things, conduct terrestrial observation, support the government's own services, and to aid fire control and rescue services in natural preserves and isolated areas. The contracts for design, launch, and subsequent connection of the satellites were granted to private companies. One of the nanosatellites would serve to "complement terrestrial networks and, for example, improve coverage in natural parks to control herds in the high mountains," said the then General Director of Innovation and Digital Economy, Dani Marco, as well as another, would allow "monitoring from space and in real-time major natural disasters such as catastrophic storms like Gloria or to analyze air pollution." These satellites could also be used to check the state of crops, improve weather forecasting, study water reserves in reservoirs and swamps, or observe light pollution and its effects. The chosen models would weigh from one to ten kilograms and could orbit at an altitude of about 2,000 kilometers at a cost ranging from 500,000 euros to 2 million euros. They would be designed and constructed quickly within 6-8 months and have a service life of 4 years.

== See also ==
- Instituto Nacional de Técnica Aeroespacial
- Institut de Ciències de l'Espai
- Sateliot
