= Kleos Space =

Kleos Space S.A.
- Company type: Public
- Traded as: ASX: KSS
- Industry: Data & Analytics, Technology
- Founder: Andy Bowyer, Miles Ashcroft
- Area served: Worldwide
- Key people: Andy Bowyer (CEO)
- Products: Guardian LOCATE
- Services: Geospatial and security intelligence, situational awareness for defense
- Number of employees: 2
- Website: kleos.space

Kleos Space S.A. is a Luxembourg based space-powered Radio Frequency Reconnaissance company that delivers global intelligence and geolocation data as a service. Kleos Space uses its clusters of nanosatellites to detect and locate radio frequency transmissions on land and sea to uncover hidden or illegal activity in key areas. The data collected by the constellation enables up to six antenna pairs to be used in proprietary multilateration algorithms. These algorithms uncover data points of human activity on land and sea for government and commercial use and are delivered to Kleos’ customers, which include various analytics and intelligence entities. Such entities can, for example, detect ships used for unlawful purposes, such as piracy, drug smuggling, and illegal fishing. Their technology can pick up on transmissions independent of other systems, allowing it to provide data when imagery is unclear or targets are out of normal aircraft patrol range.

Kleos’ business model allows for access to the geolocation intelligence data via single user, team, or enterprise licenses, providing Kleos with recurring revenue. Subscribers can purchase additional data from specific areas of interest as Kleos builds out the constellation further. Since customers are licensing to access the data, not to own the data, all intellectual property and historical datasets remain with Kleos.

== History ==
Founded in 2017 by CEO Andy Bowyer and CIO Miles Ashcroft, Kleos is listed on the Australian Securities Exchange (ASX: KSS). In April 2021, the company signed a distribution agreement with the US Government IT solutions provider Carahsoft Technology Corporation. In June 2021, Kleos secured €7.9 million in capital from new and existing investors, including Perennial Value Management and Thorney Investment Group. The finance will allow Kleos to expand its engineering and customer satisfaction teams in Luxembourg, the United Kingdom, and Denver to meet customer needs, and to further scale its offering. As of July 2021, the company reported over 160 prospects in its business pipeline, including defense entities, naval forces, coast guard, border control, and national security agencies from several countries.

Facing financial difficulties, on 3 May 2023 the trading of the company was suspended on the ASX, and on 26 July 2023 the company announced that its main creditor, Pure Asset Management Pty Ltd., was no longer willing to provide cash, and that the company was going to file for bankruptcy. A month later on 28 August 2023 Kleos Space announced the company would not file for bankruptcy until further notice as a result of interest in the company and its assets from multiple parties. As of June 2024, trading remains suspended and no further announcements regarding the future of the company have been made.

== Satellite constellation ==
The Kleos Scouting Mission (KSM1) satellite cluster launched in November 2020 is the world’s first four satellite cluster flown in a formation targeting a precision geolocation capability. The Scouting Mission satellites, launched into a 37-degree inclination, cover key areas of maritime interest, such as the Strait of Hormuz and the South China Sea. The KSM1 cluster is currently being de-orbited due to technical issues experienced in 2022.

Their next cluster of four satellites, the Polar Vigilance Mission (KSF1), launched into a 525 km Sun Synchronous orbit in June 2021 aboard the Spaceflight SXRS-5/SpaceX Transporter-2 Mission. This satellite cluster established Kleos’ coverage to the North and South of its Scouting Mission and broadened its data collection capabilities. In July 2021, Kleos announced it will use these new capabilities to help the Japanese military protect more than 18,480 miles of Japan’s coastline. Under an agreement with Japan Space Imaging Corporation (JSI), Kleos’ RF geolocation data will allow Japanese military and civilian services to identify illicit activities in territorial and international waters.

The third satellite cluster, the Polar Patrol Mission (KSF2) was launched aboard another SpaceX Falcon 9 on 1 April 2022 as part of the Transporter-4 rideshare mission. Designed and developed by nanosatellite specialist Innovative Solutions in Space B.V. (ISISPACE) and launched into a 500-600 km Sun Synchronous orbit, the satellites doubled Kleos’ coverage over both poles. In particular, they increase the coverage of the constellation up to an additional 119 million km² per day, and enables Kleos to increase its average daily revisit rate over a 15-degree latitude area of interest to around five times a day.

A fourth cluster, The Polar Observer Mission (KSF3) was launched on 3 January 2023 on a SpaceX Falcon 9 as part of the Transporter-6 mission. As the previous cluster they will increase the converage of the constellation of an additional 119 million km². The satellites are equipped with VHF & X Band payloads, and for the first time their data will be processed and integrated into Kleos Space's Actional Intelligence LOCATE data products.

Mission	Satellites	COSPAR ID	Launch date	Launch vehicle	Orbit altitude	Inclination	Number deployed	Deorbited
Scouting Mission	KSM1-A to KSM1-D	2020-081	7 November 2020	PSLV-DL	565 km x 570 km	95.9°	4	0
Vigilance Mission	KSF1-A to KSF1-D	2021-059	30 June 2021	Falcon 9 Block 5	480 km x 500 km	97.6°	4	4
Patrol Mission	KSF2-A to KSF2-D	2022-033	1 April 2022	Falcon 9 Block 5	480 km x 495 km	97.4°	4	4
Observer Mission	KSF3-A to KSF3-D	2023-001	3 January 2023	Falcon 9 Block 5	520 km x 540 km	97.5°	4	0
