= Astranis =

American satellite company

Astranis Space Technologies Corp.
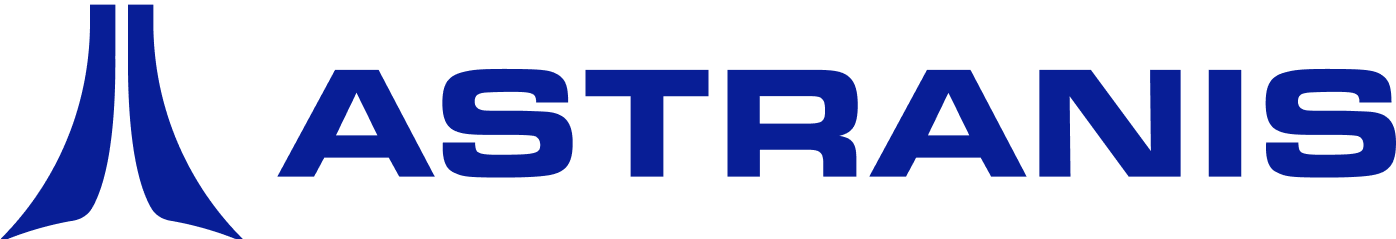

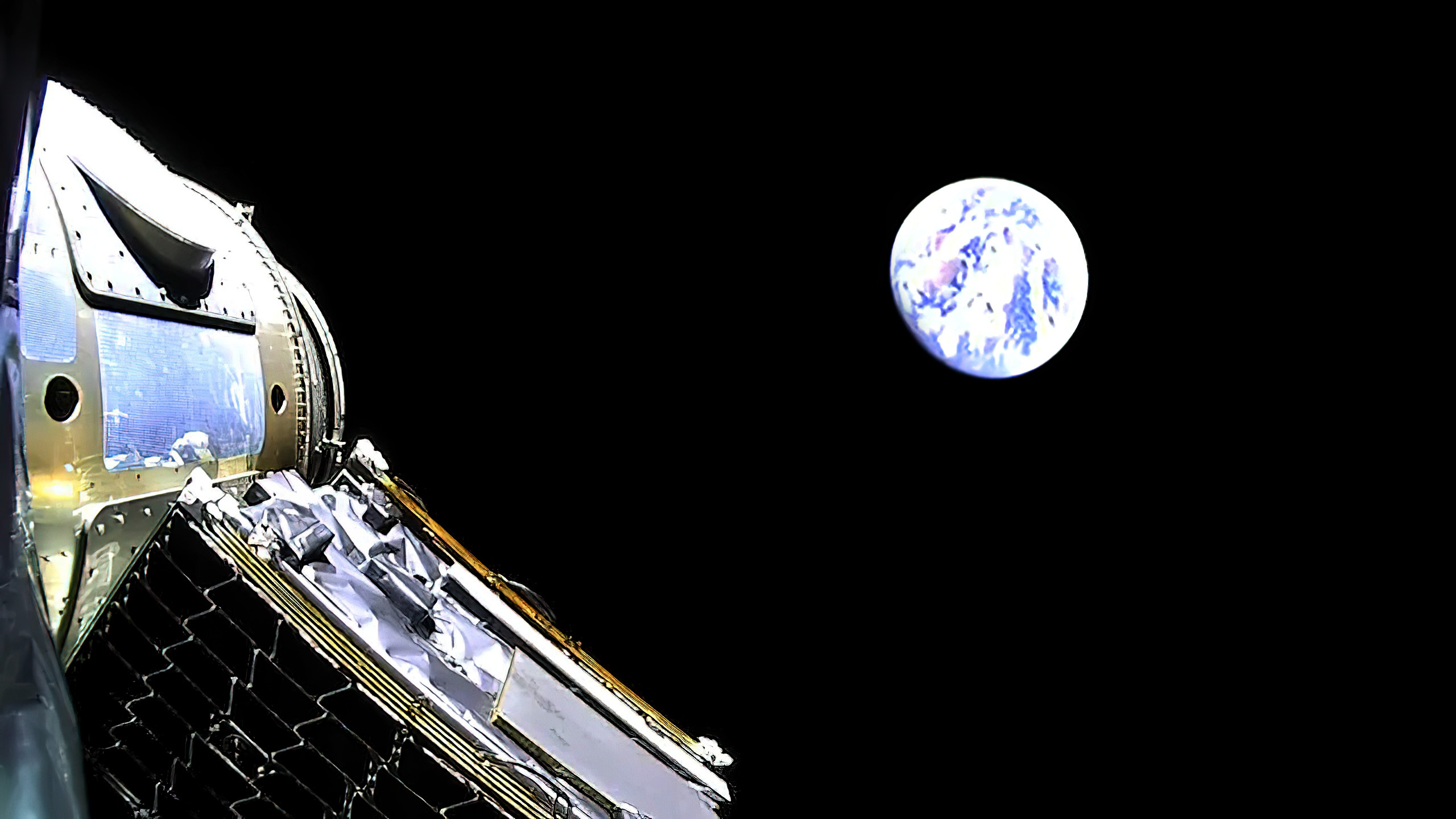
- Trade name: Astranis
- Type: Private
- Industry: Satellite Internet
- Founded: October 20, 2015; 10 years ago
- Founders: John Gedmark; Ryan McLinko
- Headquarters: San Francisco, California, U.S.
- Key people: John Gedmark (CEO); Ryan McLinko (CTO)
- Products: Small geostationary communications satellites
- Number of employees: 250+ (2023)
- Website: www.astranis.com

Astranis Space Technologies Corp. is an American company specializing in geostationary communications satellites. It is headquartered in San Francisco, California.

In 2018, Astranis launched DemoSat-2, a prototype 3U CubeSat. The launch aimed to test software-defined radio (SDR) technology for future larger communications satellites.

The company publicly disclosed its projects in March 2018, following a funding round that was aimed at the development of geostationary communications satellites.

In January 2019, Astranis initiated a commercial program with Pacific Dataport, Inc. to increase the satellite internet capacity in Alaska. A 350 kg satellite was launched on April 30, 2023, as part of a multi-satellite payload.

Astranis was part of the Winter 2016 cohort of the Y Combinator accelerator program and has raised over $350 million in venture funding from firms such as BlackRock, Venrock, and Andreessen Horowitz.

== History ==
=== Demonstration satellite ===
On January 12, 2018, Astranis launched its first satellite, "DemoSat 2", using an Indian PSLV-XL rocket. The satellite was a 3U cubesat measuring 10 cm x 10 cm x 30 cm and weighing less than 3 kg. It carried a prototype of the company's software-defined radio.

=== Geostationary satellites ===
==== Block 1 ====
In 2019, Astranis leased its first MicroGEO spacecraft to Pacific Dataport, Inc., a subsidiary of Microcom. The satellite, named Arcturus, initially had an anticipated launch date in early 2022, which was later delayed to April 2023. After the launch, the company confirmed successful communication with the satellite and hardware deployment. Subsequent tests showed the spacecraft could deliver up to 8.5 Gbit/s, compared to its design specification of 7.5 Gbit/s.

In July 2023, Astranis reported a malfunction in an externally supplied solar array drive assembly on Arcturus, which affected the spacecraft's ability to provide internet service. According to Astranis CEO John Gedmark, no hardware built by Astranis failed.

==== Block 2 ====
In April 2022, Astranis signed a launch contract with SpaceX for their "Block 2" MicroGEO spacecraft. The company had previously initiated component orders for these spacecraft, with an initial aim to complete them by the end of 2022. The four satellites launched on 29 December 2024.

==== Block 3 ====
Block 3, consisting of five satellites, was originally planned to launch in mid-2024 but is now scheduled for 2025. Customers include Orbits Corp of the Philippines, Thaicom of Thailand, Orbith of Argentina, and Apco Networks of Mexico.

==== Future ====
A replacement for Arcturus is scheduled for early 2025. Astranis CEO John Gedmark stated in April 2022 that the company aims to have over 100 satellites in active service by 2030.

== Spacecraft ==
Launch	Number	Spacecraft	Longitude	Customer	Status
12 January 2018, PSLV-XL	—	DemoSat-2	LEO	Astranis	Success
12 January 2018, PSLV-XL	—	5 kg CubeSat carrying prototype software-defined radio payload.			
1 May 2023, Falcon Heavy	1	Arcturus / Aurora 4A	163°W	~~(United States) (Alaska) Pacific Dataport~~	Out of service
1 May 2023, Falcon Heavy	1	First MicroGEO spacecraft, customer designation Aurora 4A. Launched aboard a SpaceX Falcon Heavy in April 2023, co-manifested with primary payload Viasat-3 Americas and Gravity Space GS-1. A defect in the spacecraft's solar array drive assemblies in early July 2023 left the spacecraft with insufficient power for its primary mission. Spacecraft remains functional, with Astranis attempting to recover the spacecraft's solar arrays or repurpose it for secondary missions.			
29 December 2024, Falcon 9	2–5	Agila		(Philippines) Orbits Corp	Success
29 December 2024, Falcon 9	2–5	NuView Alpha		(United States) Anuvu	Success
29 December 2024, Falcon 9	2–5	NuView Beta		(United States) Anuvu	Success
29 December 2024, Falcon 9	2–5	UtilitySat-1		(United States) Pacific Dataport	Success
29 December 2024, Falcon 9	2–5	"Block 2" MicroGEO spacecraft, with upgraded lifetime and throughput performance. Four spacecraft will be launched by a dedicated Falcon 9 mission directly to geostationary orbit. Manifested are: Agila, a broadband satellite ordered by the Philippine company Orbits Corp and replacing the initially planned Andesat satellite which suffered delays.; Two of eight spacecraft ordered by Anuvu (formerly Global Eagle) for maritime and aviation connectivity.; UtilitySat-1, a versatile on-orbit spare planned to replace the failed Arcturus spacecraft until a dedicated replacement can be launched.			
2025	6-10				
2025	6-10	Apco-1		(Mexico) Apco Networks	Under construction
2025	6-10	Apco-2		(Mexico) Apco Networks	Under construction
2025	6-10	unknown		(Argentina) Orbith	Under construction
2025	6-10			(Philippines) Orbits Corp	Under construction
2025	6-10	Thaicom-9		(Thailand) Thaicom	Under construction
2025	6-10	"Block 3" MicroGEO spacecraft. Manifested are: Two spacecraft ordered by Apco Networks for service to Mexico.; One spacecraft ordered by Orbits Corp for service to the Philippines, capacity itself contracted to telecom provider HTechCorp.; One spacecraft ordered by Thaicom for service to Thailand			
