= Kwangmyŏngsŏng program =

North Korean satellite program

- Hangul: 광명성
- Hanja: 光明星
- RR: Gwangmyeongseong
- MR: Kwangmyŏngsŏng
- IPA: [kwaŋ.mjʌŋ.sʌŋ]

The Kwangmyŏngsŏng program was a class of experimental satellites developed by North Korea. The name Kwangmyŏngsŏng ("bright star", "brilliant star" or "constellation" in Korean) is from a poem written by Kim Il Sung. The first class of satellites built by North Korea, the program started in the mid-1980s. There have been five launches so far, of which two have been successful.

== Background ==
According to North Korea Academy of Science's Academician Kwon Tong-hwa, the SLV was developed in the 1980s when late leader Kim Il Sung announced the decision to launch a North Korean satellite.

The decision to send a North Korean satellite was precipitated by the successful launching of South Korea's first satellite, Uribyol-1, on 10 August 1992 and its second satellite, Uribyol 2, on 26 September 1993, both by a European Ariane 4 SLV. In a late-1993 meeting of the Korean Workers' Party Central Committee, Kim Il Sung expressed his desire to quickly place a satellite into orbit, leading to the expansion of North Korea's nascent space program and the requirement for a space launch vehicle.

== Launch attempts ==
=== First orbital launch attempt ===
On 4 September 1998, the official Korean Central News Agency announced that a satellite called Kwangmyŏngsŏng-1 had been launched at 3:07 UTC on 31 August from a launch site in Musudan-ri, Hwadae-gun, North Hamgyong Province by a Paektusan-1 satellite launch vehicle (SLV). No objects were ever tracked in orbit from the launch, and outside North Korea it is considered to have been a failure.

United States Space Command reported that the satellite failed to reach orbit, and burned up in the atmosphere. The failure is believed to have occurred during the third stage burn.

North Korea's leader Kim Jong Il revealed that the country had spent approximately 200–300 million dollars for the satellite project during a summit with then-South Korean president Kim Dae-Jung in 2000.

=== Second orbital launch attempt ===
Kwangmyŏngsŏng-2 was a satellite launched by North Korea on 5 April 2009. According to the North Korean government, an Unha-2 rocket carrying the satellite was launched on Sunday 5 April 2009 at 11:20 local time (02:20 UTC) from the Tonghae Satellite Launching Ground at Musudan-ri in northeastern North Korea. However, officials in South Korea and the United States reported that the rocket and any payload had fallen into the Pacific Ocean. The Russian Space Control concurred, stating that the satellite "simply is not there".

Prior to the launch, concern was raised by other nations, particularly the United States, South Korea and Japan, that the launch might be a trial run of technology that could be used in the future to launch an intercontinental ballistic missile. The launch of the rocket was sharply condemned by the United States and the European Union, while the People's Republic of China and Russia urged restraint.

=== Third launch attempt ===
Kwangmyŏngsŏng-3 was a polar-orbiting earth observation satellite that North Korea tried to launch 13 April 2012 from the Sohae Satellite Launching Station at Cholsan County in northwestern North Korea. The satellite was to be lifted by a Unha-3 carrier rocket. The satellite launch was timed to coincide with the centenary of Kim Il Sung's birth. The rocket broke up a minute after its launch and the remains fell into the ocean.

=== Fourth launch attempt ===
On 1 December 2012, the Korean Central News Agency said that the Korean Committee for Space Technology announced that it would launch a second version of Kwangmyongsong-3 to be lifted by a Unha-3 carrier rocket at the Sohae Satellite Launching Station on a launch period between 10 and 22 December 2012.

The launch was carried out on 12 December 2012, at 09:50 local time (00:50 UTC) and the satellite entered polar orbit, as confirmed by monitoring agencies in South Korea and North America with NORAD #39026 and International designator 2012-072A.

=== Fifth launch attempt ===
Kwangmyongsong-4 or KMS-4 is an Earth observation satellite launched by North Korea on 7 February 2016.

On 7 February 2016, roughly a month after an alleged hydrogen bomb test, North Korea claimed to have put a satellite into orbit around the Earth. Japanese Prime Minister Shinzō Abe had warned the North to not launch the rocket, and if it did and the rocket violated Japanese territory, it would be shot down. Nevertheless, North Korea launched the rocket anyway, claiming the satellite was purely intended for peaceful, scientific purposes. Several nations, including the United States, Japan, and South Korea, have criticized the launch, and despite North Korean claims that the rocket was for peaceful purposes, it has been heavily criticized as an attempt to perform an ICBM test under the disguise of a peaceful satellite launch. China also criticized the launch; however it urged "the relevant parties" to "refrain from taking actions that may further escalate tensions on the Korean peninsula".

=== Planned sixth launch attempt ===
There are plans to a sixth launch attempt of a Kwangmyŏngsŏng program satellite, called Kwangmyŏngsŏng-5. In late December 2017, it was reported that Kwangmyŏngsŏng-5 had completed and could be launched on a mobile launch platform. The satellite was reported to be equipped with cameras and telecommunication devices, as well as the capability of transmitting data back to Earth.

So far, the Kwangmyŏngsŏng-5 has not been launched.

== In popular culture ==
The Kwangmyŏngsŏng-1 satellite has since featured prominently in North Korean festivities and celebrations such as the mass games. Commemorative stamps showing the real shape of the satellite still attached to the spin up solid motor orbital insertion third stage and more than two orbits have also been printed on several occasions.

== See also ==
- Dong Fang Hong I
- Iranian Space Agency
- Korean Committee of Space Technology
- Musudan-ri
- Sohae Satellite Launching Station
