= Shota =

Shota may refer to:

- Shota (dance), a traditional dance from Kosovo
- Shota (vehicle), Albanian mine-resistant ambush-protected vehicle
- Shota (Georgian given name), a Georgian given name
- Shōta, a Japanese given name
- Shota (wrestler), Japanese professional wrestler
- Shota, a childlike male character in shotacon media
- Shota the Witch Woman, a character from Terry Goodkind's fantasy series The Sword of Truth

== See also ==
- Sota (disambiguation)
- Shoto (disambiguation)
