= Shoto =

Shoto or Shōtō may refer to:

== Places ==
- Shoto-ko, a former name of Songdo Point in North Korea
- Shōtō, Shibuya, a residential district of Tokyo, Japan

== People ==
- Shōtō-in (松東院; 1571?–1656), an early Christian in Japan
- Shoto Suzuki (鈴木 翔登; born 1992), Japanese footballer

== Fictional characters ==
- Shoto Todoroki, a character in the Japanese superhero manga series My Hero Academia
- Gogo Shoto, a character in the animated superhero film Batman Unlimited: Monster Mayhem
- Isaya Shoto, a character in the manga and anime series Vampire Knight
- Akilhide Karatsu, a character in Ready Player One whose OASIS persona is Shoto
- the "Shoto" archetype characters in Street Fighter video games
  - Ryu (Street Fighter)
  - Ken Masters
  - Akuma (Street Fighter)

== Other ==
- Shoto (sword), a Japanese sword

== See also ==
- Shotokan, a style of karate
- Shota (disambiguation)
