= Yongdae Gap =

Yongdae Gap Lighthouse
- Location: Yongdae Gap; South Hamgyong Province; North Korea
- Coordinates: 40°28′24.8″N 129°3′44.2″E

Tower
- Shape: cylindrical tower with balcony and lantern
- Markings: white tower

Light
- Focal height: 61 meters (200 ft)
- Range: 12 nautical miles (22 km; 14 mi)
- Characteristic: L Fl W 9s.

Yongdae Gap (Korean: 용대갑; Hanja: 龍台岬; "Dragon-Terrace Cape") is a North Korean headland in the middle of the country's eastern coast along the Sea of Japan. It forms the southeastern corner of South Hamgyong's Tanchon and the western point of a narrow bay sheltering Songjin and Hwadae.

== Names ==
In the 19th century, Yongdae Gap was known as Cape Schlippenbach or Schlippenback. During the Japanese occupation of Korea, it was known as Ryūdai-kō.

== Geography ==
Yongdae Gap is the southern point of a small peninsula whose most conspicuous summit is Wonsandok San, which rises to an elevation of 504 meters (1,654 ft) about 4 miles (6.4 km) due north of the cape. The highest visible mountain from the point is Yongyon San(용연-산, 龍淵山), which rises to an elevation of 1,598 meters (5,243 ft) about 17 miles (27 km) farther NNW. Its range extends 25 miles (40 km) north from the cape.

A half-mile (.8 km) to the west of the peninsula is Yongdae Myoji ("Yongdae Anchorage"). This has a depth of 9.1–13 meters (30–43 ft) and bottom in fine sand, but is unsafe except as a shelter from NE winds.

To the east of Yongdae Gap is a narrow but long and deep bay extending about 40 miles (64 km) east to Musu Point.

== Lighthouse ==
Yongdae Gap has a lighthouse, but it is closed to the public and the American National Geospatial-Intelligence Agency notes that "the existence and operation of all navigational aids should be considered unreliable on the east coast of North Korea".

== See also ==
- Yongdae, its namesake village
- List of lighthouses in North Korea
