= Shota (ensemble) =

Albanian Ensemble

Shota Ensamble
- National Ensemble of Songs and Dances "Shota"; Albanian: Ansambli Kombëtar i Këngëve dhe Valleve "Shota"
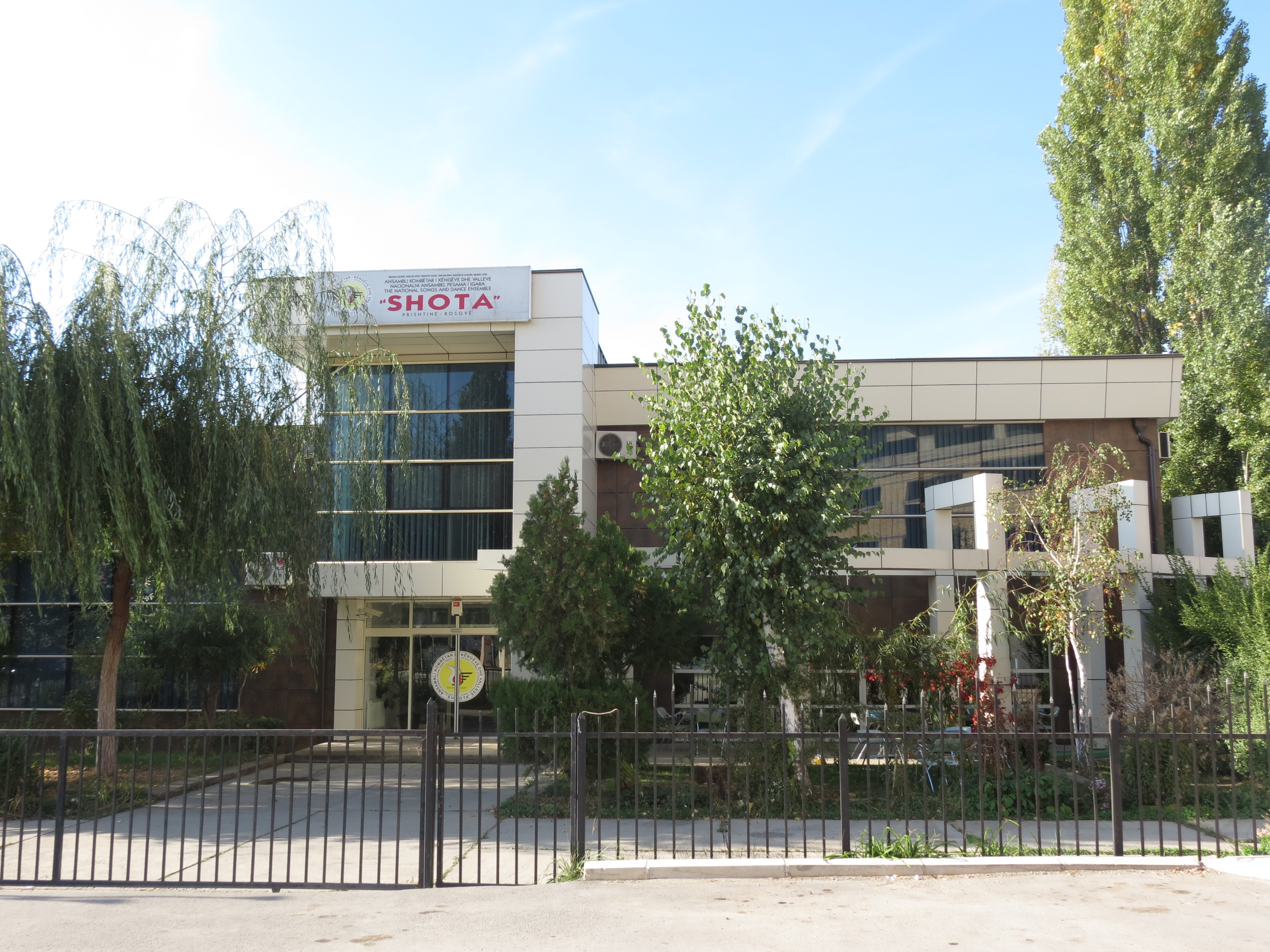
- The headquarters of the "Shota" Ensemble.
- Abbreviation: AKKV "Shota"
- Formation: 1948; 78 years ago
- Location: Pristina, Kosovo

The National Ensemble of Songs and Dances "Shota", commonly known as the "Shota" Ensemble, based in Pristina, is a representative of the Albanian folklore on the international folklore stage.

The "Shota" Ensemble is one of the most well-known and oldest folklore ensembles in Kosovo. Founded in 1948 in Pristina, initially as a cultural-artistic society, "Shota" gained the status of a professional ensemble from the Assembly of Kosovo in 1964. This ensemble has played an important role in promoting and preserving the Albanian culture and traditions through music, dances, and traditional costumes.

== History ==
The "Shota" Ensemble was founded in the post-World War II period, in 1948, at a time when the Albanian cultural identity in Kosovo was striving to reaffirm itself. The name "Shota" was chosen in honor of the national heroine Shote Galica, a prominent fighter for the Albanian cause in the early 20th century.

== Repertoire ==
The repertoire of the "Shota" Ensemble includes a wide range of traditional Albanian music and dances from all regions of Kosovo and beyond. They perform traditional songs, folk melodies, and dances that reflect the customs and traditions of the Albanian people. Their songs and dances are often accompanied by traditional instruments such as the çiftelia, lahuta, dajre, and fyelli.

== International shows ==
The "Shota" Ensemble has performed in many countries around the world, including Czechoslovakia (1965), Switzerland, France, Belgium (1966), the Netherlands, Luxembourg, Turkey (1967), East Germany, the USSR (1970, 1974), Albania (1973), Germany, Italy (1980), and the United States (1987). Even in the 1990s, the ensemble operated within the institutions of Kosovo, performing in Turkey, Switzerland, France, Montenegro, Kosovo, and Presevo.

== Awards ==
Some of the most significant awards include fourth place in Tunisia (1969), second place in Dijon, France (1986), third place in Seoul, South Korea, second place in Buyukçekmece, Turkey, first place in Bursa, Turkey, first place in Sicily, and first place in Bulgaria (2014). In total, the "Shota" Ensemble has performed around 7,000 stage presentations.

== See also ==
- Culture of Albania
- Shota (dance)
