= Songdo (disambiguation) =

Songdo (Korean: 송도, alternatively from 松都, "Pine City", or 松島, "Pine Island(s)"), may refer to:

- Kaesong, North Korea
- Songdo Point, North Korea
- Songdo International Business District, a district in Incheon, South Korea
- Songdo Beach in Busan, South Korea
