= List of lighthouses in North Korea =

This is a list of lighthouses in North Korea.

== Lighthouses ==
Name	Image	Year built	Location & coordinates	Class of light	Focal height	NGA number	Admiralty number	Range nml
Ansong Gap Lighthouse		n/a	South Hamgyong Province; 39°53′28.3″N 127°52′32.4″E	L Fl W 7s.	87 metres (285 ft)	16308.5	M4506.5	13
Apryong Dan Lighthouse		n/a	Kangwon Province; 39°07′54.3″N 127°44′42.2″E	Fl W 10s.	n/a	16352	M4473	8
Chamae Do Lighthouse		1917	South Hwanghae Province; 38°40′46.8″N 124°58′37.1″E	Fl W 18s.	42 metres (138 ft)	18116	M4118	17
Ch'an Do Lighthouse		n/a	South Hwanghae Province; 38°41′01.5″N 125°06′55.5″E	Fl W 15s.	44 metres (144 ft)	18124	M4120	10
Chang Dok Do Lighthouse	Image	2009 rebuilt	Wonsan; 39°10′30.3″N 127°26′30.7″E	Fl W 5s.	25 metres (82 ft)	16340	M4480	5
Changadae Dan Lighthouse		n/a	Kangwon Province; 38°45′13.6″N 128°15′54.9″E	Fl (2) W 18s.	75 metres (246 ft)	16359	M4462	18
Changjon Man Lighthouse		n/a	Kangwon Province; 38°44′40.2″N 128°12′11.5″E	Iso W 7s.	82 metres (269 ft)	16360	M4464	18
Chiri Do Lighthouse		n/a	Nampo; 38°42′08.6″N 125°08′24.4″E	Fl W 12s.	20 metres (66 ft)	18128	M4122	10
Chongsok Dan Lighthouse		n/a	Kangwon Province; 38°57′55.3″N 127°54′30.3″E	Fl (2) W 30s.	39 metres (128 ft)	16352	M4468	18
Dong Hang Breakwater Lighthouse		n/a	Chongjin; 41°46′35.2″N 129°49′14.2″E	F G	14 metres (46 ft)	16260	M4542	8
Huibong Gang Lighthouse		n/a	South Hwanghae Province; 38°30′23.5″N 124°53′43.7″E	Fl W 3s.	36 metres (118 ft)	18118.5	M4116.5	10
Hungnam Breakwater Lighthouse		n/a	South Hamgyong Province; 39°49′25.2″N 127°37′54.7″E	F R	12 metres (39 ft)	16316	M4492	2
Ijin Man Lighthouse		1916	North Hamgyong Province; 42°04′41.1″N 130°07′36.4″E	Fl (2) W 6s.	18 metres (59 ft)	16248	M4556	12
Komalsan Dan Lighthouse		1910	Chongjin; 41°45′45.2″N 129°50′50.8″E	L Fl W 6s.	59 metres (194 ft)	16252	M4540	20
Kuro Iso Lighthouse		n/a	South Hwanghae Province; 38°35′43.0″N 124°57′25.3″E	Fl W 9s.	8 metres (26 ft)	18118	M4117.5	5
Kwak Tan Lighthouse		n/a	Rajin-guyok; 42°15′04.0″N 130°24′08.2″E	Fl W 12s.	61 metres (200 ft)	16228	M4568	13
Kwangsunggotchi Lighthouse		n/a	South Hamgyong Province; 39°31′45.4″N 127°31′20.6″E	L Fl W 9s.	46 metres (151 ft)	16223	M4490	8
Maan Do Lighthouse		n/a	North Hamgyong Province; 39°48′16.5″N 124°11′14.0″E	Fl W 5s.	72 metres (236 ft)	18176	M4100	10
Maritime Border Range Rear Lighthouse		n/a	Rason; 42°20′07.3″N 130°38′33.9″E	F W	79 metres (259 ft)	16198.1	M7420.01	19
Mayang Do Lighthouse		1913	South Hamgyong Province; 39°59′43.1″N 128°13′27.3″E	Fl (4) W 22s.	68 metres (223 ft)	16308	M4510	16
Monggumpo Lighthouse		n/a	South Hwanghae Province; 38°11′16.7″N 124°47′07.6″E	Fl (2) W 30s.	43 metres (141 ft)	18105	n/a	20
Munbakdo Lighthouse		n/a	North Pyongan Province; 39°49′30.5″N 124°20′26.2″E	Fl W 3s.	n/a	18166	M4106	6
Musu Dan Lighthouse		1911	Musu Dan; 40°50′03.8″N 129°42′50.3″E	Fl (2) W 15s.	81 metres (266 ft)	16280	M4530	23
Nan Do Lighthouse		1915	Rason; 42°13′51.6″N 130°31′42.5″E	Fl W 5s.	39 metres (128 ft)	16200	M4570	17
Nap To Lighthouse		n/a	North Pyongan Province; 36°16′10.8″N 124°43′05.4″E	Fl W 5s.	n/a	18152	M4113	10
Ogaram Sam Lighthouse		n/a	Rason; 42°16′30.8″N 130°38′10.1″E	F G	55 metres (180 ft)	16204	M4590	8
Orang Dan Lighthouse		n/a	Orang County; 41°22′53.0″N 129°48′19.6″E	Iso W 4s.	42 metres (138 ft)	16272	M4534	15
Orip'o-ri Lighthouse		n/a	Nampo; 38°39′32.5″N 125°13′22.8″E	F W	36 metres (118 ft)	18136	M4128	5
Oryuji Gi Lighthouse		n/a	South Hwanghae Province; 38°20′44.9″N 124°51′23.7″E	Fl W 15s.	~ 30 metres (98 ft)	18106	n/a	15
Pibalto Lighthouse		1909	Nampo; 38°43′23.5″N 125°24′29.0″E	Fl W 9s.	26 metres (85 ft)	18148	M4132	4
P'i Do Lighthouse	Image	~1896	South Hwanghae Province; 38°40′50.2″N 125°10′32.4″E	Fl (2) W 30s.	86 metres (282 ft)	18132	M4126	25
Ryanghwa Lighthouse		n/a	North Hamgyong Province; 41°12′20.8″N 129°43′53.9″E	Fl W 3s.	48 metres (157 ft)	16278	M4532	18
Sampo Lighthouse		n/a	North Hamgyong Province; 39°55′42.0″N 124°21′17.5″E	Iso W 6s.	62 metres (203 ft)	18168	M4107	12
So Do Lighthouse		1908	South Hwanghae Province; 38°33′00.7″N 124°45′48.9″E	Fl W 20s.	106 metres (348 ft)	18112	M4116	15
So Hang Breakwater Lighthouse		n/a	Chongjin; 41°44′53.5″N 129°46′05.8″E	F G	12 metres (39 ft)	16268	M4546	5
Sohojin Lighthouse		1911	South Hamgyong Province; 39°48′21.9″N 127°39′46.4″E	Fl (2) W 30s.	47 metres (154 ft)	16312	M4506	18
Sokkun Som Lighthouse		1919 est.	Kangwon Province; 39°17′13.3″N 127°33′52.9″E	Fl W 7s.	25 metres (82 ft)	16324	M4488	9
Sol Som Lighthouse		n/a	Kangwon Province; 38°51′35.3″N 128°04′31.2″E	L Fl W 25s.	66 metres (217 ft)	16358	M4465	16
Song Do Gap Lighthouse		n/a	Songdo Point; 40°01′51.4″N 128°19′41.3″E	L Fl W 7s.	59 metres (194 ft)	16306	M4510.4	12
Songjin Peninsula Lighthouse		n/a	Kimchaek; 40°39′39.0″N 129°12′39.6″E	Iso W 6s.	52 metres (171 ft)	16284	M4516	20
Songmun Am Lighthouse		n/a	South Hwanghae Province; 38°30′42.6″N 124°54′16.7″E	Fl W 10s.	~ 9 metres (30 ft)	18119	M4117	5
Suun Do Lighthouse		1909	North Pyongan Province; 39°41′22.2″N 124°24′34.6″E	Fl W 10s.	48 metres (157 ft)	18160	M4104	20
Suwon Dan Lighthouse		n/a	Kangwon Province; 38°41′07.8″N 128°21′38.3″E	Fl (2) W 15s.	41 metres (135 ft)	16364	M4461	17
Taecho-Do Lighthouse		1935	Rason; 42°08′57.1″N 130°16′38.8″E	Fl (3) W 25s.	120 metres (390 ft)	16232	M4558	27
Taegamdo Lighthouse		n/a	North Pyongan Province; 39°28′42.0″N 125°06′54.0″E (NGA)	Fl W 12s.	n/a	18149	M4112.5	6
Taehwa Do Lighthouse		1909	North Pyongan Province; 39°26′19.9″N 124°36′28.4″E	F W	95 metres (312 ft)	18156	M4112	20
Toku Somu Lighthouse		n/a	Nampo; 38°44′56.7″N 124°58′06.6″E	Fl W 15s.	92 metres (302 ft)	18120	M4119	10
Un Do Lighthouse		n/a	North Pyongan Province; 39°43′52.2″N 124°24′05.0″E	Fl (2) W 6s.	25 metres (82 ft)	18164	M4105	13
Unmandae Dan Lighthouse		n/a	North Hamgyong Province; 40°56′33.8″N 129°45′47.8″E	Fl W 14s.	119 metres (390 ft)	16277	M4531	10
Yo Do Lighthouse		1906	Kangwon Province; 39°13′28.2″N 127°38′10.3″E	Oc W 20s.	67 metres (220 ft)	16332	M4472	20
Yongdae Gap Lighthouse		n/a	Yongdae Gap; 40°28′24.7″N 129°03′44.2″E	L Fl W 9s.	61 metres (200 ft)	16301	M4514	12
Yongjin Lighthouse		n/a	Kangwon Province; 39°17′57.4″N 127°24′08.7″E	L Fl W 12s.	65 metres (213 ft)	16326	M4485	8
Yubun Do Lighthouse		n/a	Kangwon Province; 39°17′27.2″N 127°31′37.4″E	L Fl W 6s.	37 metres (121 ft)	16325	M4487	4

== See also ==
- Lists of lighthouses and lightvessels
