= De la Sota =

De la Sota is a Spanish surname. Notable people with the surname include:

- Alejandro de la Sota, several people
- Imanol de la Sota (born 1975), Spanish football manager
- José Manuel de la Sota (1949–2018), Argentine politician
- Manuel de la Sota (1897–1979), Basque writer
- Natalia de la Sota (born 1975), Argentine politician
- Ramon de la Sota (1857–1936), Basque lawyer and industrialist

== See also ==
- Calle Daniel de la Sota
- Sota (surname)
