= Sota =

Sota, Soota, Souta or SOTA may refer to:

== Arts and entertainment ==
- Šota, an Albanian and Kosovar dance
- Sota (EP), a 1999 EP by Horna
- Sota (playing card), the equivalent of the Jack or Knave in Spanish-suited playing cards
- Summits On The Air, an awards program for radio amateurs operating from mountainous locations

== Organizations ==
- School of the Arts (Rochester, New York), US
- San Francisco School of the Arts, US
- School of the Arts, Singapore
- Sota.Vision (SOTA), Russian independent news outlet
- Tacoma School of the Arts, Washington, US

== Places ==
- Minnesota (nickname Sota), a US state
- Sota, South Papua, a town in Indonesia

== People ==
- Sota (given name)
- Sota (surname)
- Sota (footballer) (born 1987), Spanish footballer
- Šóta (1774–1864), Sioux head chief

== Other uses ==
- State of the art, the highest level of something at a particular time
- School of the Air, correspondence schools in Australia originally using pedal radios
- Software over-the-air or over-the-air update

== See also ==
- Shota (disambiguation)
