= Sinpung-dong Ballistic Missile Operating Base =

Military installation in North Korea

- North Korea

Site information
- Type: Military base

Location
- Coordinates: 40.316252°N 125.276505°E

Site history
- Built: 2004–present

The Sinpung-dong Ballistic Missile Operating Base (Korean: 신풍동) is the attributed name of an undeclared missile launch site situated in Taegwan County, North Pyongan Province, North Korea in the northeastern portion of the city of Taegwan, 27 kilometers from the China–North Korea border.

Active based on satellite imagery since 2004, and operational since 2014, the sight saw significant expansion and activity from 2024 onwards, bringing up new concerns about the expansion of the Hwasong missile program and North Korea nuclear program.

== Location ==
The base, an undeclared installation, is situated near the village of Sinpung-dong, 12 km northeast of the town of Taegwan (대관읍), 27 km from the Chinese border, therefore 146 km NNW of Pyongyang and 340 km NW of Seoul. It is part of a series of military installations along the northern parts of country, known as the "strategic belt" which also includes sites like the Tonghae Satellite Launching Ground and the Sohae Satellite Launching Station.

Designed to be hidden, it is situated in a narrow mountain valley along the south slope of Pugo Mountain (부거산), and encompasses 22 square km of space, the size of John F. Kennedy International Airport.

Nearby facilities allegedly involved in missile production includes the Taegwan Factory Plant No. 301.

The nearest Korean People's Army Air Force airbase is in Panghyon, which operates MiG-17 and MiG-19 aircraft.

== History ==
Satellite imagery suggests that the base was first established in 2004, but gained operational status in 2014. Prior to that from 1984 to 1996, it was largely an empty space set aside for logging and small agricultural spaces.

From 2005 to 2006, two checkpoints were established at Sinpung-dong at the foot of the valley. The first checkpoint is situated 4.8 km northeast from the mouth of the valley, where housing for senior officers (86 lodgings), motor vehicles, storage and 16 greenhouses were established, and another is situated in a valley branch. It is estimated that the warehouses and storage were constructed around 2006–2011, while the residences were built in 2014–2017.

The headquarters and administration is located 1.7 km up from the main valley was built around 2004–2007, in addition to barracks, motor vehicle storage and a plaza, with a cultural education hall built 2018–2019.

With the Pugo Mountain Valley branching into four sub-valleys, two of the sub-valleys were converted into missile checkout facilities, consisting of concrete storage spaces cut into the mountains estimated 35 meters by 17 meters. Further vegetation growth conceals the precise details of the facility layout.

Two underground facilities, one at the northern portion of the main valley, and the fourth branch, are situated 20–40 meters above the valley bottom to avoid seasonal flooding; it is believed to be constructed between 2006 and 2014. It is estimated that the facility could hold 6-9 of North Korea's ICBMs, including the Hwasong-15 and the Hwasong-18, as well as a possible unknown model, though observers note that the facility may primarily accommodate liquid propellant models and IRBMs versus ICBMs.

The facility's layout, photographed by satellite imagery on 11 July 2025, was released in a report by the Center for Strategic and International Studies on 20 August 2025, in conjunction with a report by The Wall Street Journal after an announcement by Kim Jong Un to rapidly expand nuclear armament on 19 August 2025 in response to the joint-US/ROK exercise Ulchi-Freedom Shield.

It is not believed that the Sinpung-dong base was not subjected to any denuclearization talks held between the U.S. and North Korea. Such undisclosed facilities is estimated to number between 15 and 20 sites.
