= Wonsan general strike =

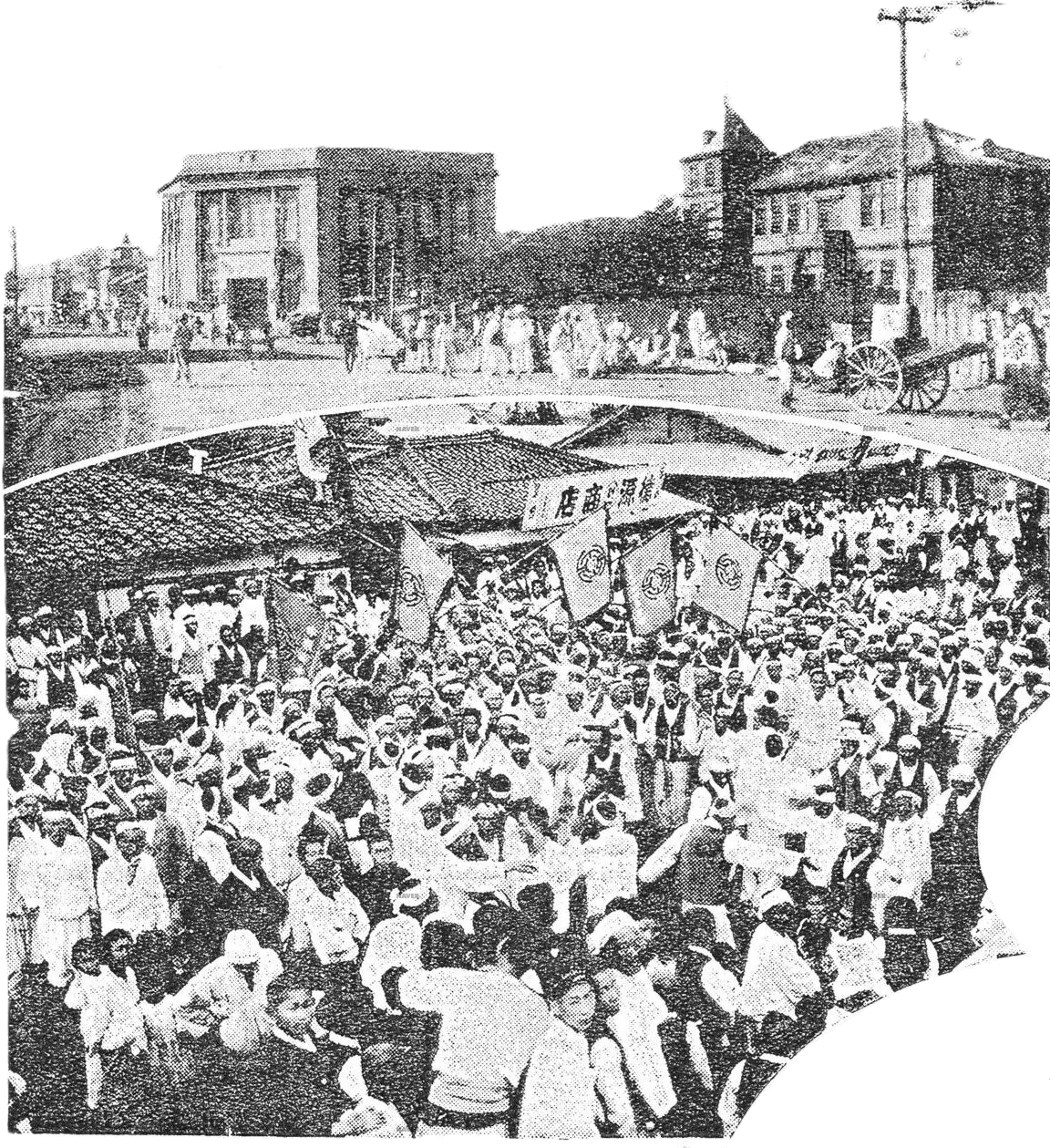
Photograph of the strike from the Chosun Ilbo, 1 February 1929

Wonsan general strike (Korean: 원산 총파업, 元山總罷業, Japanese: 元山ゼネスト) was a general strike that occurred in Wonsan in Japanese-administered Korea from 13 January to 6 April 1929. It is also referred to as the Gensan dispute (Japanese: 元山大争議) in Japanese historiography. Considered to be the largest labor dispute in Korea under Japanese rule, it signaled the upsurge of the labor movement in the late 1920s, and is considered to have played a pivotal role in the subsequent development of labor struggles in Korea over the following years.

== Background ==
In September 1928, at the British-operated Rising Sun Petroleum Company’s Bunpyo oil depot a Japanese supervisor assaulted, exploited and mistreated Korean workers. In response, the workers went on strike demanding the supervisor's dismissal, with transport workers joining in a sympathy. The company accepted the workers' demands on September 28, promising to improve conditions within three months, subsiding the strike.

== The strike ==
The company reneged on this promise in December and refused to recognize any labor unions; consequently, on January 13, 1929, the Wonsan Labor Federation launched a strike demanding a minimum wage, an eight-hour workday, the dismissal of supervisors, and the establishment of the right to collective bargaining. The Wonsan Labor Federation, which had been negotiating with the Rising Sun Petroleum Company, issued instructions on January 14 for a strike and for support from its affiliated unions. Initially, 300 workers at the Bunpyeong oil depot near Wonsan went on strike; management responded by dismissing the striking workers and attempting to break the strike by bringing in Chinese laborers. The Wonsan Chamber of Commerce, having received a request for mediation from the capitalists, adopted a confrontational stance toward the Wonsan Labor Federation; when the Chamber attempted to dismantle the Federation by refusing to hire its members starting January 21, the Federation declared a general strike on January 22. The total of 2,200 workers across 24 unions affiliated with the Wonsan Labor Federation joined the strike. This brought transportation and port operations in Wonsan to a complete standstill. Resisting the Chamber of Commerce's aforementioned attempts to undermine them, the Wonsan Labor Federation called for support from both domestic and international sources and continued the struggle. After this, solidarity strikes were held in Keijo, Pyongyang, Busan, Sinpo and Kobe.

As a result of the strikes, the Japanese police increased pressure on the Wonsan labor union, mobilizing firefighters, reservists, and approximately 300 personnel from an infantry unit in Hamhung to suppress the union. Despite these efforts, the worker’s resistance gained support from more Korean workers, farmers, students, and members of the bourgeoisie. A confrontation involving more than 10,000 participants soon erupted, receiving further backing from Korean, Japanese as well as Chinese, Soviet, and French labor unions. Strike funds were estimated to exceed 30,000 yen. The dispute was eventually resolved when the workers agreed to return unconditionally to work on 6 April 1929.
