= Sota (surname) =

Sota is a Spanish surname. Notable people with the surname include:

- Eljon Sota (born 1998), Albanian footballer
- Ernesto Sota (1896–1977), Mexican footballer
- Fran Sota (born 1990), Spanish professional footballer
- Isidoro Sota (1902–1976), Mexican footballer
- Ramón Sota (1938–2012), Spanish professional golfer
- Severiano "Seve" Ballesteros Sota (1957–2011), Spanish professional golfer
- Vicente Sota (1924–2017), Chilean politician

== See also ==
- Sota (disambiguation)
- Sota (given name), Japanese given name
- Jack LaSota, former Arizona Attorney General
- De la Sota, Spanish surname
