= Ullim Falls =

Waterfall in North Korea

Coordinates: 39.199469°N 127.137823°E

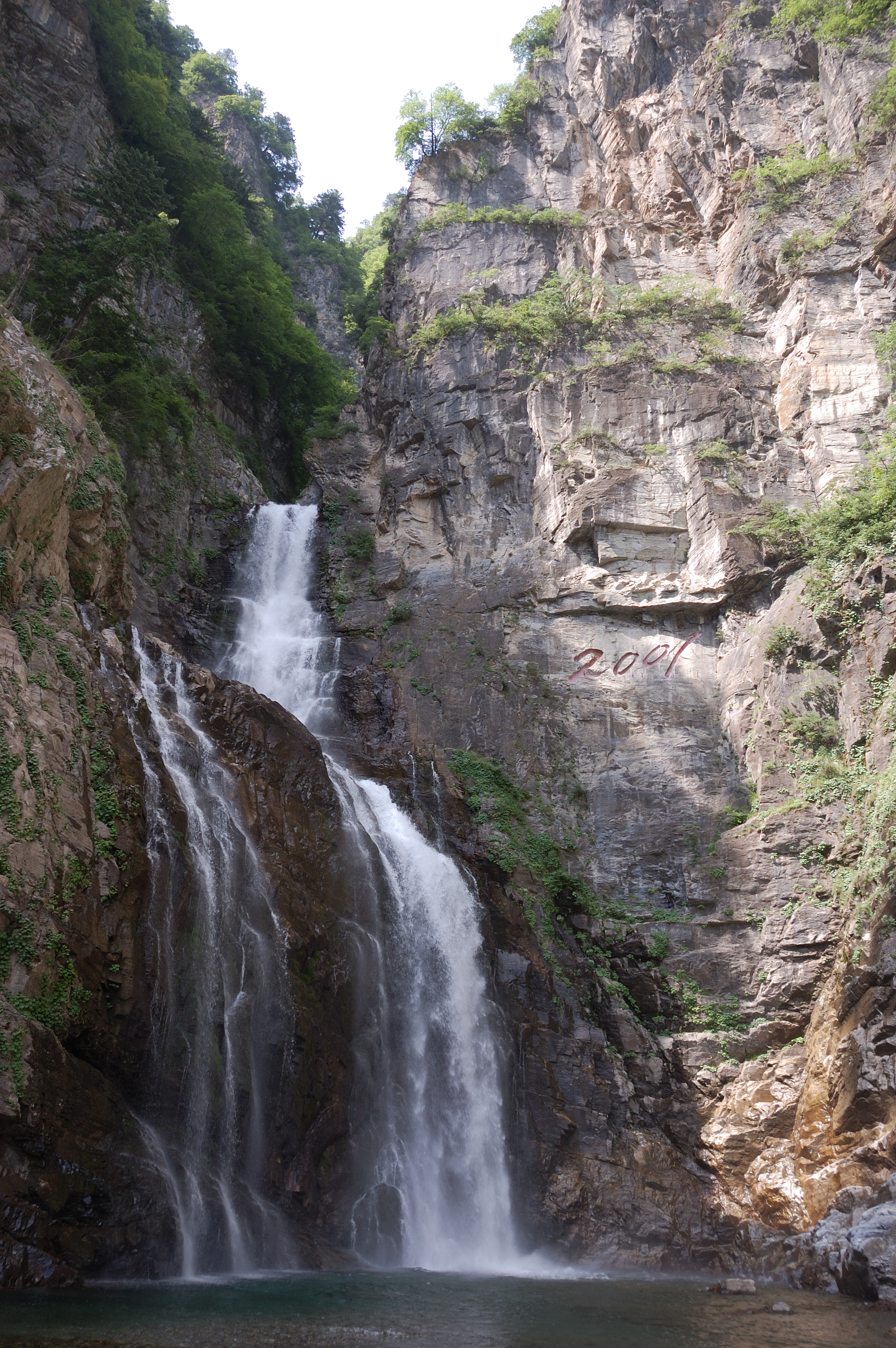
Ullim Waterfall in 2008

Ullim Falls (Note: Alternatively transliterated as Ulim Waterfall) ( 울림 폭포 ) is a waterfall located outside of Wŏnsan, North Korea.

== History ==
According to the Korean Friendship Association, the Ullim Falls were developed by Kim Jong-il in 1999, with a resort completed in 2001. It has been marked by the North Korean government as a tourist destination.

== Commemoration ==
The falls featured on two North Korean stamps: in the 2005 "Landscapes" series, and the 2017 "Autumn Landscapes" series.

== See also ==
- List of waterfalls
