= Musu Point =

Musu Dan Lighthouse
- Location: Musu Point, North Hamgyong Province, North Korea
- Coordinates: 40°50′04″N 129°42′51″E

Tower
- Constructed: 1911
- Foundation: concrete base
- Construction: concrete tower
- Height: 9 m (30 ft)
- Shape: cylindrical tower with balcony and lantern
- Markings: White

Light
- Focal height: 81 m (266 ft)
- Range: 23 nmi (43 km; 26 mi)
- Characteristic: Fl(2) W 15s

Musu Point or Musu Dan (Korean: 무수단; Hanja: 舞水端; 'Cape of the Dancing Water(s)') is a North Korean headland in the middle of the country's eastern coast along the Sea of Japan. It forms the eastern side of North Hamgyong's Hwadae County and the northern point of East Korea Bay.

== Names ==
In the 19th century, Musu Point was variously known as Cape Bruat or Boltin. It was known in Korean as Mong-pai-kat. During the Japanese occupation of Korea, it was known as Busui Tan.

== Geography ==
Musu Point is a promontory consisting of high reddish cliffs projecting boldly south but tapering down to the sea at its apex, which marks the northern end of East Korea Bay. It also forms the eastern end of a narrow but deep bay extending about 40 miles (64 km) west to Yongdae Gap. The peak of the mountain forming the cape has been reckoned as 1,542 feet (470 m).

A rock 16.8 m (55 ft) high lies just south of the point. Another, considered to resemble two crouching dogs when approached from the north or south, lies just off the coast 1.8 nautical miles (3.3 km; 2.1 mi) to its north.

The area is subject to abnormal magnetic variations.

== History ==
The Japanese passenger ship Koshun Maru, operated by the OSK Line, was wrecked off the point in 1910. Musu Dan Lighthouse, rising from near the cape's south extremity, was first erected the next year. The 83 m (272 ft) white structure is still active, but closed to the public. The American National Geospatial-Intelligence Agency notes, however, that "the existence and operation of all navigational aids should be considered unreliable on the east coast of North Korea".

== See also ==
- Musudan, officially called Hwasong-10, its namesake North Korean missile
- Musudan Village, its namesake village and missile launch site
- List of lighthouses in North Korea
