= Naval bases of the Korean People's Navy =

List of North Korean military facilities

The Korean People's Navy operates along both coastlines from major and minor bases. The Korean People's Navy headquarters is in P'yongyang.

== West Sea Fleet ==
The Western fleet has approximately 300 ships.

- Pip'a-got: limited operational and logistical support to patrol craft; also home to some submarines
- Sagot (Sagon-ni): home to Squadron 8
- Ch'o-do: small support base and home to Squadron 9 (fast attack craft)
- Tasa-ri: small naval base
- Haeju: major naval base and ship repair facility close to Demarcation Line
- Kwangyang-ni
- Sunwi-do
- Yomju (Yomju-gun)
- Yongwi-do

== East Sea Fleet ==
The eastern fleet has approximately 470 ships.

- T'oejo-dong: base for patrol boats and 1 frigate
- Wonsan (Munch'on): large maritime complex and HQ for East Fleet
- Ch'aho (Ch'aho-nodongjagu): one of two submarine bases in North Korea
- Ch'angjon: home base for smaller patrol boats
- Mayangdo: operational and logistical support for submarines, anti-submarine craft, and patrol boats; one of 2 submarine bases in North Korea
- Puam-ni: small base for patrol boats and landing craft
- Mugyepo: base for patrol boats, landing craft, and frigates
- Rason (Rajin): Major naval operations and training centre
- Puam Dong: base for patrol boats and landing craft
- Songjon-Pando: support base for patrol and missile boats; part of the larger Wonsan naval/maritime complex

Some ships are domestically built at the Wonsan and Nampho shipyards. Southern bases on both coasts are used to organize infiltrations into South Korea and Japan.
