= Wonsan =

Port city in Kangwon Province, North Korea

Wonsan 원산시
- Municipal City

Korean transcription(s)
  - Chosŏn'gŭl: 원산시
  - Hancha: 元山市
  - McCune-Reischauer: Wŏnsan-si
  - Revised Romanization: Wonsan-si
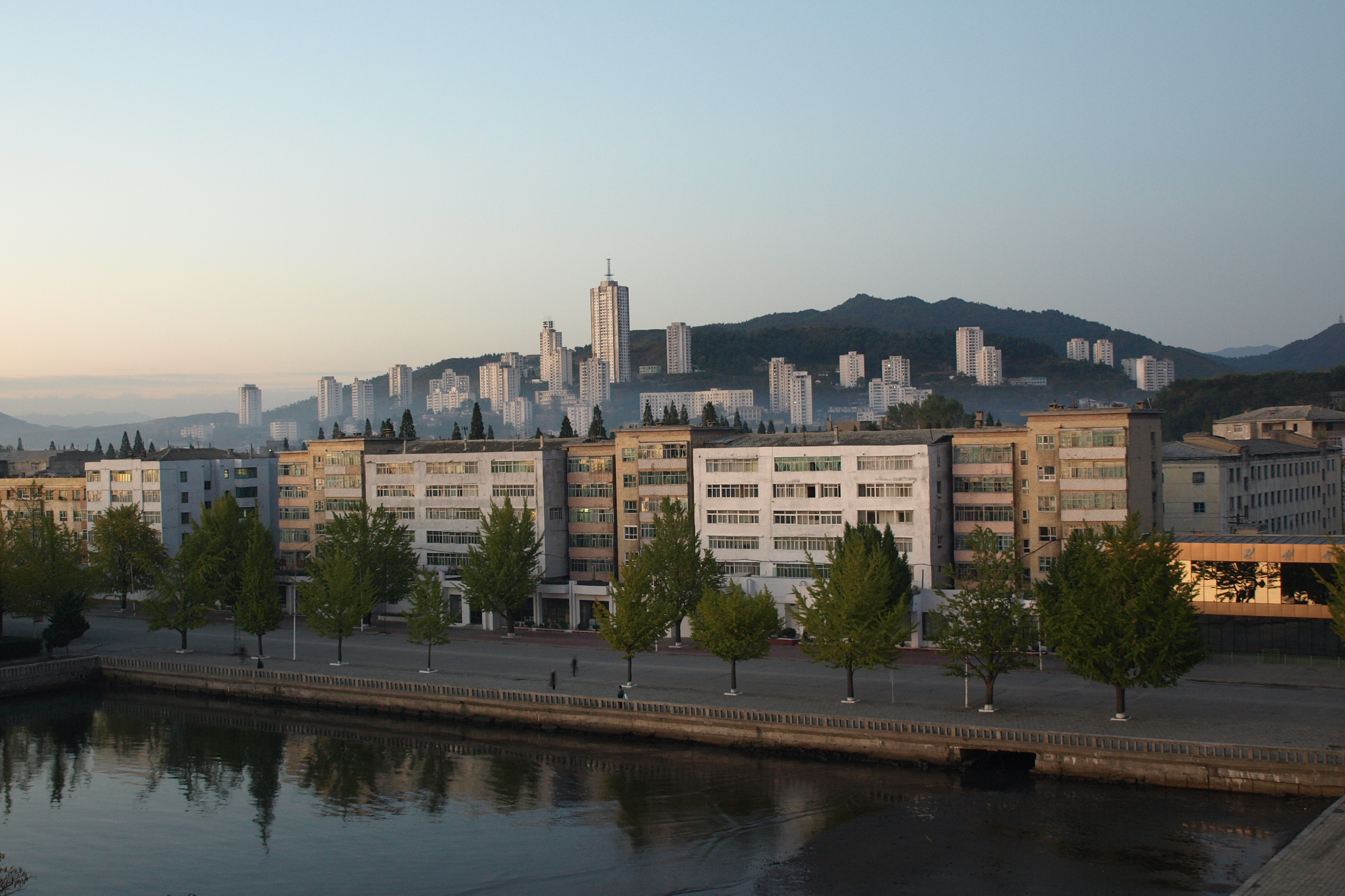
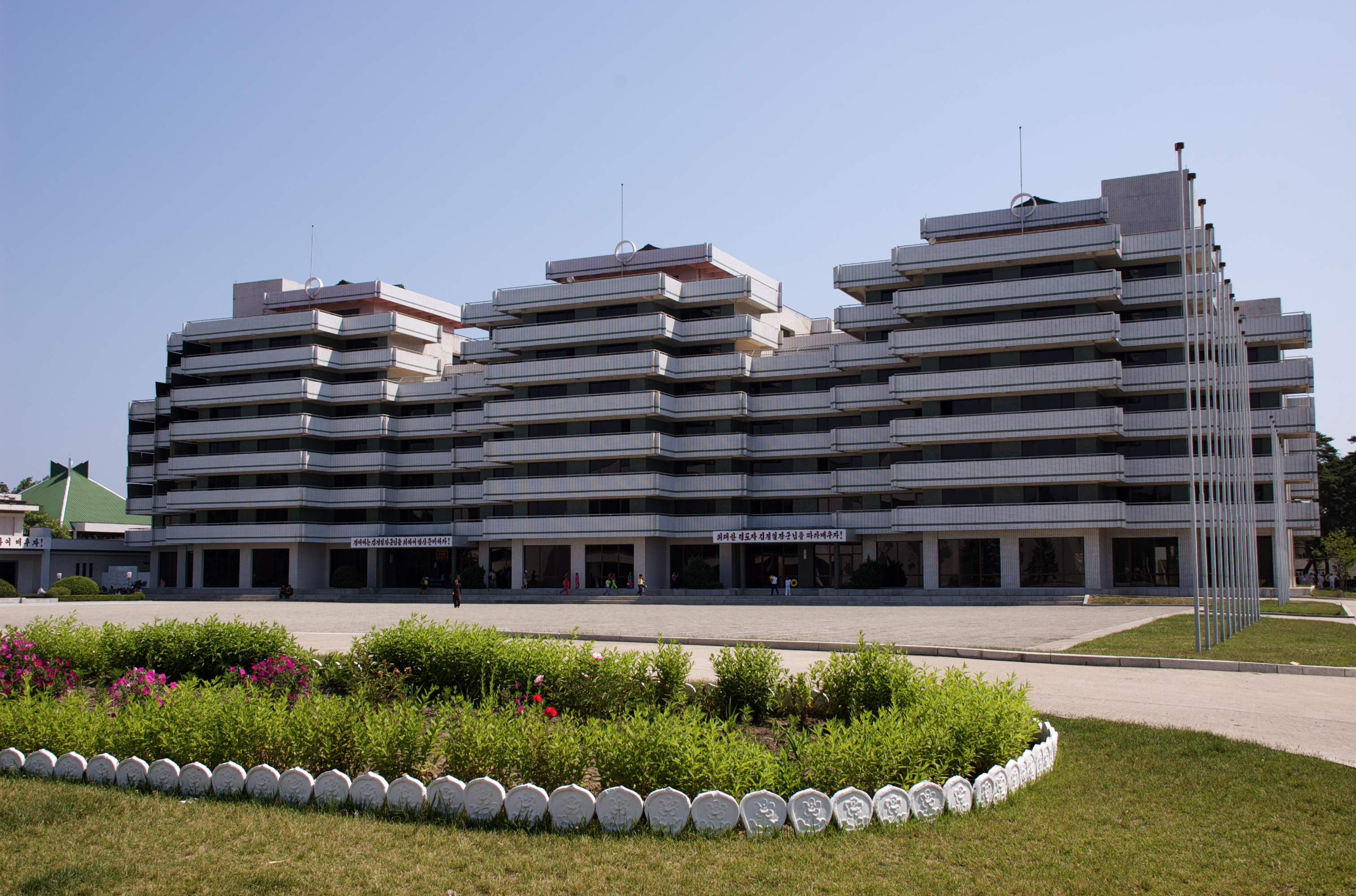
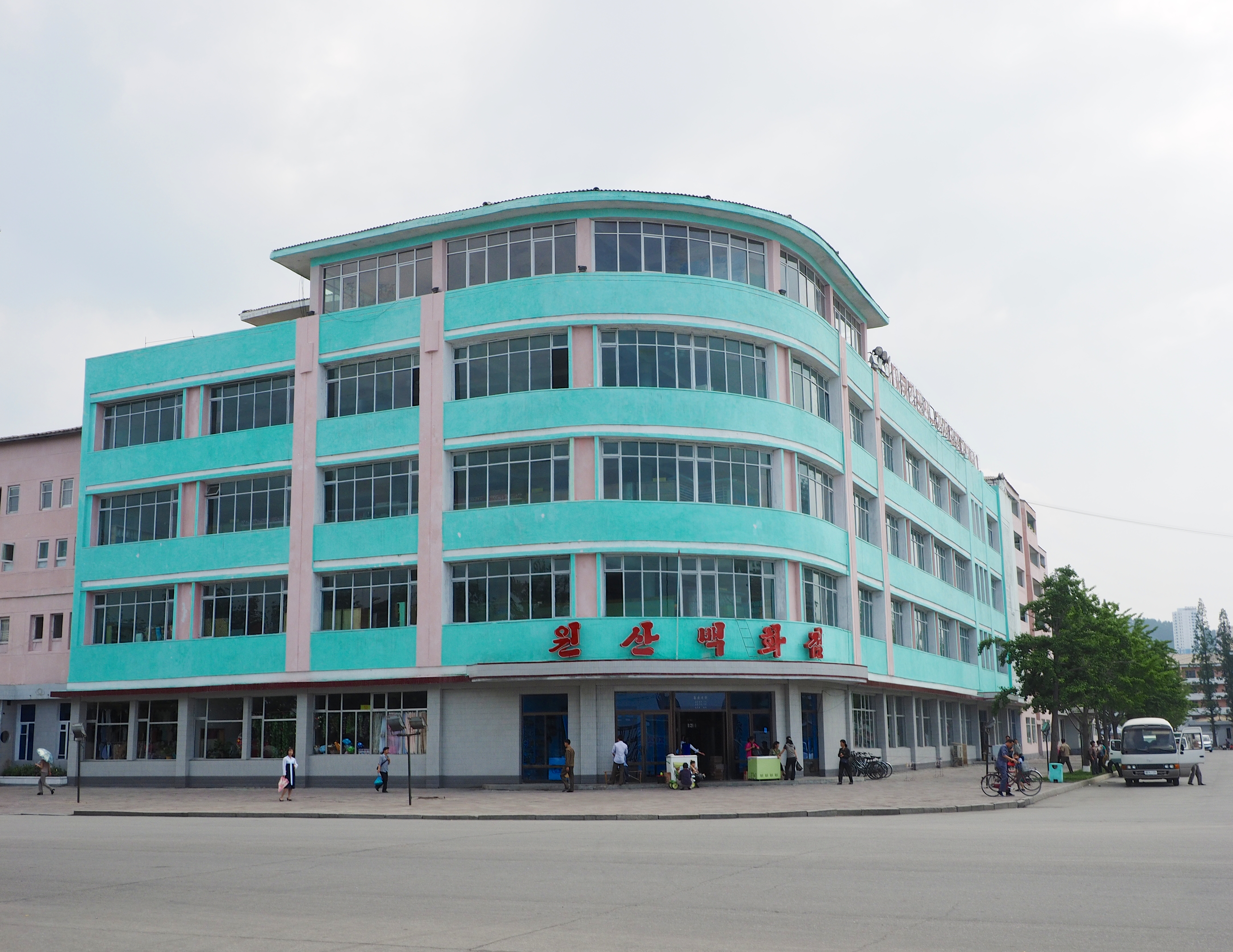
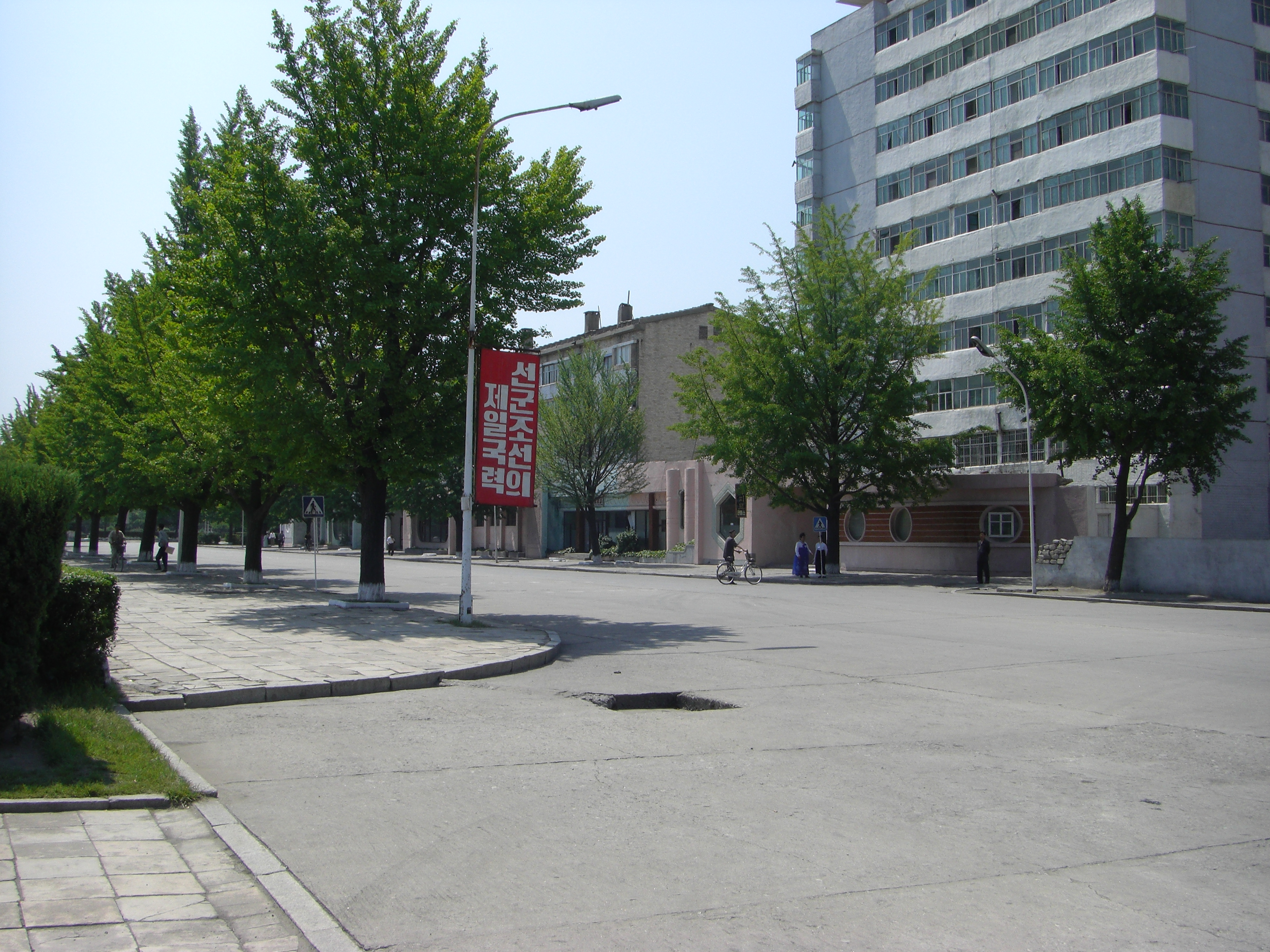
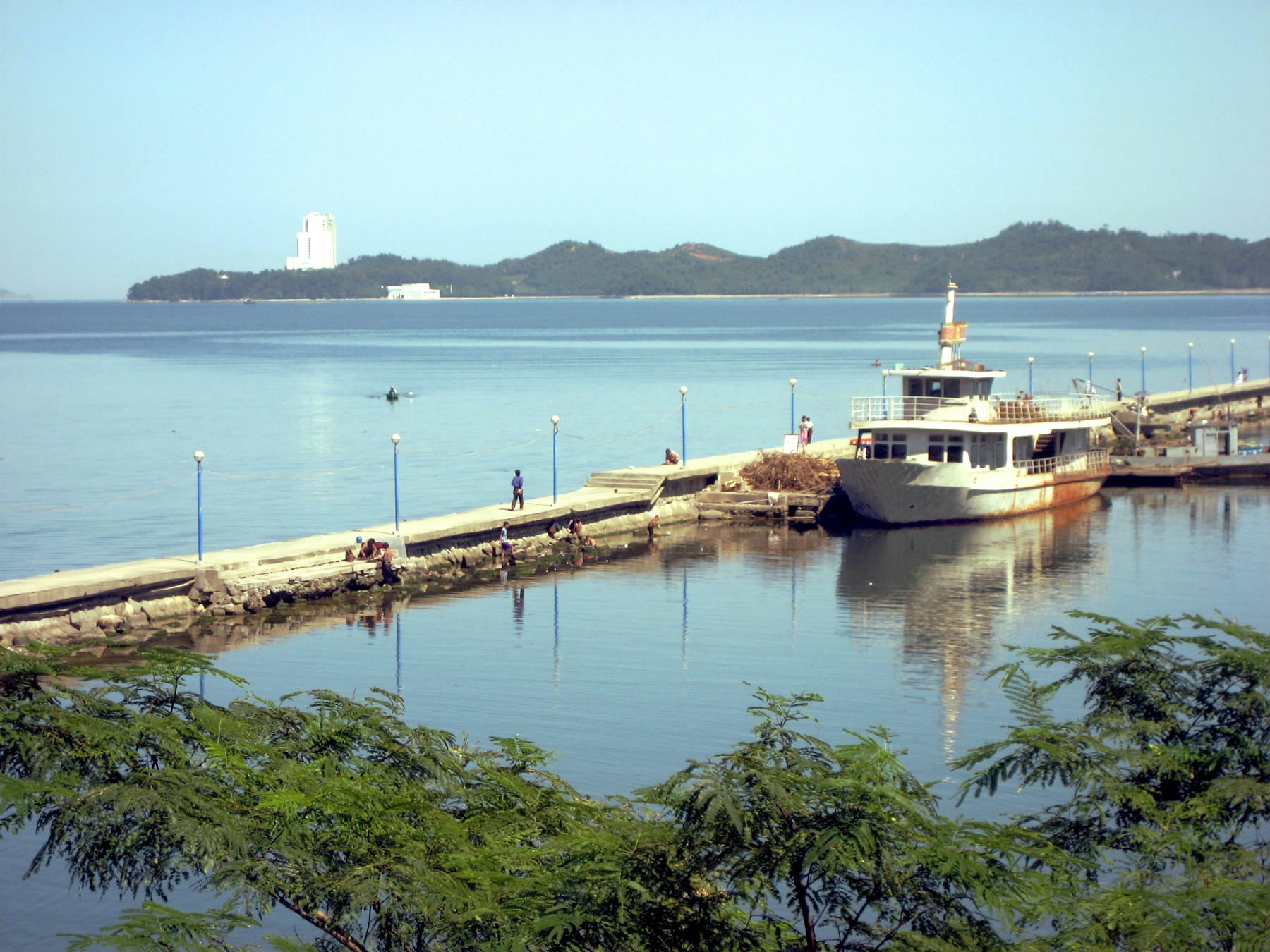
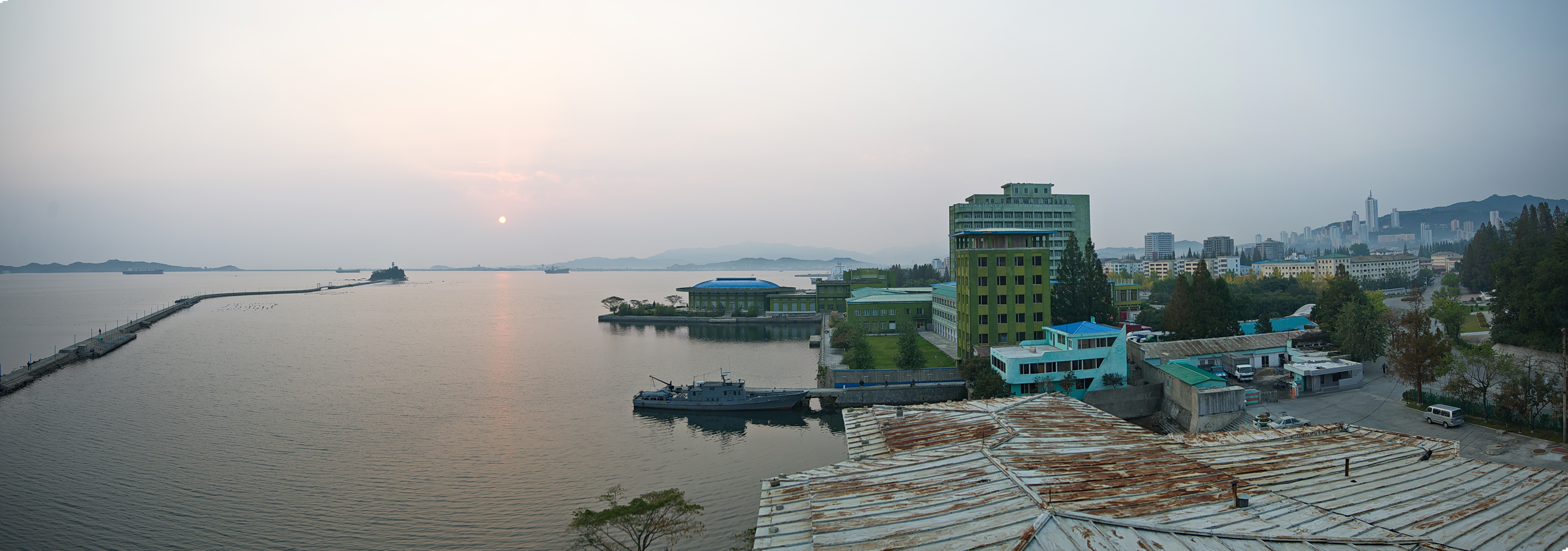
- View of Wonsan Songdowon International Children's Union Camp Wonsan Department Store Street in Wonsan East Korea Bay (view from Tongymyong Hotel) View of Wonsan port

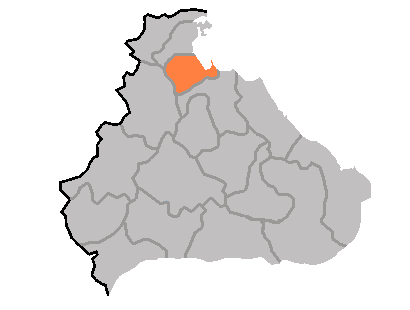
- Map of Kangwon showing the location of Wonsan

- Location within North Korea
- Coordinates: 39°08′51″N 127°26′46″E
- Country: North Korea
- Province: Kangwŏn
- Region: Kwandong, Kwannam (before 1946)
- Settled: c. 1800
- Divisions: 45 dong, 14 ri

Area
  - Total: 269 km^{2} (104 sq mi)

Population (2008)
  - Total: 363,127
- Time zone: UTC+9 (Pyongyang Time)

Wonsan (Korean pronunciation: [wʌn.san]), previously known as Wonsanjin (元山津), is a port city and naval base located in Kangwon Province, North Korea, on the eastern side of the Korean Peninsula, on the Sea of Japan. It is the provincial capital. The port was opened by Japanese forces in 1880.

Before the 1950–1953 Korean War, it fell within the jurisdiction of the then South Hamgyong province, and during the war, it was the location of the Blockade of Wonsan. The population of the city was estimated at 329,207 in 2013. Notable people from Wonsan include Kim Ki-nam, a diplomat and former Vice Chairman of the ruling Workers' Party of Korea.

In 2013, it was announced that Wonsan would be converted into a summer destination with resorts and entertainment. Having spent his childhood years there, Kim Jong Un has expressed significant interest in developing the region, with the construction of new infrastructure such as Kalma Airport, a dual-use civilian international airport and military proving ground. A state corporation, the Wonsan Zone Development Corporation, has been established with feasibility studies for a wide variety of hotels and commercial and industrial development.

== Name ==
Wonsan has also been known as Yonghunghang, Yuanshan in Chinese, Genzan or Gensan in Japanese, and Port Lazareva or Port Lazarev (Порт-Лазарев) in Russian.

== Geography ==
Wonsan's area is 269 square kilometres (104 sq mi). It is located in Kangwon Province, on the westernmost part of the Sea of Japan and the east end of the Korean peninsula's neck. Mt. Changdok (Changdok-san) and Mt. Nap'al (Nap'al-san) are located to the west of the city. More than 20 small islands flank Wonsan's immediate coastal area, including Hwangt'o Island and Ryo Island. Wonsan is considered an excellent natural port location. Mount Kŭmgang is located near Wonsan.

== Administrative divisions ==
Wonsan serves as the administrative center of Kangwon Province.

The City of Wonsan (Wonsan-si) is divided into 45 tong (neighborhoods) and 14 ri (villages):

- Changchon-dong
- Changdŏk-dong
- Changsan-dong
- Chŏkchŏn-dong
- Chŏnjin-dong
- Chungchŏng-dong
- Haean-dong
- Haebang 1-dong
- Haebang 2-dong
- Kaesŏn-dong
- Kalma-dong
- Kwangsŏk-dong
- Kwanphung-dong
- Myŏngsasimri-dong
- Myŏngsŏk-dong
- Naewŏnsan-dong
- Namsan-dong
- Panghasan-dong
- Pogmak-dong
- Poha-dong
- Pongchun-dong
- Pongsu-dong
- Phyŏnghwa-dong
- Ryŏdo-dong
- Ryongha-dong
- Ryul-dong
- Sambong-dong
- Sang-dong
- Segil-dong
- Sinhŭng-dong
- Sinphung-dong
- Sinsŏng-dong
- Sŏgu-dong
- Sŏkhyŏn-dong
- Songchŏn-dong
- Songhŭng-dong
- Sŭngri-dong
- Tŏksŏng-dong
- Tongmyŏngsan-dong
- Thap-dong
- Wau-dong
- Wŏnnam 1-dong
- Wŏnnam 2-dong
- Wŏnsŏk-dong
- Yangji-dong
- Changrim-ri
- Chuksal-li
- Chungp'yŏng-ri
- Chilbong-ri
- Chunsan-ri
- Hyŏndong-ri
- Namchŏn-ri
- Raksu-ri
- Ryongchŏn-ri
- Samthae-ri
- Sangja-ri
- Sinsŏng-ri
- Susang-ri
- Yŏngsam-ri

== Climate ==
Wonsan has either a monsoon-influenced hot-summer humid continental climate (Köppen: Dwa) using the 0 °C isotherm, or a humid subtropical climate (Köppen: Cwa) using the -3 °C isotherm.

Climate data for Wonsan (1991–2020)
Month	Jan	Feb	Mar	Apr	May	Jun	Jul	Aug	Sep	Oct	Nov	Dec	Year
Mean daily maximum °C (°F)	2.6 (36.7)	4.7 (40.5)	9.8 (49.6)	16.7 (62.1)	21.5 (70.7)	24.3 (75.7)	27.0 (80.6)	27.3 (81.1)	23.6 (74.5)	18.7 (65.7)	11.5 (52.7)	4.7 (40.5)	16.0 (60.8)
Daily mean °C (°F)	−1.7 (28.9)	0.4 (32.7)	5.3 (41.5)	11.5 (52.7)	16.5 (61.7)	20.1 (68.2)	23.4 (74.1)	23.8 (74.8)	19.6 (67.3)	14.0 (57.2)	7.2 (45.0)	0.6 (33.1)	11.7 (53.1)
Mean daily minimum °C (°F)	−5.7 (21.7)	−3.8 (25.2)	1.0 (33.8)	6.7 (44.1)	11.9 (53.4)	16.6 (61.9)	20.5 (68.9)	21.0 (69.8)	15.9 (60.6)	9.6 (49.3)	3.0 (37.4)	−3.2 (26.2)	7.8 (46.0)
Average precipitation mm (inches)	21.9 (0.86)	26.9 (1.06)	34.6 (1.36)	58.1 (2.29)	96.1 (3.78)	128.9 (5.07)	319.1 (12.56)	279.3 (11.00)	201.8 (7.94)	76.9 (3.03)	71.6 (2.82)	34.8 (1.37)	1,350 (53.15)
Average precipitation days (≥ 0.1 mm)	4.0	4.0	5.1	6.3	7.7	10.1	13.9	13.2	8.1	6.0	6.1	3.7	88.2
Average snowy days	5.1	4.2	3.7	0.6	0.1	0.0	0.0	0.0	0.0	0.0	0.9	3.3	17.9
Average relative humidity (%)	52.7	54.5	56.5	57.2	67.0	78.2	82.9	83.7	77.9	66.0	58.3	54.2	65.8
Source: Korea Meteorological Administration

== History ==
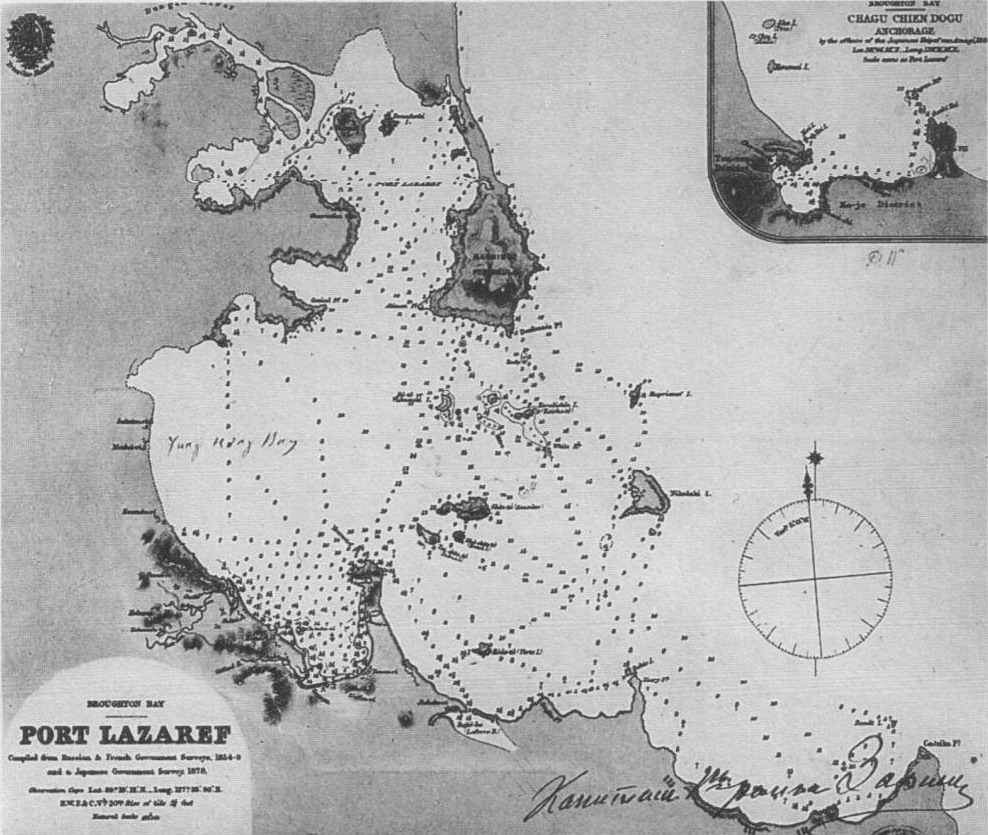
Map of Port Lazaref

=== Ancient history ===
Evidence of humans living in the area during the Neolithic period and Bronze age was found in the Chungpyongdong (Now promoted to ri) area, where pottery was found. The area was called Eo eul mae (於乙買) and Chonjung county (泉井郡), when it was under the rule of Goguryeo, and became Jungchon county (井泉郡) after it incorporated into the kingdom of Silla in 681. After Taejo of Goryeo conquered the region, the region was renamed as yongju (湧州) where it was ruled by a special defense administrator. The area was renamed again as Uiju (宜州), and a fortress was constructed in 1108. From 1258 to 1356, it was part of the Ssangseong Prefectures.

=== Modern history ===
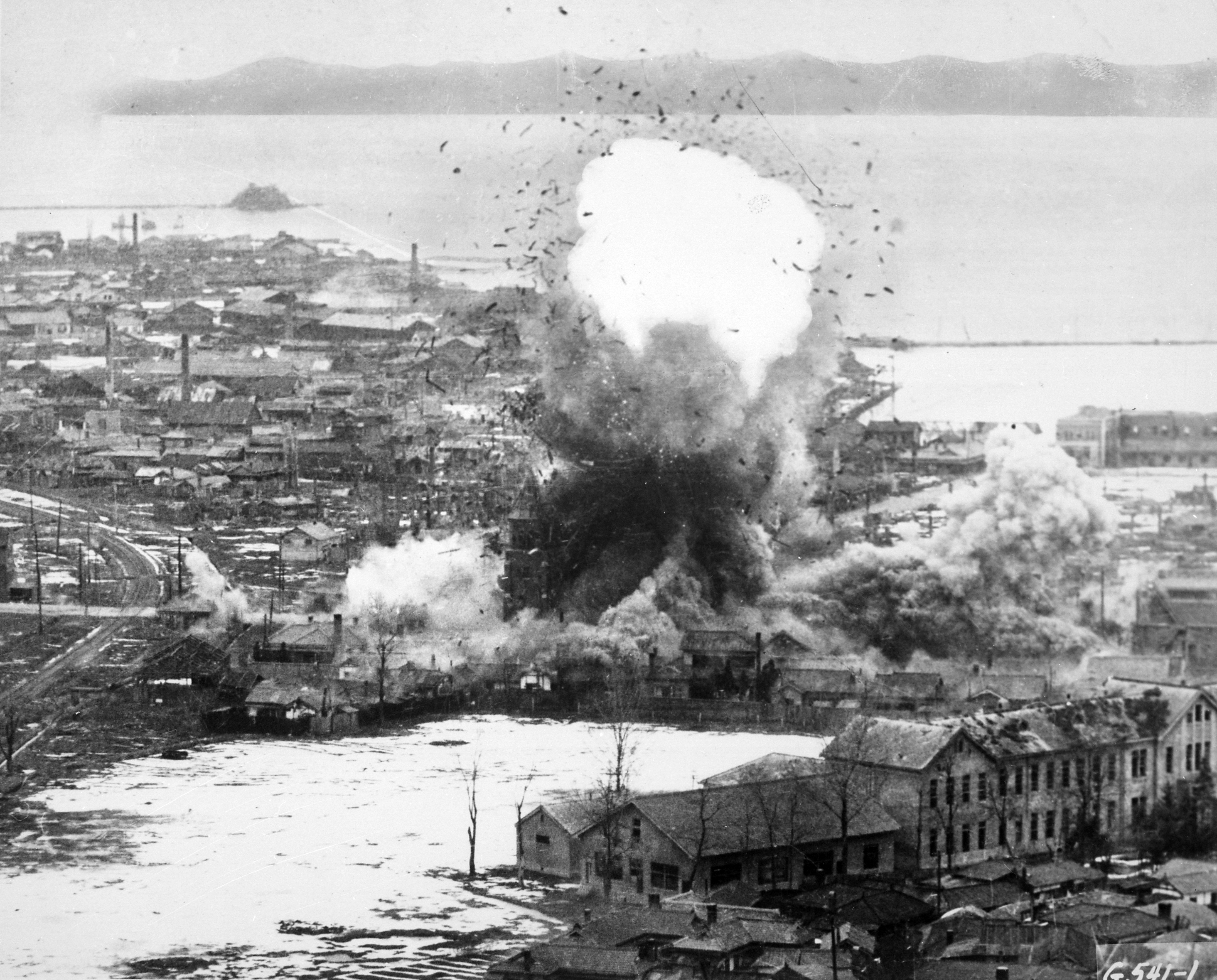
Bombing of Wonsan by U.S. during the Korean War

In 1854, the Russian Empire surveyed the area and found it highly desirable.

Wonsan opened as a trade port in 1880. Its original name was Wonsanjin (元山津), but it was also known by the Russian name of Port Lazarev (Lazaref). Under Japanese rule (1910–45) it was called Gensan (元山). In 1914 the P'yongwon and Kyongwon railway lines were opened, connecting the city to P'yongyang (then known as Heijo) and Seoul (then Keijo or Kyongsong). Thus, the city gradually developed into an eastern product distribution center. Under the Japanese occupation, the city was heavily industrialized and served as an important point in the distribution of trade between Korea and mainland Japan. In 1929, the city played host to a major general strike triggered by abuse of the Korean workers under Japanese occupation.

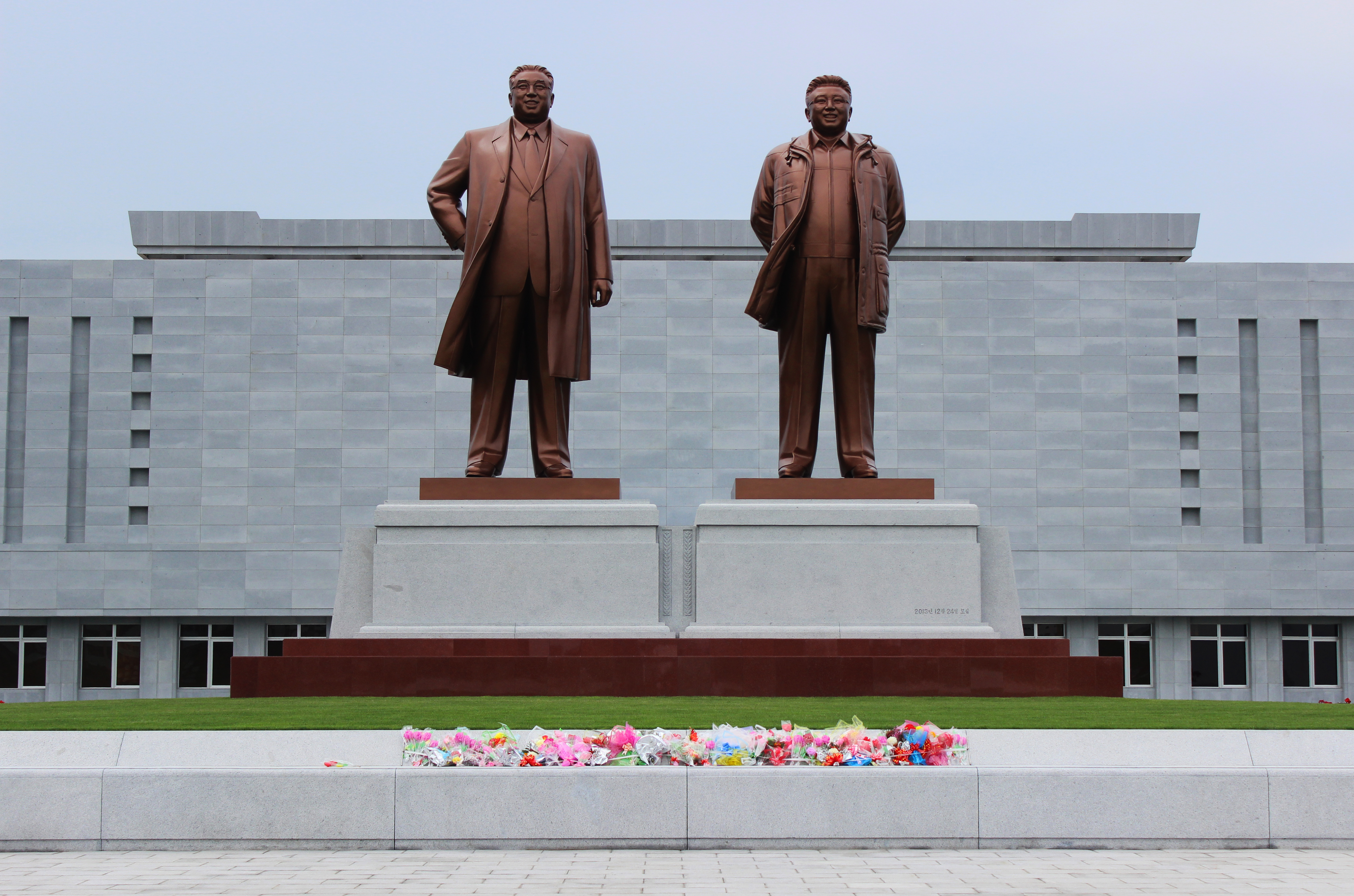
Statues of Kim Il Sung and Kim Jong Il in Wonsan

After the Korean War broke out it was captured by American and South Korean troops on 10 October 1950 during their drive north. They left ahead of the Chinese counter-attack, and the city fell under Chinese control on 9 December 1950. It was heavily bombed and shelled by the United Nations in the Blockade of Wonsan. According to the official US Navy history, Wonsan was under continuous siege and bombardment by the American navy from March 1951 until 27 July 1953, making it the longest siege in modern American naval history. By the war's end, the city was a vast shell.

=== City centre redevelopment ===
Kim Jong Un announced in 2015 plans for a $582 million redevelopment of the city center, which is to be entirely demolished and rebuilt. A 5-star hotel, a 17-story Wonsan International Finance Centre, and a $9.6m exhibition hall are expected to be built.

Kim Jong Un maintains a private compound in Wonsan that includes a palace with several guest houses, a harbor with a boathouse, a beach, and a racehorse track.

=== Provincial borders ===
Wonsan used to be in South Hamgyong, but when provincial borders were redrawn in 1946, it joined the northern half of Kangwon (which had been split at the 38th parallel north into a zone under Soviet control in the north and one of American control in the south in 1945) and became its capital, as Kangwon's traditional capitals Wonju (1395–1895) and Ch'unch'on (since 1896) both were south of the 38th parallel and south of the Military Demarcation Line that replaced the 38th parallel as a border in 1953.

== Food ==
Due to it being a coastal city, seafood is commonly consumed in Wonsan.

Wonsan is known for many local seafood delicacies including boiled rice with clam meat, a speciality of Kangwon Province.

== Economy ==
Wonsan has an aquatic product processing factory, shipyard, chemistry enterprise, a cement factory, as well as the 4 June Rolling Stock Works, which is one of the DPRK's largest railway rolling stock factories. The Wonsan-Mt. Kumgang International Tourist Zone, announced in 2014, was set to become an investment hub in North Korea. The investment proposal, titled 'Integrated Development of Jung-dong,' aims to construct 4 blocks of 30-storied and 6 blocks of 21-storied apartments for lease in No.1 and No.2 districts. The proposal includes around 2,000 flats with 3-4 living rooms. The area is primarily developed for foreign investors and is adjacent to "Office Work" complexes, including an international financial building, leasing office building, and restaurants specializing in International cuisine. The plan also includes an international finance complex, which was previously referred to as a "financial service center" but has been renamed to "financial complex."

== Transportation ==
=== Road and rail ===
The district of Wonsan-si is served by several stations on the Kangwon Line of the Korean State Railway, including a branch to the port; it is also connected to the national road network, and is the terminus of the P'yongyang-Wonsan Tourist Motorway and the Wonsan-Kŭmgangsan Highway.

==== Urban transit ====
A trolleybus system with two lines is currently in operation in Wonsan. The system opened on 8 September 1988, from Wonsan station to Changchon-dong. In 2020, there were three new trolleybus lines under construction in the city, which is aimed at reducing the number of fossil fuel-powered vehicles and to prevent air pollution, and a covered depot was opened. Prior to that, the vehicles were parked on the western loop. Services were often interrupted during this time. The new lines were planned to run from Changchon-dong to Kalma station, to Songdowon and to Myongsasimiri-dong. NK News however, incorrectly reported by implying that it was only being revived recently, while in fact, new Chollima-321 trolleybuses had been delivered since 2019. In 2020, the extension from Changchon-dong to Kalma station was completed, while in 2021, a fully new line was opened, and trolleybuses started to run to Songdowon, from Changchon-dong.

A tram line is also under construction, with the trams to be built by the Kim Chong-t'ae Electric Locomotive Works. The trams will be narrow gauge vehicles. This was after Kim Jong Un stressed the need for a tram line at the resort area. The line was completed on 24 November 2020, though passenger service has not started due to the incomplete state of the rest of the resort.

=== Air ===
The city has the dual purpose military and civilian Wonsan Airport (IATA: WON) equipped with 01/19 and 15/33 dual runways. Images from Google Earth from July and August 2014 indicated that major expansion was taking place, including the construction of two new runways. There is also an underground air force runway which runs through a mountain, near Wonsan. North Korea's first public air show, the Wonsan International Friendship Air Festival, was held at Wonsan Airport in September 2016.

=== Sea ===
Wonsan was also the terminus of the Mangyongbong-92 ferry that operated between Wonsan and Niigata, which was the only direct connection between Japan and North Korea. This service was canceled in 2006 when Japan banned North Korean ships.

== Media ==
Wonsan has at least one provincial newspaper.

The Korean Central Broadcasting Station maintains a 250-kilowatt mediumwave transmitter broadcasting on 882 kHz AM.

== Education ==
Wonsan is home to Songdowon University, Kŭmgang University, Tonghae University, the Jong Jun Thaek University of Economics, Wonsan University of Medicine, the Jo Gun Sil University of Engineering, Wonsan First University of Education, Ri Su Dok University, and the Maritime Patrol Academy, the commissioned officer's training school of the Korean People's Navy.

== Sports ==
The city is home to Unp'asan Sports Club, an association football club that plays in the DPR Korea First Class Sports Group, North Korea's premier league.

== Tourism ==
Wonsan has long been a popular tourism destination for both Koreans and international visitors. Attractions include Songdowon beach, the site of the Songdowon International Children's Union Camp, which maintains exceptionally clear and clean water. Pine trees are abundant in the surrounding area, and it has been designated a national sightseeing point. The nearby Kalma Peninsula is to feature a new hotel and a bathing area.

=== Wonsan Special Tourist Zone ===
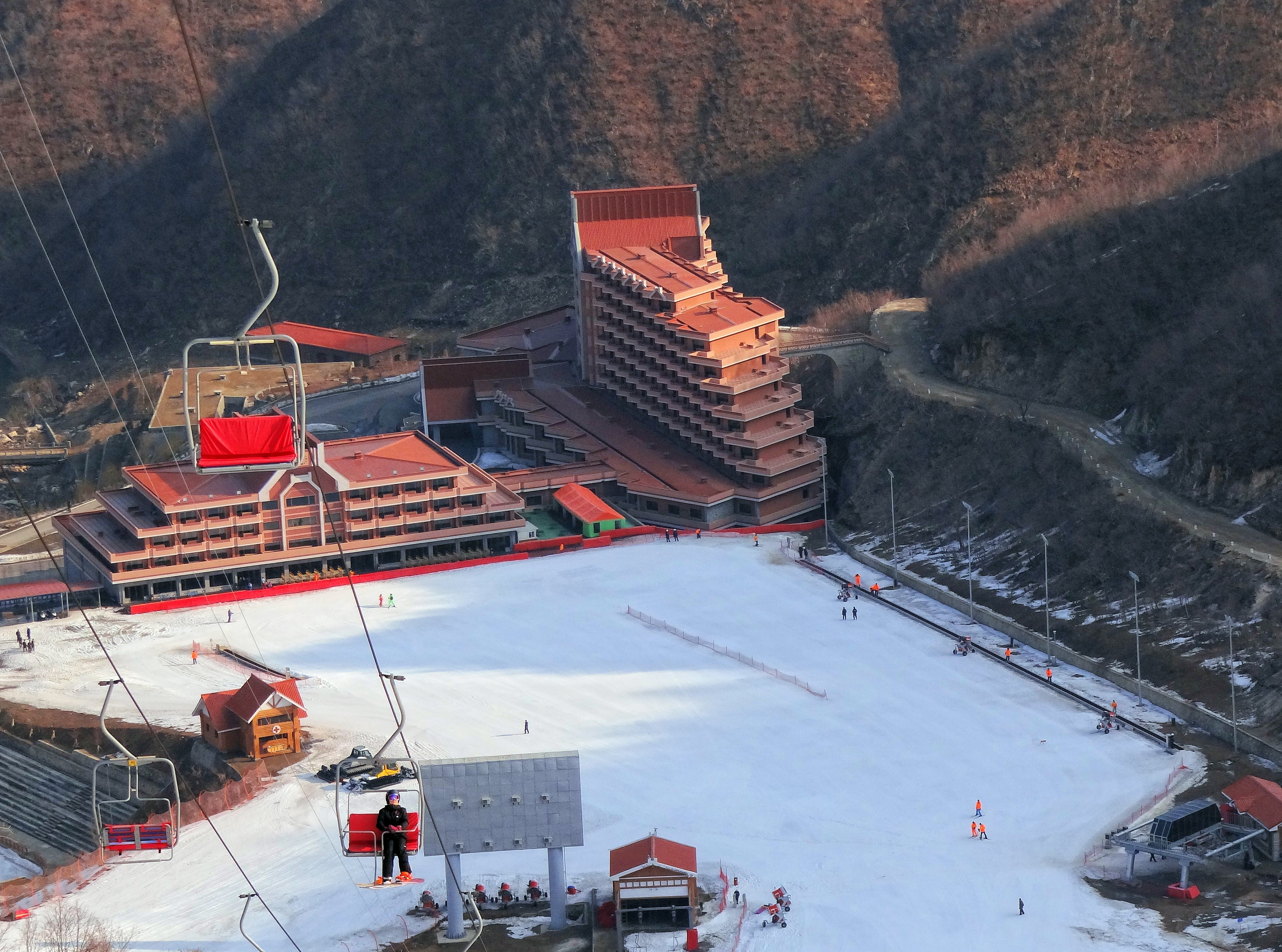
The hotel at the Masikryong Ski Resort.

Announced in 2014, the Wonsan Special Tourist Zone is to cover more than 400 square km and boasts 40 historical relics, 10 sand beaches, 680 tourist attractions, four mineral springs, and several bathing resorts and natural lakes. As part of this development, the Masikryong Ski Resort was built in 2016. A $123m golf course is planned outside the city.

=== Songdowon ===
Songdowon is a scenic spot by the Sea of Japan, 3 km northwest of downtown Wonsan.

The name Songdowon comes from the fact that when looked down from a high place, the pine trees look like waves. Songdowon is a scenic spot of the Sea of Japan that has been widely known since ancient times, where the clear blue waves of the Sea of Japan, the white sandy field stretching far along the seashore, the thick pine forest along the sandy field, and the flowering dandelion flowers harmonize with each other, creating a reminiscent of a picture.

Songdowon is organized as one large amusement park in an area of about 500 hectares which is divided into about 10 scenic areas such as the beach area, Jangdoksan sightseeing area, and pine forest area.

=== Myongsasibri ===
Myongsasibri is a scenic spot on the southeastern seashore of the Karma Peninsula in Wonsan.

The sand dune of the Kalma Peninsula extending into Wonsan Bay is four miles long. The name Myongsasibri comes from a famous sandy field with a length of 10 ri (4 km). It is about 7 km from Namdaechon (Anbyon) fishing port. The width of the sand field is 0.7 km in the narrow part and 1.3 km in the wide part.

=== Sokwangsa Temple ===
Sokwangsa Temple is a temple from the late Koryo-Joson dynasties. In 1386, at the end of the Koryo Dynasty, Ungjinjon was first built, and after that, more than 50 large and small buildings were built during the Joson dynasty. Sokwangsa Temple is a valuable cultural heritage that shows the excellent architectural skills of feudal Korea.

=== Songdowon International Children's Camp ===
The Songdowon International Children's Camp, located in Wonsan, is a summer camp that hosts around 400 international children annually. The camp has undergone major renovations in 2014, increasing its maximum capacity to 1200 children. The camp offers various activities, including a water park, a football pitch, and a large private beach area. The camp's exterior features dormitories, recreational buildings, a gym, an aquarium where campers can learn about flora and fauna, a history of birds, and a display room for taxidermy animals. The camps also has a well-equipped cooking practice room so that campers can learn to cook various foods on their own. The camp's main events include cultural exchanges between countries, where students perform culturally relevant songs and dances.

Other classes offered at the camp include cooking, boating, football, various educational classes, camping, video games, and other sports. The camp's cost for international children is approximately $300 USD per week.

=== Lake Sijung ===
It is a lake on the seaside on the Wonsan-Mt. Kumgang road. it is an ideal place to enjoy sea tours, lake tours, and therapeutic tours at the same time. Lake Sijung was originally a small lagoon on the shores of the Sea of Japan, but was blocked with sand. It is now a beautiful Lake with an area of 2.94 sq. km and a circumference of 11.8 km, and is registered as a natural monument. There are 7 islands in the lake, and in particular, the bottom is covered with high-quality Gamthang, a traditional way of treatment from mud. There are sanatoriums and resting places for experiencing Gamthang. Lake Sijung has a white sandy beach on the Sea of Japan.

=== Sinphyong-Kumgang Scenic Site ===
The Sinphyong-Kumgang Scenic Site is located on the Ahobiryong mountain range that extends to the central region of Korea.

Its development began in December 2009 and was completed in four years.

It is located 124 km from Pyongyang, and the total site area is 1820 hectares.

Sinphyong-Kumgang Scenic Site has a total of 70 attractions, including Okryudaegol, Namgang Chongsokjong, Tanphunggol, Kumgang Waterfall Valley, Tohwa Cave, and Nounphogol. Visitors to this place appreciate the natural scenery of spring, summer, autumn, and winter.

=== Ullim Falls ===
At 75 metres high, Ullim Falls is one of the most famous waterfalls in Korea. It is so called due to the sound of the waterfall that shakes the valley and travels far.

The water of the fall originates in the Masikryong Mountains and 20-25 cubic metres of water falls down per second in the middle of a steep cliff. Below the falls is a pond, which is 1.5 metres in depth and 30 metres in radius.

It is a favoured cultural recreation ground.

Other famous scenic sites near Wonsan include Chongsokchon and Mt. Kŭmgang. The German Church is the former church of the Tokwon abbey, now used by the Wonsan University of Agriculture.

=== Wonsan-Kalma Coastal Tourist Area ===
In July 2016, KCNA announced that the Kalma area, located near a former military proving ground and training area located on the central east coast of North Korea, would be turned into a summer tourist resort. According to its press release, the area was expected to boast a "four-kilometer-long beach resort, not far away from such scenic spots as Mt. Kumgang, Lake Sijung, Chongsokjong and Lagoon Samil and the Masikryong Ski Resort".

It remained a priority project for the following years, until 2020, when the further works on it were halted. As of June 2025, most of the work on it was done. On 24 June 2025, Kim Jong un inaugurated the Wonsan Kalma Coastal Tourist Area. It is opened to domestic tourists on 1 July 2025. As for international tourists, it is barred, only open to Russians. The visit periodicity is not certain, foreign tourists were temporarily closed at the beginning of the opening. According to the tour group members have been there before, the environment is quite clean, but it seems that some additional work is needed, contact with local people is also limited. According to the Korean Central News Agency, it has hotels and inns with a capacity of nearly 20,000 people, and a beach service. It is said that there are facilities and various sports, entertainment, commercial and catering facilities, and cultural life bases that are not affected by the seasons. It also has an international airport called Wonsan Kalma International Airport (currently only accepts domestic routes). It is the largest single-owned beach resort in the world.

== Sister cities ==
- Sakaiminato, Tottori, Japan (1992–2006)
- Puebla, Mexico
- Vladivostok, Russia

== See also ==
- List of East Asian ports
- Geography of North Korea
- Naval bases of the Korean People's Navy
- Wonsan Tram
