= Sota (given name) =

Sota or Sōta is a Japanese given name. Notable people with the name include:

- Sota Aoyama (青山 草太; born 1989), Japanese actor and vlogger
- Sōta Fujii (藤井 聡太; born 2002), Japanese professional shogi player
- Sota Fukushi (福士 蒼汰; born 1993), Japanese actor
- Sota Higashide (東出 壮太; born 1998), Japanese footballer
- Sōta Hirayama (平山 相太; born 1985), Japanese football player
- Sota Kawasaki (川﨑 颯太; born 2001), Japanese footballer
- Sota Kawatsura (川面 聡大; born 1989), Japanese track and field sprinter
- Sota Kiri (桐 蒼太; born 1999), Japanese footballer
- Sota Kitahara (born 2003), American soccer player
- Sota Kitano (北野 颯太; born 2004), Japanese professional footballer
- Sota Miura (三浦 颯太; born 2000), Japanese footballer
- Sōta Murakami (村上 想太; born 1991), Japanese actor and voice actor
- Sota Nakazawa (中澤 聡太; born 1982), Japanese football player
- Sota Okamura (岡村 創太; born 1977), Japanese ski jumper
- Sota Sato (佐藤 颯汰; born 1999), Japanese footballer
- Shōnanzakura Sōta (勝南桜 聡太; born 1998), Japanese sumo wrestler
- Sota Watanabe (渡邊 創太; born 2000), Japanese footballer
- Sōta Yamamoto (山本 草太; born 2000), Japanese figure skater

== See also ==
- Sota (disambiguation)
- Sota (surname), Spanish given name
