= Tonghae Satellite Launching Ground =

Rocket launching site in North Korea

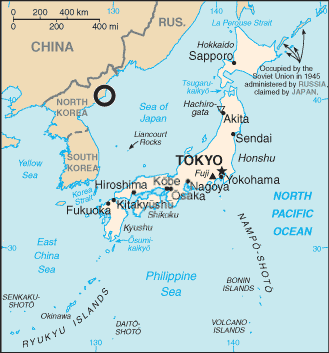
- Circle shows the North Korean Tonghae Satellite Launching Ground (previously Musudan-ri) in a regional context

Korean name
- Hangul: 무수단리
- Hanja: 舞水端里
- RR: Musudan-ri
- MR: Musudan-ri

Tonghae Satellite Launching Ground
- 무수단리
- North Korea

Location
- Coordinates: 40°51′30″N 129°41′11″E

Site history
- Built: 1980s
- Built by: North Korea

The Tonghae Satellite Launching Ground (Korean: 동해위성발사장), also known as Musudan-ri (무수단리), is a rocket launching site in North Korea.

== Location ==
It lies in southern Hwadae County, North Hamgyong Province, near Musu Dan, the cape marking the northern end of the East Korea Bay. The area was formerly known as Taep'o-dong (대포동) during the period when Korea was occupied by Japan, and the Taepodong rockets take their name from this. This single loose-surface road is susceptible to seasonal flooding. The site is 45 km northeast of port city of Kimchaek and 45 kilometers (28 miles) from the town of Kilju (길주읍). There is a small wharf located at the fishing village of Tongha-dong but can only accommodate vessels smaller than 40 meters in length.

== History ==
By the early 1980s, North Korea needed a flight-test facility for its program to reverse-engineer and produce copies of the Scud-B which it acquired from the Soviet Union in the late 60s. Previously, North Korea used a facility at Hwajin-ri, Pyongwon-kun, South Pyongan Province to test for anti-ship missiles and probably FROGs, surface-to-air missiles (SAMs) and other rockets. However, Hawjin-ri had insufficient range for the Hwasong-5, which would enter Chinese territorial waters during a test. The construction of the facility continued off and on throughout the 1980s and 1990s. Construction was made by the 117th Regiment under the Air Force Construction Bureau of the Ministry of People's Armed Forces. Construction of the launch pad was completed in 1985. During the early stage of construction, the site had an extremely rudimentary infrastructure, such as a few roads, a command bunker, a radar facility, and modest storage and support facilities.

However, by the early 1990s, the Tonghae site was reportedly expanded from 2 km to 9 km and the following infrastructure was added: a missile assembly facility, a fuel storage facility, a guidance and range control center, and tracking facilities.

The first launch from the site is reported to have occurred on 1 April 1984. Since that year, military rockets of the types Hwasong, Rodong and Taepodong-1 were launched from Musudan-ri. In 1998, North Korean media reported the successful launch of the Kwangmyŏngsŏng-1 satellite by a Paektusan-1 SLV from Musudan-ri. North Korea claimed their first satellite was successfully placed into orbit, but no independent sources have confirmed this. A review of the rocket engine test stand on DigitalGlobe imagery coverage from 15 February 2002 to 26 February 2009 revealed a variety of activity, including drying grain on the concrete, the presence of cylindrical storage tanks and the arrival/departure of multiple support vehicles and personnel. A second failed satellite launch attempt apparently occurred in 2009.

A total of 13 launches are reported from the site, with the last happening on 5 April 2009. The facility is in caretaker status as of 2020 and has been since 2014.

== Facilities ==
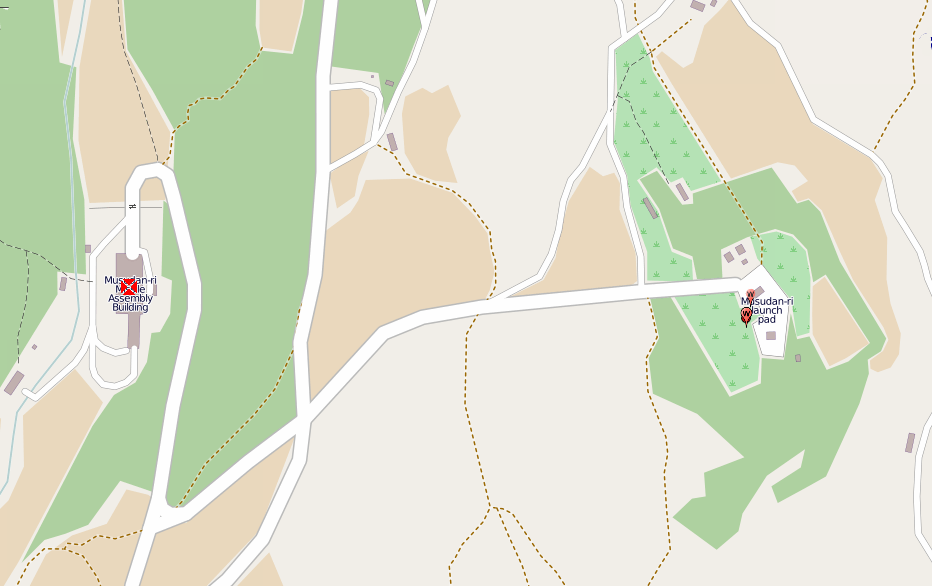
Map showing missile assembly building at the left, and the launch pad at the right

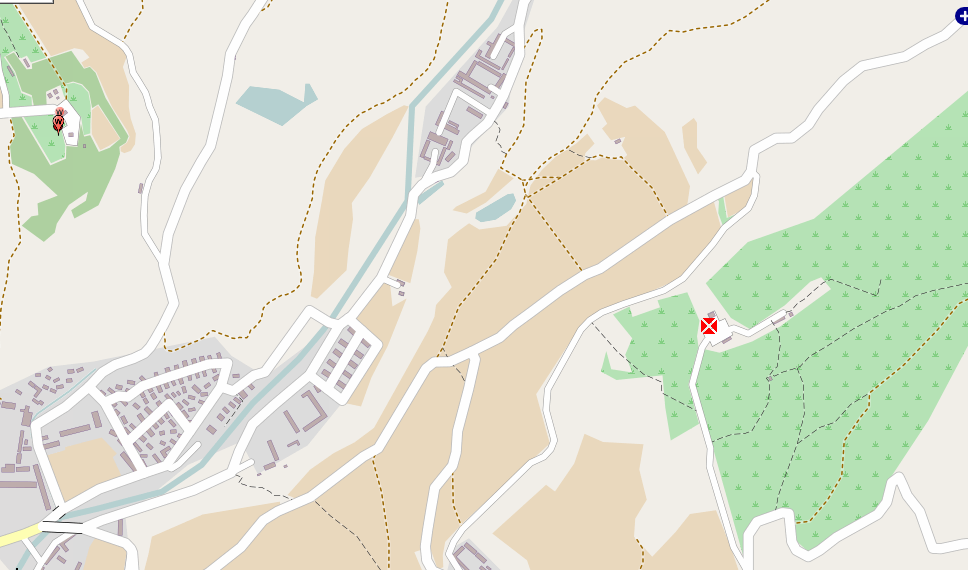
The launch pad at the left, the rocket motor test stand at the right, marked with a red X

The facilities at Musudan-ri are modest, consisting of a disused launch pad at 40.8557°N 129.6660°E and a new launch pad at 40.8582°N 129.6866°E. The disused launch pad consists of a 30-meter umbilical tower with a top-mounted gantry crane, a flame blast bucket, a launch blockhouse with a connecting access tunnel, two semi-buried liquid fuel storage buildings, a concrete apron/pad and multiple small support buildings. An engine test stand at 40.8523°N 129.6799°E, a missile assembly/checkout building at 40.8558°N 129.6592°E, a missile control building at 40.8630°N 129.6604°E and a Ground Tracking Facility (coordinates obtained from Wikimapia in April 2024).

== See also ==
- Sohae Satellite Launching Station
- Punggye-ri Nuclear Test Site
- Sinpung-dong Ballistic Missile Operating Base
- Korean People's Army
- Geography of North Korea
