= Alejandro de la Sota =

Alejandro de la Sota may refer to:

- Alejandro de la Sota (footballer) (1881-unknown), Spanish former footballer, co-founder and president of Athletic Bilbao
- Alejandro de la Sota (architect) (1913-1996), Spanish architect
