= Shota (Georgian given name) =

Shota (Georgian: შოთა) is a masculine Georgian given name that may refer to

- Shota Rustaveli (1172–1216), Georgian poet of the 12th century
- Shota Abkhazava (born 1971), Georgian racing driver, race cars designer and businessman
- Shota Arveladze (born 1973), Georgian association football player
- Shota Bibilov (born 1990), Russian association football player
- Shota Chochishvili (1950–2009), Georgian judoka
- Shota Chomakhidze (born 1978), Georgian association football player
- Shota Grigalashvili (born 1986), Georgian association football player
- Shota Iatashvili (born 1966), Georgian writer, translator, and art critic
- Shota Khabareli (born 1958), Georgian judoka
- Shota Khinchagashvili (born 1951), Russian association football player
- Shota Kveliashvili (1938–2004), Georgian Olympic shooter
- Shota Kviraia (1952–2011), Georgian security and police official
- Shota Laperadze (1930–1995), Georgian film producer
- Shota Lomidze (1936–1993), Georgian wrestler
- Shota and Margarita Metreveli (1913-1983/84), Georgian artists
- Shota Shamatava, Abkhazian politician
- Shota Voskanyan (born 1960), Armenian artist
