= Hwadae County =

Coordinates: 40°50′27″N 129°29′54″E

Hwadae County 화대군
- County

Korean transcription(s)
  - Hanja: 花坮郡
  - McCune-Reischauer: Hwadae kun
  - Revised Romanization: Hwadae gun
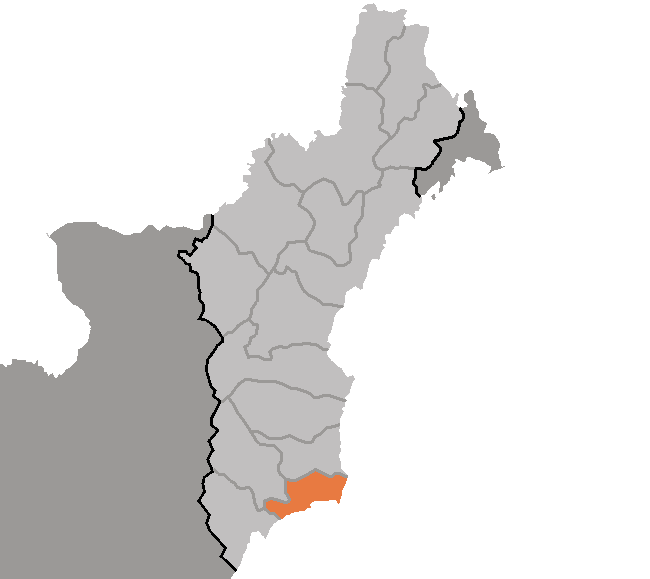
- Map of North Hamgyong showing the location of Hwadae
- Country: North Korea
- Province: North Hamgyong Province

Population (2008 census)
  - Total: 67,677

Hwadae (Korean: 화대군) is a county in southern North Hamgyong province, North Korea, with an area of about 460 km^{2} and a population of approximately 70,000. It adjoins the Sea of Japan (East Sea of Korea) on the east and south. By land, it adjoins Kimchaek and Kilchu to the west, and Myŏngch'ŏn to the north. The county was formed from parts of Kilchu and Myŏngch'ŏn in the 1950s, as part of a general reorganization of local government. Administratively, Hwadae is divided into one ŭp and 20 ri.

The southern region is relatively flat, while the inland north is rugged, with mountains of approximately 1,000 meters. The Musudan-ri missile base is located on the coast near its namesake cape, which forms the northern end of the East Korea Bay.

In April 2002, Paleolithic fossils of approximately 300,000 years age were reported to have been excavated from a lava bed in Hwadae. Goguryeo-period tombs have also been unearthed in the county.

The country's first satellite launch facility, Tonghae Satellite Launching Ground, is located in the county.

== Administrative divisions ==
Hwadae County is divided into 1 ŭp (town) and 20 ri (villages):

- Hwadae-ŭp
- Chaga-ri
- Changdŏng-ri
- Chŏngmul-li
- Chŭngsal-li
- Chuŭi-ri
- Ch'angch'ol-li
- Hap'yŏng-ri
- Kŭmsŏng-ri
- Kyohyang-ri
- Mokchil-li
- Musudal-li
- Pullo-ri
- Ryongp'o-ri
- Ryongwŏl-li
- Sap'o-ri
- Sŏkhyŏl-li
- Sŏksŏng-ri
- Songdong-ri
- Towŏl-li
- Yangch'ol-li

== See also ==
- Administrative divisions of North Korea
- Geography of North Korea
