= East Korea Bay =

Bight near the east coast of North Korea

Coordinates: 39.5°N 127.833°E

East Korea(n) Bay
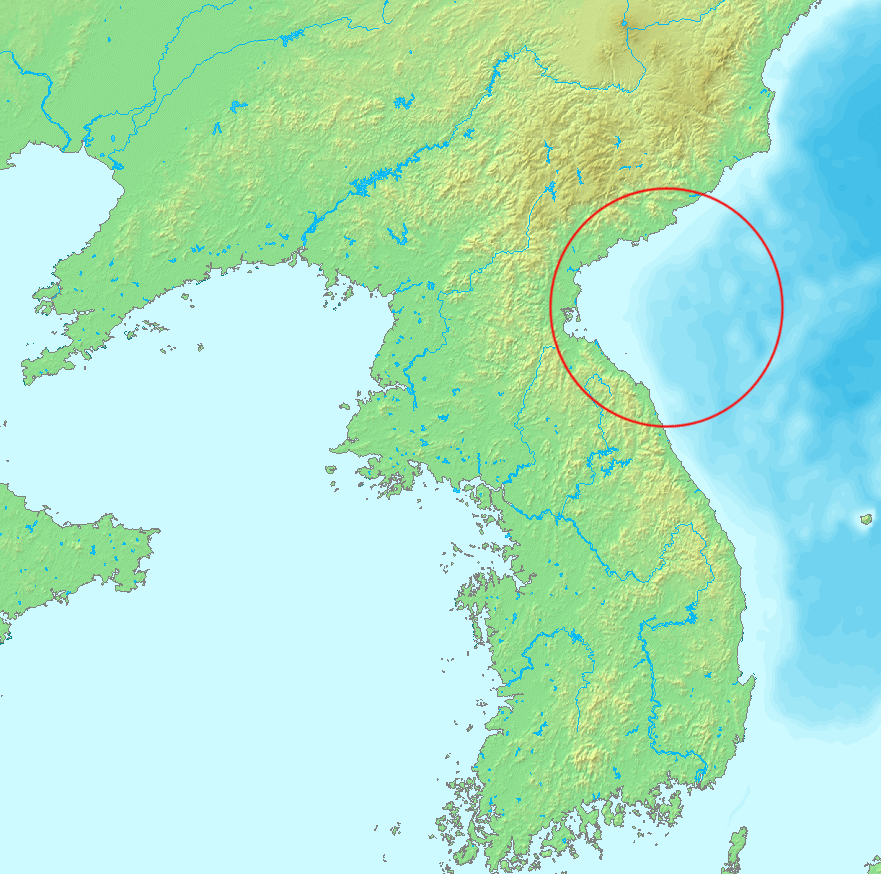
- The location of East Korea(n) Bay

South Korean name
- Hangul: 동한만
- Hanja: 東韓灣
Transcriptions
- Revised Romanization: Donghanman
- McCune–Reischauer: Tonghanman

North Korean name
- Chosŏn'gŭl: 동조선만
- Hancha: 東朝鮮灣
Transcriptions
- Revised Romanization: Dongjoseonman
- McCune–Reischauer: Tongjosŏnman

East Korea(n) Bay (Korean: 동조선만, 동한만), also formerly known in English as Broughton Bay, is a bight in the east coast of North Korea and an extension of the Sea of Japan, located between the provinces of South Hamgyong and Kangwon. Its northern end is Musu Dan, near the Musudan Village missile site which gave its name to North Korea's Taepodong and Musudan missiles. Whaling was once common in the region, targeting species such as fin whales.

== See also ==
- Geography of North Korea
- Korea Bay (West Korea Bay)
- Korean Peninsula
