= Songdo Point =

North Korean headland

Song Do Gap Lighthouse
- Location: Songdo Point, South Hamgyong Province, North Korea
- Coordinates: 40°01′54″N 128°19′42″E

Tower
- Construction: concrete

Light
- Focal height: 59 m (194 ft)
- Range: 12 nmi (22 km; 14 mi)
- Characteristic: L Fl W 7s

Songdo Point (Korean: 송도갑; Hanja: 松島岬; "Pine-Island Cape") is a North Korean headland in the middle of the country's eastern coast along the Sea of Japan. It is located in Sinpo in South Hamgyong province.

== Names ==
Songdo Point is also known by its Korean name Songdo or Song Do Gap. During the Japanese occupation of Korea, it was known as Shōtō-kō.

== Geography ==
Songdo Point is a dark promontory joined to the coast about 13 miles (21 km) east of Sinpo by a low white sand bar. It has two summits, which can appear to be small islands when observed from a distance. It is the eastern entrance to the Yanghwa Man.

== Structures ==
There is a 59 m (194 ft) lighthouse on Songdo Point which is active but closed to the public. The American National Geospatial-Intelligence Agency notes, however, that "the existence and operation of all navigational aids should be considered unreliable on the east coast of North Korea".

== See also ==
- List of lighthouses in North Korea
