= Shota (dance) =

Albanian traditional dance

Shota (indefinite Albanian form: Shotë), Vallja e Shotës or K'cimi i Shotës is an Albanian dance originating in northern Albania and Kosovo. It is an important symbol of Albanian sentiment and patriotism.

A professional ensemble from Pristina was established in 1950 by ethnic Albanians of Kosovo as one of the ensembles of Yugoslavia, and was named 'Shota' after the Albanian traditional dance. The Albanian traditional dance was originally choreographed by the Shota ensemble. Along with the Rugova sword dance, Shota is among the Albanian traditional dances that were adopted and performed by other ensembles of Yugoslavia, such as Kolo from Serbia and Tanec from Macedonia. It acquired popularity and was also adopted by many amateur groups within Yugoslavia, also spreading in other regions of Southeast Europe.

The dance involves synchronised steps and a strong rhythm. It is commonly played at weddings, folk festivals and other events.

== History ==
Shota originated as a traditional Albanian dance from Kosovo. The Albanian traditional dance of Shota was choreographed by Olga Skovran for the Serbian Ensemble "Kolo" in 1952, and a song based on its melody became widely popular in the 1970s in Yugoslavia. Shota professional ensemble from Pristina was named after the dance. The popularization of the dance in Yugoslavia helped the dance spread to the southern Danube Gorge in the 1970s, reach the northern side in the 1990s after borders opened, and more recently gain popularity at Romanian events in Banat.

In March 2013, the Assembly of Republic of Kosovo approved a law which makes the Shota ensemble a part of the cultural activities of the National Ensemble of Songs and Dances.

Since its inception, the community has been organising events that replicate the dance form Shota and are socially very active in areas of cleanliness, awareness about the dance form and the dress codes related to it.

== Bibliography ==
- Sugarman, Jane C. (2003). "Those "Other Women": Dance and Femininity among Prespa Albanians". In Magrini, Tullia (ed.). Music and Gender: Perspectives from the Mediterranean. Chicago Studies in Ethnomusicology. University of Chicago Press. pp. 87–118. ISBN 9780226501659. ISSN 1543-5512.
- UCLA (1989). "UCLA Journal of Dance Ethnology". UCLA Journal of Dance Ethnology. 13. UCLA Department of Dance.
