= List of spaceflight launches in July–December 2022 =

This article lists orbital and suborbital launches during the second half of the year 2022.

For all other spaceflight activities, see 2022 in spaceflight. For launches in the first half of 2022, see List of spaceflight launches in January–June 2022. For launches in 2023, see List of spaceflight launches in January–June 2023.

june 30

== Orbital launches ==
- ← Jan
- Feb
- Mar
- Apr
- May
- Jun
- Jul
- Aug
- Sep
- Oct
- Nov
- Dec →

Date and time (UTC)	Rocket	Flight number	Launch site		LSP	
Date and time (UTC)	Payload (⚀ = CubeSat)	Operator	Orbit	Function	Decay (UTC)	Outcome
Date and time (UTC)	Remarks					
=== July ===
1 July; 23:15	(United States) Atlas V 541	AV-094	(United States) Cape Canaveral SLC-41		(United States) ULA	
1 July; 23:15	(United States) WFOV-T	United States Space Force	Geosynchronous	Early warning	In orbit	Operational
1 July; 23:15	(United States) USSF-12 Ring	STP	Geosynchronous	Technology demonstration	In orbit	Operational
1 July; 23:15	(United States) USA-337	AFRL	Geosynchronous	Technology demonstration	In orbit	Operational
1 July; 23:15	USSF-12 mission. The USA-337 object was ejected from the USSF-12 Ring spacecraft. Final flight of Atlas V 541 configuration.					
2 July; 06:53	(United States) LauncherOne	"Straight Up"	(United States) Cosmic Girl, Mojave		(United States) Virgin Orbit	
2 July; 06:53	⚀ (United States) CTIM-FD	CU Boulder	Low Earth	Technology demonstration	7 December 2023	Successful
2 July; 06:53	⚀ (United States) GPX-2	Langley Research Center	Low Earth	Technology demonstration	In orbit	Operational
2 July; 06:53	⚀ (United States) Gunsmoke-L (Lonestar)	SMDC	Low Earth	Technology demonstration	28 December 2023	Successful
2 July; 06:53	⚀ (United States) MISR-B	Department of Defense	Low Earth	Technology demonstration	5 October 2023	Successful
2 July; 06:53	⚀ (United States) NACHOS-2	LANL	Low Earth	Earth observation	In orbit	Operational
2 July; 06:53	⚀ (United States) Recurve	AFRL	Low Earth	Technology demonstration	In orbit	Operational
2 July; 06:53	⚀ (United States) Slingshot-1	The Aerospace Corporation	Low Earth	Technology demonstration	In orbit	Operational
2 July; 06:53	STP-S28A mission, carrying 7 payloads. The ELaNa 39 mission, consisting of two CubeSats, was launched on this flight.					
7 July; 09:18:06	(Russia) Soyuz-2.1b / Fregat		(Russia) Plesetsk Site 43/4		(Russia) RVSN RF	
7 July; 09:18:06	(Russia) GLONASS-K 16L (K1 №4)	VKS	Medium Earth	Navigation	In orbit	Operational
7 July; 13:11:10	(United States) Falcon 9 Block 5	Starlink Group 4-21	(United States) Cape Canaveral SLC-40		(United States) SpaceX	
7 July; 13:11:10	(United States) Starlink × 53	SpaceX	Low Earth	Communications	In orbit	Operational
11 July; 01:39:40	(United States) Falcon 9 Block 5	Starlink Group 3-1	(United States) Vandenberg SLC-4E		(United States) SpaceX	
11 July; 01:39:40	(United States) Starlink × 46	SpaceX	Low Earth (SSO)	Communications	In orbit	Operational
11 July; 01:39:40	50th Starlink launch. First dedicated mission deploying Starlink satellites to Sun-synchronous orbit. First launch of Starlink Group 3 Satellites.					
12 July; 16:30	(China) Long March 3B/E	3B-Y85	(China) Xichang LC-2		(China) CASC	
12 July; 16:30	(China) Tianlian II-03	CNSA	Geosynchronous	Communications	In orbit	Operational
13 July; 06:30	(United States) Electron	"Wise One Looks Ahead"	(New Zealand) Mahia LC-1A		(United States) Rocket Lab	
13 July; 06:30	(United States) RASR-3	NRO	Low Earth	Reconnaissance	In orbit	Operational
13 July; 06:30	NROL-162 mission.					
13 July; 13:13:17	(Italy) Vega-C	VV21	(France) Kourou ELV		(France) Arianespace	
13 July; 13:13:17	(Italy) LARES 2	ASI	Medium Earth	Laser ranging Geodesy	In orbit	Operational
13 July; 13:13:17	⚀ (Italy) ALPHA	NPC Spacemind	Medium Earth	Technology demonstration	In orbit	Operational
13 July; 13:13:17	⚀ (Italy) AstroBio CubeSat (ABCS)	Sapienza University of Rome	Medium Earth	Immunoassay research	In orbit	Operational
13 July; 13:13:17	⚀ (France) CELESTA (ROBUSTA 1D)	CERN / University of Montpellier	Medium Earth	Technology demonstration	In orbit	Operational
13 July; 13:13:17	⚀ (Italy) GreenCube	Sapienza University of Rome	Medium Earth	Space farming	In orbit	Operational
13 July; 13:13:17	⚀ (France) MTCube-2 (ROBUSTA 1F)	University of Montpellier	Medium Earth	Technology demonstration	In orbit	Operational
13 July; 13:13:17	⚀ (Slovenia) TriSat-R	University of Maribor	Medium Earth	Technology demonstration	In orbit	Operational
13 July; 13:13:17	First flight of Vega-C.					
15 July; 00:44:22	(United States) Falcon 9 Block 5	F9-164	(United States) Kennedy LC-39A		(United States) SpaceX	
15 July; 00:44:22	(United States) SpaceX CRS-25	NASA	Low Earth (ISS)	ISS logistics	20 August; 18:53	Successful
15 July; 00:44:22	⚀ (United States) BeaverCube	MIT	Low Earth	Technology demonstration Education	In orbit	Operational
15 July; 00:44:22	⚀ (United States) CapSat-1	The Weiss School	Low Earth	Education	31 January 2023	Successful
15 July; 00:44:22	⚀ (United States) CLICK A	MIT	Low Earth	Technology demonstration	1 April 2023	Successful
15 July; 00:44:22	⚀ (United States) D3	ERAU Daytona Beach	Low Earth	Technology demonstration	In orbit	Operational
15 July; 00:44:22	⚀ (Japan) FUTABA	Kyushu Institute of Technology	Low Earth	Education	16 February 2023	Successful
15 July; 00:44:22	⚀ (Japan) HSU-SAT1	Happy Science University	Low Earth	Technology demonstration	11 March 2023	Successful
15 July; 00:44:22	⚀ (United States) JAGSAT	University of South Alabama	Low Earth	Technology demonstration	22 January 2023	Successful
15 July; 00:44:22	⚀ (Moldova) TUMnanoSAT	Technical University of Moldova	Low Earth	Technology demonstration	31 January 2023	Successful
15 July; 00:44:22	The ELaNa 45 mission, consisting of four CubeSats, was launched on this flight. TUMnanoSAT was Moldova's first satellite. TUMnanoSAT, FUTABA, and HSU-SAT1 were deployed into orbit from the ISS on 12 August 2022. D3, JAGSAT, CapSat-1, BeaverCube, and CLICK A were deployed into orbit from the ISS on 6 September 2022.					
15 July; 22:57:16	(China) Long March 2C	2C-Y71	(China) Taiyuan LC-9		(China) CASC	
15 July; 22:57:16	(China) SuperView Neo 2-01 (Siwei Gaojing 2-01)	China Siwei	Low Earth (SSO)	Earth observation	In orbit	Operational
15 July; 22:57:16	(China) SuperView Neo 2-02 (Siwei Gaojing 2-02)	China Siwei	Low Earth (SSO)	Earth observation	In orbit	Operational
17 July; 14:20:00	(United States) Falcon 9 Block 5	Starlink Group 4-22	(United States) Cape Canaveral SLC-40		(United States) SpaceX	
17 July; 14:20:00	(United States) Starlink × 53	SpaceX	Low Earth	Communications	In orbit	Operational
22 July; 17:39:40	(United States) Falcon 9 Block 5	Starlink Group 3-2	(United States) Vandenberg SLC-4E		(United States) SpaceX	
22 July; 17:39:40	(United States) Starlink × 46	SpaceX	Low Earth (SSO)	Communications	In orbit	Operational
24 July; 06:22:32	(China) Long March 5B	Y3	(China) Wenchang LC-1		(China) CASC	
24 July; 06:22:32	(China) Wentian	CMSA	Low Earth (TSS)	Space station assembly	In orbit	Operational
24 July; 06:22:32	Wentian is the first Laboratory Cabin Module of the Tiangong space station, and was docked and linked to the Tianhe core module.					
24 July; 13:38:20	(United States) Falcon 9 Block 5	Starlink Group 4-25	(United States) Kennedy LC-39A		(United States) SpaceX	
24 July; 13:38:20	(United States) Starlink × 53	SpaceX	Low Earth	Communications	In orbit	Operational
27 July; 04:12	(China) Kinetica-1	Y1	(China) Jiuquan LS-130		(China) CAS Space	
27 July; 04:12	(China) SATech 01	CAS	Low Earth (SSO)	Technology demonstration	In orbit	Operational
27 July; 04:12	(China) Dianci Zuzhuang Shiyan × 2	CAS	Low Earth (SSO)	Electromagnetic research	In orbit	Operational
27 July; 04:12	(China) GNSS-R	CAS	Low Earth (SSO)	Atmospheric research	In orbit	Operational
27 July; 04:12	(China) Jinan-1	Hefei Institutes of Physical Science	Low Earth (SSO)	Quantum key distribution	In orbit	Operational
27 July; 04:12	(China) Nanyue Science Satellite	SASTSpace	Low Earth (SSO)	Science popularisation	In orbit	Operational
27 July; 04:12	Maiden launch of Kinetica-1, previously known as ZK-1A or Lijian-1. CAS Space, also known as Zhongke Aerospace, is a commercial spinoff of the Chinese Academy of Sciences (CAS).					
29 July; 13:28	(China) Long March 2D	2D-Y65	(China) Xichang LC-3		(China) CASC	
29 July; 13:28	(China) Yaogan 35-03A	CAS	Low Earth	Reconnaissance	In orbit	Operational
29 July; 13:28	(China) Yaogan 35-03B	CAS	Low Earth	Reconnaissance	In orbit	Operational
29 July; 13:28	(China) Yaogan 35-03C	CAS	Low Earth	Reconnaissance	In orbit	Operational
← Jan; Feb; Mar; Apr; May; Jun; Jul; Aug; Sep; Oct; Nov; Dec →; === August ===
1 August; 20:25:48	(Russia) Soyuz-2.1v / Volga		(Russia) Plesetsk Site 43/4		(Russia) RVSN RF	
1 August; 20:25:48	(Russia) Kosmos 2558	Ministry of Defence	Low Earth (SSO)	Satellite inspection	In orbit	Operational
1 August; 20:25:48	Napryazhenie / 14F150 / Nivelir satellite, closely following USA-326 (NROL-87).					
4 August; 03:08	(China) Long March 4B	4B-Y40	(China) Taiyuan LC-9		(China) CASC	
4 August; 03:08	(China) TECIS	Ministry of Natural Resources	Low Earth	Earth observation	In orbit	Operational
4 August; 03:08	(China) Jiaotong-4 (HEAD-2G)	HEAD Aerospace	Low Earth	AIS ship tracking	In orbit	Operational
4 August; 03:08	(China) Minhang Shaonian	SAST	Low Earth	Education	In orbit	Operational
4 August; 03:08	100th consecutive successful launch of a Long March rocket since the Long March 3B launch failure in 2020.					
4 August; 05:00	(United States) Electron	"Antipodean Adventure"	(New Zealand) Mahia LC-1B		(United States) Rocket Lab	
4 August; 05:00	(United States) RASR-4 (USA-335)	NRO	Low Earth	Reconnaissance	In orbit	Operational
4 August; 05:00	NROL-199 mission.					
4 August; 10:29	(United States) Atlas V 421	AV-097	(United States) Cape Canaveral SLC-41		(United States) ULA	
4 August; 10:29	(United States) USA-336 (SBIRS GEO-6)	United States Space Force	Geosynchronous	Early warning	In orbit	Operational
4 August; 10:29	Final flight of Atlas V 421 configuration.					
4 August; ~16:00	(China) Long March 2F/T	2F-T4	(China) Jiuquan SLS-1		(China) CASC	
4 August; ~16:00	(China) Reusable Experimental Spacecraft	CASC	Low Earth	Technology demonstration	8 May 2023	Successful
4 August; 23:08	(United States) Falcon 9 Block 5	F9-168	(United States) Cape Canaveral SLC-40		(United States) SpaceX	
4 August; 23:08	(South Korea) Danuri (KPLO)	KARI	Selenocentric (Polar)	Lunar orbiter	In orbit	Operational
4 August; 23:08	Korea Pathfinder Lunar Orbiter (KPLO). A laser-etched photo mosaic of Starman and his Tesla Roadster, composed of user-sent images from Tesla's "Launch Your Photo into Deep Space Orbit" reward for their referral program, was bolted to the Falcon 9 second stage.					
7 August; 03:48	(India) SSLV	D1	(India) Satish Dhawan FLP		(India) ISRO	
7 August; 03:48	(India) EOS-02 (Microsat-2A)	ISRO	Low Earth (intended); Transatmospheric (achieved)	Earth observation	7 August	Launch failure
7 August; 03:48	⚀ (India) AzaadiSAT	Space Kidz India	Low Earth (intended); Transatmospheric (achieved)	Education	7 August	Launch failure
7 August; 03:48	First flight of India's Small Satellite Launch Vehicle (SSLV). A 'Data Loss' malfunction on the rocket during terminal stage caused satellites to be placed in an unusable transatmospheric orbit of 356 km × 76 km (221 mi × 47 mi).					
9 August; 04:11:00	(China) Ceres-1	Y3	(China) Jiuquan LS-95A		(China) Galactic Energy	
9 August; 04:11:00	(China) Taijing-1 01 (Pingan-3)	MinoSpace	Low Earth (SSO)	Earth observation	In orbit	Operational
9 August; 04:11:00	(China) Taijing-1 02 (Xingshidai-12)	MinoSpace / ADA Space	Low Earth (SSO)	Earth observation	In orbit	Operational
9 August; 04:11:00	(China) Donghai-1	ASES Space	Low Earth (SSO)	Earth observation	In orbit	Operational
9 August; 04:11:00	Mission designated "White is the New Black".					
9 August; 05:52:38	(Russia) Soyuz-2.1b / Fregat		(Kazakhstan) Baikonur Site 31/6		(Russia) Roscosmos	
9 August; 05:52:38	(Iran) Khayyam	ISA	Low Earth	Earth observation	In orbit	Operational
9 August; 05:52:38	⚀ (Russia) CubeSX-HSE-2	HSE University	Low Earth	Earth observation	In orbit	Operational
9 August; 05:52:38	⚀ (Russia) CYCLOPS	BSTU	Low Earth	Technology demonstration	In orbit	Operational
9 August; 05:52:38	⚀ (Russia) Geoscan-Edelveis	GeoScan	Low Earth	Technology demonstration	In orbit	Operational
9 August; 05:52:38	⚀ (Russia) ISOI	Samara Medex / RAS	Low Earth	Earth observation	In orbit	Operational
9 August; 05:52:38	⚀ (Russia) KAI-1	KNRTU-KAI	Low Earth	Technology demonstration	In orbit	Operational
9 August; 05:52:38	⚀ (Russia) KODIZ (Monitor-1)	MSU	Low Earth	Radiation research	In orbit	Operational
9 August; 05:52:38	⚀ (Russia) Kuzbass-300	KuzSTU	Low Earth	Earth observation	In orbit	Operational
9 August; 05:52:38	⚀ (Russia) MIET-AIS	MIET	Low Earth	Navigation	In orbit	Operational
9 August; 05:52:38	⚀ (Russia) Polytech Universe-1, 2	SPbPU	Low Earth	Electromagnetic radiation research	In orbit	Operational
9 August; 05:52:38	⚀ (Russia) ReshUCube-1	SibSAU	Low Earth	Magnetospheric research	In orbit	Operational
9 August; 05:52:38	⚀ (Russia) Siren	BelSU	Low Earth	Space farming	In orbit	Operational
9 August; 05:52:38	⚀ (Russia) Skoltech B1, B2	Skoltech	Low Earth	Technology demonstration	In orbit	Operational
9 August; 05:52:38	⚀ (Russia) UTMN	TSU	Low Earth	Earth observation	In orbit	Operational
9 August; 05:52:38	⚀ (Russia) VIZARD-SS1	Gymnasium № 1522 / School № 2086	Low Earth	Navigation	In orbit	Operational
10 August; 02:14:40	(United States) Falcon 9 Block 5	Starlink Group 4-26	(United States) Kennedy LC-39A		(United States) SpaceX	
10 August; 02:14:40	(United States) Starlink × 52	SpaceX	Low Earth	Communications	In orbit	Operational
10 August; 04:50	(China) Long March 6	Y10	(China) Taiyuan LC-16		(China) CASC	
10 August; 04:50	(China) Jilin-1 Gaofen-03D 09, 35–43	Chang Guang Satellite Technology	Low Earth (SSO)	Earth observation	In orbit	Operational
10 August; 04:50	(China) Jilin-1 Hongwai-01A 01–06	Chang Guang Satellite Technology	Low Earth (SSO)	Earth observation	In orbit	Operational
12 August; 21:40:20	(United States) Falcon 9 Block 5	Starlink Group 3-3	(United States) Vandenberg SLC-4E		(United States) SpaceX	
12 August; 21:40:20	(United States) Starlink × 46	SpaceX	Low Earth (SSO)	Communications	In orbit	Operational
19 August; 17:37	(China) Long March 2D	2D-Y66	(China) Xichang LC-3		(China) CASC	
19 August; 17:37	(China) Yaogan 35-04A	CAS	Low Earth	Reconnaissance	In orbit	Operational
19 August; 17:37	(China) Yaogan 35-04B	CAS	Low Earth	Reconnaissance	In orbit	Operational
19 August; 17:37	(China) Yaogan 35-04C	CAS	Low Earth	Reconnaissance	In orbit	Operational
19 August; 17:37	103rd consecutive successful launch of the Long March series rockets, breaking the old record of 102 set between 1996 and 2011.					
19 August; 19:21:20	(United States) Falcon 9 Block 5	Starlink Group 4-27	(United States) Cape Canaveral SLC-40		(United States) SpaceX	
19 August; 19:21:20	(United States) Starlink × 53	SpaceX	Low Earth	Communications	In orbit	Operational
23 August; 02:36	(China) Kuaizhou 1A	Y15	(China) Xichang		(China) ExPace	
23 August; 02:36	(China) Chuangxin-16A	CAS	Low Earth	Technology demonstration	In orbit	Operational
23 August; 02:36	(China) Chuangxin-16B	CAS	Low Earth	Technology demonstration	In orbit	Operational
24 August; 03:01	(China) Long March 2D	2D-Y75	(China) Taiyuan LC-9		(China) CASC	
24 August; 03:01	(China) Beijing-3B	Twenty First Century Aerospace Technology	Low Earth (SSO)	Earth observation	In orbit	Operational
28 August; 03:41:20	(United States) Falcon 9 Block 5	Starlink Group 4-23	(United States) Cape Canaveral SLC-40		(United States) SpaceX	
28 August; 03:41:20	(United States) Starlink × 54	SpaceX	Low Earth	Communications	In orbit	Operational
31 August; 05:40:10	(United States) Falcon 9 Block 5	Starlink Group 3-4	(United States) Vandenberg SLC-4E		(United States) SpaceX	
31 August; 05:40:10	(United States) Starlink × 46	SpaceX	Low Earth (SSO)	Communications	In orbit	Operational
← Jan; Feb; Mar; Apr; May; Jun; Jul; Aug; Sep; Oct; Nov; Dec →; === September ===
2 September; 23:44	(China) Long March 4C	4C-Y52	(China) Jiuquan SLS-2		(China) CASC	
2 September; 23:44	(China) Yaogan 33-02	CAS	Low Earth (SSO)	Earth observation	In orbit	Operational
5 September; 02:09:40	(United States) Falcon 9 Block 5	Starlink Group 4-20	(United States) Cape Canaveral SLC-40		(United States) SpaceX	
5 September; 02:09:40	(United States) Starlink × 51	SpaceX	Low Earth	Communications	In orbit	Operational
5 September; 02:09:40	(United States) SHERPA-LTC2	Spaceflight, Inc.	Low Earth	Space tug	In orbit	Operational
5 September; 02:09:40	SHERPA-LTC2 carried Boeing's Varuna-TDM as a hosted payload.					
6 September; 02:24:30	(China) Kuaizhou 1A	Y16	(China) Jiuquan LS-95A		(China) ExPace	
6 September; 02:24:30	(China) Centispace-1 S3	Beijing Future Navigation Technology	Low Earth	Navigation	In orbit	Operational
6 September; 02:24:30	(China) Centispace-1 S4	Beijing Future Navigation Technology	Low Earth	Navigation	In orbit	Operational
6 September; 04:19	(China) Long March 2D	2D-Y67	(China) Xichang LC-3		(China) CASC	
6 September; 04:19	(China) Yaogan 35-05A	CAS	Low Earth	Reconnaissance	In orbit	Operational
6 September; 04:19	(China) Yaogan 35-05B	CAS	Low Earth	Reconnaissance	In orbit	Operational
6 September; 04:19	(China) Yaogan 35-05C	CAS	Low Earth	Reconnaissance	In orbit	Operational
7 September; 21:45:07	(France) Ariane 5 ECA	VA258	(France) Kourou ELA-3		(France) Arianespace	
7 September; 21:45:07	(France) Eutelsat Konnect VHTS	Eutelsat	Geosynchronous	Communications	In orbit	Operational
11 September; 01:20:00	(United States) Falcon 9 Block 5	Starlink Group 4-2	(United States) Kennedy LC-39A		(United States) SpaceX	
11 September; 01:20:00	(United States) Starlink × 34	SpaceX	Low Earth	Communications	In orbit	Operational
11 September; 01:20:00	(United States) BlueWalker 3	AST SpaceMobile	Low Earth	Communications; Technology demonstration	In orbit	Operational
13 September; 13:18	(China) Long March 7A	7A-Y5	(China) Wenchang LC-2		(China) CASC	
13 September; 13:18	(China) ChinaSat-1E	China Satcom	Geosynchronous	Communications	In orbit	Operational
15 September; 20:38	(United States) Electron	"The Owl Spreads Its Wings"	(New Zealand) Mahia LC-1B		(United States) Rocket Lab	
15 September; 20:38	(Japan) StriX-1	Synspective	Low Earth (SSO)	Earth observation	In orbit	Operational
15 September; 20:38	Third of 16 dedicated launches for Synspective's StriX constellation.					
19 September; 00:18:40	(United States) Falcon 9 Block 5	Starlink Group 4-34	(United States) Cape Canaveral SLC-40		(United States) SpaceX	
19 September; 00:18:40	(United States) Starlink × 54	SpaceX	Low Earth	Communications	In orbit	Operational
20 September; 23:15	(China) Long March 2D	2D-Y76	(China) Jiuquan SLS-2		(China) CASC	
20 September; 23:15	(China) Yunhai-1 03	SAST	Low Earth (SSO)	Meteorology	In orbit	Operational
21 September; 13:54:49	(Russia) Soyuz-2.1a		(Kazakhstan) Baikonur Site 31/6		(Russia) Roscosmos	
21 September; 13:54:49	(Russia) Soyuz MS-22	Roscosmos	Low Earth (ISS)	Expedition 67/68	28 March 2023; 11:46	Successful
24 September; 22:25:30	(United States) Delta IV Heavy	D-387	(United States) Vandenberg SLC-6		(United States) ULA	
24 September; 22:25:30	(United States) USA-338 (KH-11 19)	NRO	Low Earth	Reconnaissance	In orbit	Operational
24 September; 22:25:30	NROL-91 Mission. Final Delta IV launch from Vandenberg.					
24 September; 22:55	(China) Kuaizhou 1A	Y14	(China) Taiyuan		(China) ExPace	
24 September; 22:55	(China) Shiyan 14	CAST	Low Earth (SSO)	Technology demonstration	In orbit	Operational
24 September; 22:55	(China) Shiyan 15	SAST	Low Earth (SSO)	Earth observation	In orbit	Operational
24 September; 23:32:10	(United States) Falcon 9 Block 5	Starlink Group 4-35	(United States) Cape Canaveral SLC-40		(United States) SpaceX	
24 September; 23:32:10	(United States) Starlink × 52	SpaceX	Low Earth	Communications	In orbit	Operational
26 September; 13:38	(China) Long March 2D	2D-Y68	(China) Xichang LC-3		(China) CASC	
26 September; 13:38	(China) Yaogan 36-01A	CAS	Low Earth	Reconnaissance	In orbit	Operational
26 September; 13:38	(China) Yaogan 36-01B	CAS	Low Earth	Reconnaissance	In orbit	Operational
26 September; 13:38	(China) Yaogan 36-01C	CAS	Low Earth	Reconnaissance	In orbit	Operational
26 September; 23:50	(China) Long March 6	Y9	(China) Taiyuan LC-16		(China) CASC	
26 September; 23:50	(China) Shiyan 16A	SAST	Low Earth (SSO)	Technology demonstration	In orbit	Operational
26 September; 23:50	(China) Shiyan 16B	SAST	Low Earth (SSO)	Technology demonstration	In orbit	Operational
26 September; 23:50	(China) Shiyan 17	CAST	Low Earth (SSO)	Technology demonstration	In orbit	Operational
← Jan; Feb; Mar; Apr; May; Jun; Jul; Aug; Sep; Oct; Nov; Dec →; === October ===
1 October; 07:01	(United States) Firefly Alpha	FLTA002	(United States) Vandenberg SLC-2W		(United States) Firefly / ALS	
1 October; 07:01	⚀ (United States) TechEdSat-15 (TES-15)	NASA Ames / SJSU	Low Earth (Retrograde)	Technology demonstration	5 October	Partial success
1 October; 07:01	⚀ (United States) TIS Serenity	Teachers in Space, Inc.	Low Earth (Retrograde)	Education	12 October	Partial success
1 October; 07:01	▫ (Spain) FOSSASAT-1B	FOSSA Systems	Low Earth (Retrograde)	LoRa technology demonstration	5 October	Partial success
1 October; 07:01	▫ (Spain) GENESIS-G/ASTROLAND-1	AMSAT-EA	Low Earth (Retrograde)	Amateur radio	5 October	Partial success
1 October; 07:01	▫ (Spain) GENESIS-J/ASTROLAND-2	AMSAT-EA	Low Earth (Retrograde)	Amateur radio	5 October	Partial success
1 October; 07:01	▫ (Greece) QUBIK-3	Libre Space Foundation	Low Earth (Retrograde)	Technology demonstration	5 October	Partial success
1 October; 07:01	▫ (Greece) QUBIK-4	Libre Space Foundation	Low Earth (Retrograde)	Technology demonstration	5 October	Partial success
1 October; 07:01	"To The Black". Second orbital launch attempt, reflying several payloads lost in the previous launch attempt. Libre Space Foundation's PicoBus deployed 5 PocketQubes. First partially successful flight of the Firefly Alpha launch vehicle. All satellites were deployed; however, due to a lower-than-intended deployment orbit, most of the satellites re-entered before reaching their intended design life within a week after launch.					
4 October; 21:36:00	(United States) Atlas V 531	AV-099	(United States) Cape Canaveral SLC-41		(United States) ULA	
4 October; 21:36:00	(Luxembourg) SES-20	SES S.A.	Geosynchronous	Communications	In orbit	Operational
4 October; 21:36:00	(Luxembourg) SES-21	SES S.A.	Geosynchronous	Communications	In orbit	Operational
4 October; 21:36:00	Final flight of Atlas V 531 configuration.					
5 October; 16:00:57	(United States) Falcon 9 Block 5	F9-178	(United States) Kennedy LC-39A		(United States) SpaceX	
5 October; 16:00:57	(United States) SpaceX Crew-5	SpaceX / NASA	Low Earth (ISS)	Expedition 68/69	12 March 2023; 02:02	Successful
5 October; 16:00:57	Fifth operational Crew Dragon mission to the ISS for NASA.					
5 October; 23:10:30	(United States) Falcon 9 Block 5	Starlink Group 4-29	(United States) Vandenberg SLC-4E		(United States) SpaceX	
5 October; 23:10:30	(United States) Starlink × 52	SpaceX	Low Earth	Communications	In orbit	Operational
7 October; 13:10	(China) Long March 11H	Y4	(China) Sea Launch Platform, Yellow Sea		(China) CASC	
7 October; 13:10	(China) Centispace-1 S5	Beijing Future Navigation Technology	Low Earth	Navigation	In orbit	Operational
7 October; 13:10	(China) Centispace-1 S6	Beijing Future Navigation Technology	Low Earth	Navigation	In orbit	Operational
7 October; 17:09:21	(United States) Electron	"It Argos Up From Here"	(New Zealand) Mahia LC-1B		(United States) Rocket Lab	
7 October; 17:09:21	(United States) (France) GAzelle (Argos-4)	NOAA / CNES	Low Earth (SSO)	Communications	In orbit	Operational
7 October; 17:09:21	Orbital Test Bed (OTB) satellite carrying the Argos-4 Advanced Data Collection System (A-DCS) hosted payload.					
8 October; 23:05:00	(United States) Falcon 9 Block 5	F9-180	(United States) Cape Canaveral SLC-40		(United States) SpaceX	
8 October; 23:05:00	(United States) Galaxy 33	Intelsat	Geosynchronous	Communications	In orbit	Operational
8 October; 23:05:00	(United States) Galaxy 34	Intelsat	Geosynchronous	Communications	In orbit	Operational
8 October; 23:05:00	Galaxy 33 will replace Galaxy 15, which was decommissioned on 31 August 2022. Galaxy 34 will replace Galaxy 12.					
8 October; 23:43	(China) Long March 2D	2D-Y55	(China) Jiuquan SLS-2		(China) CASC	
8 October; 23:43	(China) ASO-S (Kuafu-1)	CAS	Low Earth (SSO)	Space weather forecasting	In orbit	Operational
8 October; 23:43	Advanced Space-based Solar Observatory (ASO-S). Part of China's Kuafu project.					
10 October; 02:52:32	(Russia) Soyuz-2.1b / Fregat		(Russia) Plesetsk Site 43/3		(Russia) RVSN RF	
10 October; 02:52:32	(Russia) GLONASS-K 17L (K1 №5)	VKS	Medium Earth	Navigation	In orbit	Operational
12 October; 00:50:43	(Japan) Epsilon	Epsilon-6	(Japan) Uchinoura LP-Mu		(Japan) JAXA	
12 October; 00:50:43	(Japan) AMATERU-I (QPS-SAR-3)	iQPS	Low Earth	Earth observation	12 October	Launch failure
12 October; 00:50:43	(Japan) AMATERU-II (QPS-SAR-4)	iQPS	Low Earth	Earth observation	12 October	Launch failure
12 October; 00:50:43	(Japan) RAISE-3	JAXA	Low Earth	Technology demonstration	12 October	Launch failure
12 October; 00:50:43	⚀ (Japan) FSI-SAT	Future Science Institute	Low Earth	Technology demonstration	12 October	Launch failure
12 October; 00:50:43	⚀ (Japan) KOSEN-2	Yonago College	Low Earth	Technology demonstration	12 October	Launch failure
12 October; 00:50:43	⚀ (Japan) MAGNARO	Nagoya University	Low Earth	Technology demonstration	12 October	Launch failure
12 October; 00:50:43	⚀ (Japan) MITSUBA	Kyushu Institute of Technology	Low Earth	Technology demonstration	12 October	Launch failure
12 October; 00:50:43	⚀ (Japan) WASEDA-SAT-ZERO	Waseda University	Low Earth	Technology demonstration	12 October	Launch failure
12 October; 00:50:43	Innovative Satellite Technology Demonstration-3 mission, carrying 8 satellites.					
12 October; 15:00:00	(Russia) Proton-M / DM-03		(Kazakhstan) Baikonur Site 81/24		(Russia) Roscosmos	
12 October; 15:00:00	(Angola) AngoSat-2	GGPEN	Geosynchronous	Communications	In orbit	Operational
12 October; 15:00:00	Replacement for AngoSat 1, which failed shortly after launch in 2017.					
12 October; 22:53	(China) Long March 2C	2C-Y66	(China) Taiyuan LC-9		(China) CASC	
12 October; 22:53	(China) S-SAR 01 (Huanjing-2E)	Ministry of Emergency Management	Low Earth (SSO)	Earth observation	In orbit	Operational
14 October; 19:12	(China) Long March 2D	2D-Y69	(China) Xichang LC-3		(China) CASC	
14 October; 19:12	(China) Yaogan 36-02A	CAS	Low Earth	Reconnaissance	In orbit	Operational
14 October; 19:12	(China) Yaogan 36-02B	CAS	Low Earth	Reconnaissance	In orbit	Operational
14 October; 19:12	(China) Yaogan 36-02C	CAS	Low Earth	Reconnaissance	In orbit	Operational
15 October; 05:22	(United States) Falcon 9 Block 5	F9-181	(United States) Cape Canaveral SLC-40		(United States) SpaceX	
15 October; 05:22	(France) Hotbird 13F	Eutelsat	Geosynchronous	Communications	In orbit	Operational
15 October; 05:22	The first stage carried two Adidas Al Rihla balls that were later delivered to officials at the 2022 FIFA World Cup in Qatar.					
15 October; 19:55:15	(Russia) Angara 1.2		(Russia) Plesetsk Site 35/1		(Russia) Roscosmos	
15 October; 19:55:15	(Russia) EO MKA №3 (Kosmos 2560)	VKS	Low Earth (SSO)	Technology demonstration	10 December; 01:54	Successful
20 October; 14:50:40	(United States) Falcon 9 Block 5	Starlink Group 4-36	(United States) Cape Canaveral SLC-40		(United States) SpaceX	
20 October; 14:50:40	(United States) Starlink × 54	SpaceX	Low Earth	Communications	In orbit	Operational
21 October; 19:20:15	(Russia) Soyuz-2.1v / Volga		(Russia) Plesetsk Site 43/4		(Russia) Roscosmos	
21 October; 19:20:15	(Russia) MKA №1 (Kosmos 2561)	VKS	Low Earth (SSO)	Military	In orbit	Operational
21 October; 19:20:15	(Russia) MKA №2 (Kosmos 2562)	VKS	Low Earth (SSO)	Military	8 November 2023	Successful
22 October; 18:37	(India) LVM 3	M2	(India) Satish Dhawan SLP		(India) NSIL	
22 October; 18:37	(United Kingdom) OneWeb × 36	OneWeb	Low Earth	Communications	In orbit	Operational
22 October; 18:37	First commercial LVM 3 (GSLV Mk. III) launch. Heaviest payload launched to date by ISRO at 5,796 kg (12,778 lb).					
22 October; 19:57:09	(Russia) Soyuz-2.1b / Fregat		(Russia) Vostochny Site 1S		(Russia) Roscosmos	
22 October; 19:57:09	(Russia) Gonets-M 23 (33L)	Gonets Satellite System	Low Earth	Communications	In orbit	Operational
22 October; 19:57:09	(Russia) Gonets-M 24 (34L)	Gonets Satellite System	Low Earth	Communications	In orbit	Operational
22 October; 19:57:09	(Russia) Gonets-M 25 (35L)	Gonets Satellite System	Low Earth	Communications	In orbit	Operational
22 October; 19:57:09	(Russia) Skif-D	Roscosmos	Medium Earth (Polar)	Technology demonstration	In orbit	Operational
22 October; 19:57:09	Skif-D is a demonstrator satellite for the Sfera constellation.					
26 October; 00:20:09	(Russia) Soyuz-2.1a		(Kazakhstan) Baikonur Site 31/6		(Russia) Roscosmos	
26 October; 00:20:09	(Russia) Progress MS-21 / 82P	Roscosmos	Low Earth (ISS)	ISS logistics	19 February 2023; 03:15	Successful
28 October; 01:14:10	(United States) Falcon 9 Block 5	Starlink Group 4-31	(United States) Vandenberg SLC-4E		(United States) SpaceX	
28 October; 01:14:10	(United States) Starlink × 53	SpaceX	Low Earth	Communications	In orbit	Operational
28 October; 01:14:10	Last launch of Starlink Group 4 Satellites from Vandenberg.					
29 October; 01:01	(China) Long March 2D	2D-Y72	(China) Jiuquan SLS-2		(China) CASC	
29 October; 01:01	(China) Shiyan-20C	CAST	Low Earth	Technology demonstration	In orbit	Operational
31 October; 07:37:23	(China) Long March 5B	Y4	(China) Wenchang LC-1		(China) CASC	
31 October; 07:37:23	(China) Mengtian	CMSA	Low Earth (TSS)	Space station assembly	In orbit	Operational
31 October; 07:37:23	Mengtian is the second Laboratory Cabin Module of the Tiangong space station.					
← Jan; Feb; Mar; Apr; May; Jun; Jul; Aug; Sep; Oct; Nov; Dec →; === November ===
1 November; 13:41	(United States) Falcon Heavy	FH-004	(United States) Kennedy LC-39A		(United States) SpaceX	
1 November; 13:41	(United States) LDPE-2 (ROOSTER-2)	United States Space Force	Geosynchronous	Space tug	In orbit	Operational
1 November; 13:41	(United States) Shepherd Demonstration (USA-339)	United States Space Force	Geosynchronous	Technology demonstration	In orbit	Operational
1 November; 13:41	⚀ (United States) Alpine (USA-341)	Millennium Space Systems	Geosynchronous	Technology demonstration	In orbit	Operational
1 November; 13:41	⚀ (United States) LINUSS Chase (LINUS-A1)	Lockheed Martin Space	Geosynchronous	Satellite servicing Technology demonstration	In orbit	Operational
1 November; 13:41	⚀ (United States) LINUSS RSO (LINUS-A2)	Lockheed Martin Space	Geosynchronous	Satellite servicing Technology demonstration	In orbit	Operational
1 November; 13:41	⚀ (United States) TETRA-1 (USA-340)	United States Space Force	Geosynchronous	Technology demonstration	In orbit	Successful
1 November; 13:41	⚀ (United States) USUVL (USA-344)	United States Space Force	Geosynchronous	Technology demonstration	In orbit	Operational
1 November; 13:41	⚀ (United States) USA-399	United States Space Force	Geosynchronous	Technology demonstration	In orbit	Operational
1 November; 13:41	⚀ (United States) USA-546	United States Space Force	Geosynchronous	Technology demonstration	In orbit	Operational
1 November; 13:41	⚀ (United States) USA-547	United States Space Force	Geosynchronous	Technology demonstration	In orbit	Operational
1 November; 13:41	⚀ (United States) USA-548	United States Space Force	Geosynchronous	Technology demonstration	In orbit	Operational
1 November; 13:41	⚀ (United States) USA-551	United States Space Force	Geosynchronous	Technology demonstration	In orbit	Operational
1 November; 13:41	⚀ (United States) USA-552	United States Space Force	Geosynchronous	Technology demonstration	In orbit	Operational
1 November; 13:41	⚀ (United States) USA-553	United States Space Force	Geosynchronous	Technology demonstration	In orbit	Operational
1 November; 13:41	⚀ (United States) USA-556	United States Space Force	Geosynchronous	Technology demonstration	In orbit	Operational
1 November; 13:41	⚀ (United States) USA-557	United States Space Force	Geosynchronous	Technology demonstration	In orbit	Operational
1 November; 13:41	USSF-44 mission, carrying two primary payloads and multiple CubeSats. LDPE-2 hosts multiple payloads, including Mustang, a small size/weight/power communications experiment; Xenon, a commercial off-the-shelf component maturation for flight at GEO; and Energetic Charged Particle-Lite, an SSC space weather sensor. The USUVL cubesat separated from an unknown spacecraft on 9 January 2023. USA-399 separated from LDPE-2 in August 2024. USA-546 to USA-557 separated between May and September 2025.					
2 November; 06:47:48	(Russia) Soyuz-2.1b / Fregat		(Russia) Plesetsk Site 43/4		(Russia) RVSN RF	
2 November; 06:47:48	(Russia) EKS-6 (Tundra 16L, Kosmos 2563)	Ministry of Defence	Tundra	Early warning	In orbit	Operational
3 November; 05:22	(United States) Falcon 9 Block 5	F9-184	(United States) Cape Canaveral SLC-40		(United States) SpaceX	
3 November; 05:22	(France) Hotbird 13G	Eutelsat	Geosynchronous	Communications	In orbit	Operational
4 November; 17:27	(United States) Electron	"Catch Me If You Can"	(New Zealand) Mahia LC-1B		(United States) Rocket Lab	
4 November; 17:27	(Sweden) MATS	SNSA	Low Earth (SSO)	Gravity wave observation	In orbit	Operational
4 November; 17:27	First-stage mid-air catch was not achieved due to a telemetry drop out during reentry.					
5 November; 11:50	(China) Long March 3B/E	3B-Y91	(China) Xichang LC-2		(China) CASC	
5 November; 11:50	(China) ChinaSat-19	China Satcom	Geosynchronous	Communications	In orbit	Operational
7 November; 10:32:42	(United States) Antares 230+		(United States) MARS LP-0A		(United States) Northrop Grumman	
7 November; 10:32:42	(United States) Cygnus NG-18; S.S. Sally Ride	NASA	Low Earth (ISS)	ISS logistics	22 April 2023; 03:12	Successful
7 November; 10:32:42	⚀ (Uganda) PearlAfricaSat-1	Uganda	Low Earth	Earth observation	In orbit	Operational
7 November; 10:32:42	⚀ (Japan) SpaceTuna1	Kindai University	Low Earth	Technology demonstration	In orbit	Operational
7 November; 10:32:42	⚀ (Japan) TAKA	Kyushu Institute of Technology	Low Earth	Earth observation	In orbit	Operational
7 November; 10:32:42	⚀ (Zimbabwe) ZIMSAT-1	Zimbabwe	Low Earth	Earth observation	In orbit	Operational
7 November; 10:32:42	PearlAfricaSat-1 and ZIMSAT-1, the first Ugandan and Zimbabwean satellites respectively, were launched together with TAKA as part of the BIRDS-5 Project. PearlAfricaSat-1, TAKA, ZIMSAT-1, and SpaceTuna1 were deployed into orbit from the ISS on 2 December 2022.					
10 November; 09:49:00	(United States) Atlas V 401	AV-098	(United States) Vandenberg SLC-3E		(United States) ULA	
10 November; 09:49:00	(United States) NOAA-21 (JPSS-2)	NOAA	Low Earth (SSO)	Meteorology	In orbit	Operational
10 November; 09:49:00	(United States) LOFTID	NASA Langley / ULA	Low Earth to Suborbital	Technology demonstration	10 November; 12:02	Successful
10 November; 09:49:00	Final Atlas V launch from Vandenberg. Final flight of Atlas V 401 configuration and final Atlas V flight with the four meter fairing overall. LOFTID entered orbit with JPSS-2 and was de-orbited after JPSS-2 deployment, re-entering and splashing down southeast of Hawaii.					
11 November; 22:52	(China) Long March 6A	6A-Y2	(China) Taiyuan LC-9A		(China) CASC	
11 November; 22:52	(China) Yunhai-3 01	SAST	Low Earth (SSO)	Meteorology	In orbit	Operational
11 November; 22:52	Second stage broke up into over 50 debris pieces following spacecraft deployment.					
12 November; 02:03:12	(China) Long March 7	7-Y6	(China) Wenchang LC-2		(China) CASC	
12 November; 02:03:12	(China) Tianzhou 5	CMSA	Low Earth (TSS)	Space logistics	12 September 2023; 01:13	Successful
12 November; 02:03:12	⚀ (China) Gaoxin-1	TBA	Low Earth	Earth observation	In orbit	Operational
12 November; 02:03:12	⚀ (China) Macao Student Science 1 (CAS-10, XW-4)	MUST / CAMSAT	Low Earth	Amateur radio Education	15 March 2023	Successful
12 November; 02:03:12	⚀ (China) Shengxi Jishu Yanzheng	TBA	Low Earth	Technology demonstration	In orbit	Operational
12 November; 02:03:12	Cargo flight to the Tiangong space station. At least five rideshare payloads are manifested on this flight.					
12 November; 16:06:00	(United States) Falcon 9 Block 5	F9-185	(United States) Cape Canaveral SLC-40		(United States) SpaceX	
12 November; 16:06:00	(United States) Galaxy 31	Intelsat	Geosynchronous	Communications	In orbit	Operational
12 November; 16:06:00	(United States) Galaxy 32	Intelsat	Geosynchronous	Communications	In orbit	Operational
15 November; 01:38	(China) Long March 4C	4C-Y48	(China) Jiuquan SLS-2		(China) CASC	
15 November; 01:38	(China) Yaogan 34-03	CAS	Low Earth	Earth observation	In orbit	Operational
16 November; 06:19:59	(China) Ceres-1	Y4	(China) Jiuquan LS-95A		(China) Galactic Energy	
16 November; 06:19:59	(China) Jilin-1 Gaofen-03D 08, 51–54	Chang Guang Satellite Technology	Low Earth (SSO)	Earth observation	In orbit	Operational
16 November; 06:19:59	Mission designated "Young for You".					
16 November; 06:47:44	(United States) SLS Block 1		(United States) Kennedy LC-39B		(United States) NASA	
16 November; 06:47:44	(United States) Artemis 1	NASA	Selenocentric (DRO)	Technology demonstration	11 December; 17:40:30	Successful
16 November; 06:47:44	⚀ (Italy) ArgoMoon	ASI	Heliocentric	Technology demonstration	In orbit	Successful
16 November; 06:47:44	⚀ (United States) BioSentinel	NASA	Heliocentric	Astrobiology	In orbit	Successful
16 November; 06:47:44	⚀ (United States) CuSP	NASA	Heliocentric	Space weather	In orbit	Spacecraft failure
16 November; 06:47:44	⚀ (Japan) EQUULEUS	University of Tokyo	Earth–Moon L_{2}	Earth observation	In orbit	Successful
16 November; 06:47:44	⚀ (United States) LunaH-Map	NASA	Selenocentric	Lunar orbiter	In orbit	Spacecraft failure
16 November; 06:47:44	⚀ (United States) Lunar IceCube	NASA	Selenocentric	Lunar orbiter	In orbit	Spacecraft failure
16 November; 06:47:44	⚀ (United States) LunIR	Lockheed Martin Space	Heliocentric	Technology demonstration	In orbit	Spacecraft failure
16 November; 06:47:44	⚀ (United States) Near-Earth Asteroid Scout	NASA	Heliocentric	Technology demonstration	In orbit	Spacecraft failure
16 November; 06:47:44	⚀ (Japan) OMOTENASHI	JAXA	Selenocentric	Lunar lander	In orbit	Spacecraft failure
16 November; 06:47:44	⚀ (United States) Team Miles	Fluid & Reason	Heliocentric	Technology demonstration	In orbit	Spacecraft failure
16 November; 06:47:44	Maiden flight of NASA's Space Launch System (SLS), carrying an Orion spacecraft for the Artemis 1 mission. 10 CubeSats were deployed within eight hours after launch.					
23 November; 02:57	(United States) Falcon 9 Block 5	F9-186	(United States) Cape Canaveral SLC-40		(United States) SpaceX	
23 November; 02:57	(France) Eutelsat 10B	Eutelsat	Geosynchronous	Communications	In orbit	Operational
26 November; 06:26	(India) PSLV-XL	C54	(India) Satish Dhawan FLP		(India) ISRO	
26 November; 06:26	(India) EOS-06 (Oceansat-3)	ISRO	Low Earth (SSO)	Oceanography	In orbit	Operational
26 November; 06:26	⚀ (India) Anand (Pixxel-TD 1)	Pixxel	Low Earth (SSO)	Earth observation	In orbit	Operational
26 November; 06:26	⚀ (Switzerland) Astrocast × 4	Astrocast SA	Low Earth (SSO)	IoT	In orbit	Operational
26 November; 06:26	⚀ (Bhutan) (India) BhutanSat (INS-2B)	Bhutan DITT / ISRO	Low Earth (SSO)	Technology demonstration	In orbit	Operational
26 November; 06:26	⚀ (India) Thybolt 1, 2	Dhruva Space	Low Earth (SSO)	Technology demonstration	In orbit	Operational
26 November; 19:20:43	(United States) Falcon 9 Block 5	F9-187	(United States) Kennedy LC-39A		(United States) SpaceX	
26 November; 19:20:43	(United States) SpaceX CRS-26	NASA	Low Earth (ISS)	ISS logistics	11 January 2023; 10:19	Successful
26 November; 19:20:43	⚀ (Italy) DanteSat	NPC Spacemind	Low Earth	Technology demonstration	7 February 2023	Successful
26 November; 19:20:43	⚀ (Japan) HSKSAT	HSK-SAT	Low Earth	Technology demonstration	In orbit	Operational
26 November; 19:20:43	⚀ (Canada) LORIS	Dalhousie University	Low Earth	Education	In orbit	Operational
26 November; 19:20:43	⚀ (United States) MARIO	University of Michigan	Low Earth	Technology demonstration	In orbit	Operational
26 November; 19:20:43	⚀ (Taiwan) NUTSat	NFU / NSPO	Low Earth	Technology demonstration	1 April 2023	
26 November; 19:20:43	⚀ (Japan) OPTIMAL-1	ArkEdge Space / University of Fukui	Low Earth	Technology demonstration	In orbit	Operational
26 November; 19:20:43	⚀ (Canada) ORCASat	University of Victoria	Low Earth	Adaptive optics calibration	11 July 2023	Successful
26 November; 19:20:43	⚀ (United States) petitSat	NASA Goddard	Low Earth	Ionospheric research	In orbit	Operational
26 November; 19:20:43	⚀ (United States) (Brazil) SPORT	NASA Marshall / INPE / ITA	Low Earth	Technology demonstration	In orbit	Operational
26 November; 19:20:43	⚀ (Indonesia) SS-1	Surya University	Low Earth	Education	In orbit	Operational
26 November; 19:20:43	⚀ (United States) TJREVERB	TJHSST	Low Earth	Technology demonstration	In orbit	Operational
26 November; 19:20:43	Eleven CubeSats were delivered on this mission, including four satellites for the ELaNa 49 mission. SS-1, OPTIMAL-1, and HSKSAT were deployed into orbit from the ISS on 6 January 2023.					
27 November; 12:23	(China) Long March 2D	2D-Y89	(China) Xichang LC-3		(China) CASC	
27 November; 12:23	(China) Yaogan 36-03A	CAS	Low Earth	Reconnaissance	In orbit	Operational
27 November; 12:23	(China) Yaogan 36-03B	CAS	Low Earth	Reconnaissance	In orbit	Operational
27 November; 12:23	(China) Yaogan 36-03C	CAS	Low Earth	Reconnaissance	In orbit	Operational
28 November; 15:13:50	(Russia) Soyuz-2.1b / Fregat		(Russia) Plesetsk Site 43/3		(Russia) RVSN RF	
28 November; 15:13:50	(Russia) GLONASS-M 761	VKS	Medium Earth	Navigation	In orbit	Operational
29 November; 15:08:17	(China) Long March 2F/G	Y15	(China) Jiuquan SLS-1		(China) CASC	
29 November; 15:08:17	(China) Shenzhou 15	CMSA	Low Earth (TSS)	Crewed spaceflight	3 June 2023; 22:33	Successful
29 November; 15:08:17	Fourth crewed flight to the Tiangong space station. The first Chinese crew handover in space will be performed between the crews of Shenzhou 14 and Shenzhou 15 onboard the TSS.					
30 November; 21:10:25	(Russia) Soyuz-2.1b		(Russia) Plesetsk Site 43/4		(Russia) RVSN RF	
30 November; 21:10:25	(Russia) Lotos-S1 №6 (Kosmos 2565)	Ministry of Defence	Low Earth	ELINT	In orbit	Operational
30 November; 21:10:25	(Russia) Kosmos 2566	Ministry of Defence	Low Earth		In orbit	Operational
30 November; 21:10:25	Kosmos 2566 was released by the Lotos-S1 satellite on 3 December 2022. A third object has been released from Kosmos 2566 on 24 December 2022 but as of September 2023 it remains unclear if it's an actual spacecraft or a piece of debris.					
← Jan; Feb; Mar; Apr; May; Jun; Jul; Aug; Sep; Oct; Nov; Dec →; === December ===
7 December; 01:15	(China) Kuaizhou 11	Y2	(China) Jiuquan LS-95A		(China) ExPace	
7 December; 01:15	(China) Xingyun Jiaotong VDES	Xingyun Satellite	Low Earth (SSO)	Technology demonstration	In orbit	Operational
7 December; 01:15	Return to flight for the Kuaizhou 11 after the July 2020 launch failure.					
8 December; 18:31	(China) Long March 2D	2D-Y45	(China) Taiyuan LC-9		(China) CASC	
8 December; 18:31	(China) Gaofen 5-01A	CNSA	Low Earth (SSO)	Earth observation	In orbit	Operational
8 December; 22:27:48	(United States) Falcon 9 Block 5	F9-188	(United States) Kennedy LC-39A		(United States) SpaceX	
8 December; 22:27:48	(United Kingdom) OneWeb × 40	OneWeb	Low Earth	Communications	In orbit	Operational
8 December; 22:27:48	OneWeb #15. First launch of OneWeb satellites by SpaceX.					
9 December; 06:35:02	(China) Jielong 3	Y1	(China) Tai Rui Launch Platform, Yellow Sea		China Rocket	
9 December; 06:35:02	(China) Huoju-1 (Torch-1)	Rocket Pi	Low Earth (SSO)	Astrobiology	In orbit	Operational
9 December; 06:35:02	(China) Jiaotong-5 (HEAD-2H)	HEAD Aerospace	Low Earth (SSO)	AIS ship tracking	In orbit	Operational
9 December; 06:35:02	(China) Jilin-1 Gaofen-03D 44–50	Chang Guang Satellite Technology	Low Earth (SSO)	Earth observation	In orbit	Operational
9 December; 06:35:02	(China) Jilin-1 Pingtai-01A 01	Chang Guang Satellite Technology	Low Earth (SSO)	Earth observation Communications	In orbit	Operational
9 December; 06:35:02	⚀ (China) Fengtai Shaonian-2 (CAS-5A)	Fengtai District secondary schools	Low Earth (SSO)	Education	In orbit	Operational
9 December; 06:35:02	⚀ (China) Golden Bauhinia-1 05	Hong Kong Aerospace Science & Technology	Low Earth (SSO)	Earth observation	In orbit	Operational
9 December; 06:35:02	⚀ (China) Golden Bauhinia-1 06	Hong Kong Aerospace Science & Technology	Low Earth (SSO)	Earth observation	In orbit	Operational
9 December; 06:35:02	⚀ (China) Tianqi-7	Guodian Gaoke	Low Earth (SSO)	IoT	In orbit	Operational
9 December; 06:35:02	Maiden flight of Jielong 3, also known as Smart Dragon 3 (SD-3).					
11 December; 07:38:13	(United States) Falcon 9 Block 5	F9-189	(United States) Cape Canaveral SLC-40		(United States) SpaceX	
11 December; 07:38:13	(Japan) Hakuto-R Mission 1	ispace	TLI to lunar surface	Lunar lander	25 April 2023; 16:40	Landing failure
11 December; 07:38:13	(United Arab Emirates) Rashid	UAESA / MBRSC	TLI to lunar surface	Lunar rover	25 April 2023; 16:40	Landing failure
11 December; 07:38:13	(Japan) SORA-Q	Tomy / JAXA / Doshisha University	TLI to lunar surface	Lunar rover	25 April 2023; 16:40	Landing failure
11 December; 07:38:13	⚀ (United States) Lunar Flashlight	NASA	Selenocentric	Lunar orbiter	In orbit	Spacecraft failure
11 December; 07:38:13	Hakuto-R Mission 1 carries the Emirates Lunar Mission.					
12 December; 08:22	(China) Long March 4C	4C-Y57	(China) Jiuquan SLS-2		(China) CASC	
12 December; 08:22	(China) Shiyan-20A	CAST	Low Earth	Technology demonstration	In orbit	Operational
12 December; 08:22	(China) Shiyan-20B	SAST	Low Earth	Technology demonstration	In orbit	Operational
13 December; 20:30:07	(France) Ariane 5 ECA	VA259	(France) Kourou ELA-3		(France) Arianespace	
13 December; 20:30:07	(United States) Galaxy 35	Intelsat	Geosynchronous	Communications	In orbit	Operational
13 December; 20:30:07	(United States) Galaxy 36	Intelsat	Geosynchronous	Communications	In orbit	Operational
13 December; 20:30:07	MTG-I1	EUMETSAT	Geosynchronous	Meteorology	In orbit	Operational
14 December; 08:30:25	(China) Zhuque-2	Y1	(China) Jiuquan LS-96		(China) LandSpace	
14 December; 08:30:25	(China) 14 rideshare payloads	Multiple organizations	Low Earth	Multiple functions	14 December	Launch failure
14 December; 08:30:25	Maiden flight of Zhuque-2, LandSpace's first liquid-propellant rocket. Launch failure caused by an earlier-than-intended shutdown of the vernier engines of the second stage, preventing it from reaching orbital velocity.					
14 December; 18:25	(China) Long March 2D	2D-Y80	(China) Xichang LC-3		(China) CASC	
14 December; 18:25	(China) Yaogan 36-04A	CAS	Low Earth	Reconnaissance	In orbit	Operational
14 December; 18:25	(China) Yaogan 36-04B	CAS	Low Earth	Reconnaissance	In orbit	Operational
14 December; 18:25	(China) Yaogan 36-04C	CAS	Low Earth	Reconnaissance	In orbit	Operational
16 December; 06:17	(China) Long March 11	Y12	(China) Xichang		(China) CASC	
16 December; 06:17	(China) Shiyan-21	SAST	Low Earth	Technology demonstration	In orbit	Operational
16 December; 11:46:47	(United States) Falcon 9 Block 5	F9-190	(United States) Vandenberg SLC-4E		(United States) SpaceX	
16 December; 11:46:47	(United States) (France) SWOT	NASA / CNES	Low Earth	Earth observation	In orbit	Operational
16 December; 22:48	(United States) Falcon 9 Block 5	F9-191	(United States) Cape Canaveral SLC-40		(United States) SpaceX	
16 December; 22:48	(Luxembourg) O3b mPOWER 1 (O3b FM21)	SES S.A.	Medium Earth	Communications	In orbit	Operational
16 December; 22:48	(Luxembourg) O3b mPOWER 2 (O3b FM22)	SES S.A.	Medium Earth	Communications	In orbit	Operational
17 December; 21:32:30	(United States) Falcon 9 Block 5	Starlink Group 4-37	(United States) Kennedy LC-39A		(United States) SpaceX	
17 December; 21:32:30	(United States) Starlink × 54	SpaceX	Low Earth	Communications	In orbit	Operational
17 December; 21:32:30	Last launch of Starlink Group 4 Satellites from Cape Canaveral.					
21 December; 01:47:31	(Italy) Vega-C	VV22	(France) Kourou ELV		(France) Arianespace	
21 December; 01:47:31	(France) Pléiades Neo 5	Airbus Defence and Space	Low Earth (SSO)	Earth observation	21 December	Launch failure
21 December; 01:47:31	(France) Pléiades Neo 6	Airbus Defence and Space	Low Earth (SSO)	Earth observation	21 December	Launch failure
21 December; 01:47:31	The Zefiro 40 second stage deviated from its intended trajectory following a loss of pressure, resulting in reentry about 917 km (570 mi) north of the launch site over the Atlantic.					
27 December; 07:37	(China) Long March 4B	4B-Y55	(China) Taiyuan LC-9		(China) CASC	
27 December; 07:37	(China) Gaofen 11-04	CNSA	Low Earth (SSO)	Earth observation	In orbit	Operational
28 December; 09:34	(United States) Falcon 9 Block 5	Starlink Group 5-1	(United States) Cape Canaveral SLC-40		(United States) SpaceX	
28 December; 09:34	(United States) Starlink × 54	SpaceX	Low Earth (SSO)	Communications	In orbit	Operational
28 December; 09:34	First launch for Shell 5 of the Starlink constellation, and the first launch of Starlink Gen 2 satellites. First launch of Starlink Group 5 Satellites from Cape Canaveral.					
29 December; 04:43	(China) Long March 3B/E	3B-Y88	(China) Xichang LC-2		(China) CASC	
29 December; 04:43	(China) Shiyan 10-02	SAST	Highly elliptical	Technology demonstration	In orbit	Operational
30 December; 07:38	(United States) Falcon 9 Block 5	F9-194	(United States) Vandenberg SLC-4E		(United States) SpaceX	
30 December; 07:38	(Israel) EROS-C3	ImageSat	Low Earth (Retrograde)	Earth observation	In orbit	Operational
30 December; 07:38	This was the first SpaceX orbital launch to target a non-Sun-synchronous retrograde orbit.					
← Jan; Feb; Mar; Apr; May; Jun; Jul; Aug; Sep; Oct; Nov; Dec →

== Suborbital flights ==
Date and time (UTC)	Rocket	Flight number	Launch site		LSP	
Date and time (UTC)	Payload (⚀ = CubeSat)	Operator	Orbit	Function	Decay (UTC)	Outcome
Date and time (UTC)	Remarks					
6 July; 13:47	(Canada) Black Brant IX	SISTINE III	(Australia) Arnhem Space Centre		(United States) NASA	
6 July; 13:47	(United States) SISTINE	CU Boulder	Suborbital	UV spectroscopy	6 July	Successful
6 July; 13:47	Apogee: 151 mi (243 km).					
7 July; 06:01	(United States) Minotaur II+		(United States) Vandenberg TP-01		(United States) Northrop Grumman	
7 July; 06:01	(United States) Mk21A reentry vehicle	AFNWC	Suborbital	Technology demonstration	7 July	Launch failure
7 July; 06:01	Reentry vehicle demonstration for the future LGM-35A Sentinel intercontinental ballistic missile. Rocket exploded 11 seconds after launch.					
11 July; 11:01	(Canada) Black Brant IX		(Australia) Arnhem Space Centre		(United States) NASA	
11 July; 11:01	(United States) DEUCE	CU Boulder	Suborbital	Ultraviolet astronomy	11 July	Successful
11 July; 11:01	Fourth DEUCE launch following flights in 2017, 2018, and 2020. Apogee: 162 mi (261 km).					
12 July	(United States) AGM-183 ARRW	Flight-3	(United States) Boeing B-52 Stratofortress		United States Air Force	
12 July	(United States)	United States Air Force	Suborbital	Missile test	12 July	Successful
23 July; 20:00:00	(Japan) S-520	S-520-RD1	(Japan) Uchinoura LP-KS		(Japan) JAXA	
23 July; 20:00:00	(Japan)	JAXA	Suborbital	Flight test	23 July; 20:06:52	Successful
23 July; 20:00:00	Supersonic combustion flight test. Apogee: 168 km (104 mi).					
4 August; 05:56–09:00	(China) DF-15		(China)		(China) PLA	
4 August; 05:56–09:00	(China)		Suborbital	Missile test	4 August	Successful
4 August; 05:56–09:00	11 missiles launched. 1 of 11. Apogee: ~200 km (120 mi).					
4 August; 05:56–09:00	(China) DF-15		(China)		(China) PLA	
4 August; 05:56–09:00	(China)		Suborbital	Missile test	4 August	Successful
4 August; 05:56–09:00	11 missiles launched. 2 of 11. Apogee: ~200 km (120 mi).					
4 August; 05:56–09:00	(China) DF-15		(China)		(China) PLA	
4 August; 05:56–09:00	(China)		Suborbital	Missile test	4 August	Successful
4 August; 05:56–09:00	11 missiles launched. 3 of 11. Apogee: ~200 km (120 mi).					
4 August; 05:56–09:00	(China) DF-15		(China)		(China) PLA	
4 August; 05:56–09:00	(China)		Suborbital	Missile test	4 August	Successful
4 August; 05:56–09:00	11 missiles launched. 4 of 11. Apogee: ~200 km (120 mi).					
4 August; 05:56–09:00	(China) DF-15		(China)		(China) PLA	
4 August; 05:56–09:00	(China)		Suborbital	Missile test	4 August	Successful
4 August; 05:56–09:00	11 missiles launched. 5 of 11. Apogee: ~200 km (120 mi).					
4 August; 05:56–09:00	(China) DF-15		(China)		(China) PLA	
4 August; 05:56–09:00	(China)		Suborbital	Missile test	4 August	Successful
4 August; 05:56–09:00	11 missiles launched. 6 of 11. Apogee: ~200 km (120 mi).					
4 August; 05:56–09:00	(China) DF-15		(China)		(China) PLA	
4 August; 05:56–09:00	(China)		Suborbital	Missile test	4 August	Successful
4 August; 05:56–09:00	11 missiles launched. 7 of 11. Apogee: ~200 km (120 mi).					
4 August; 05:56–09:00	(China) DF-15		(China)		(China) PLA	
4 August; 05:56–09:00	(China)		Suborbital	Missile test	4 August	Successful
4 August; 05:56–09:00	11 missiles launched. 8 of 11. Apogee: ~200 km (120 mi).					
4 August; 05:56–09:00	(China) DF-15		(China)		(China) PLA	
4 August; 05:56–09:00	(China)		Suborbital	Missile test	4 August	Successful
4 August; 05:56–09:00	11 missiles launched. 9 of 11. Apogee: ~200 km (120 mi).					
4 August; 05:56–09:00	(China) DF-15		(China)		(China) PLA	
4 August; 05:56–09:00	(China)		Suborbital	Missile test	4 August	Successful
4 August; 05:56–09:00	11 missiles launched. 10 of 11. Apogee: ~200 km (120 mi).					
4 August; 05:56–09:00	(China) DF-15		(China)		(China) PLA	
4 August; 05:56–09:00	(China)		Suborbital	Missile test	4 August	Successful
4 August; 05:56–09:00	11 missiles launched. 11 of 11. Apogee: ~200 km (120 mi).					
4 August; 13:56:07	(United States) New Shepard	NS-22	(United States) Corn Ranch		(United States) Blue Origin	
4 August; 13:56:07	(United States) Blue Origin NS-22	Blue Origin	Suborbital	Crewed spaceflight	4 August; 14:06:27	Successful
4 August; 13:56:07	Sixth crewed flight of New Shepard. Apogee: 107 km (66 mi).					
9 August	(United States) ARAV-B	Pacific Dragon	(United States) Barking Sands		United States Navy	
9 August	(United States)	United States Navy	Suborbital	Missile target	9 August	Successful
9 August	Exercise Pacific Dragon 2022.					
9 August	(United States) SM-3 Block IA	Pacific Dragon	(United States) USS Fitzgerald		United States Navy	
9 August	(United States) Kill vehicle	United States Navy	Suborbital	Interceptor	9 August	Successful
9 August	Successful test of the Aegis Ballistic Missile Defense System. Interceptor targeting a short-range ballistic missile.					
11 August; 14:20:00	(Japan) S-520	S-520-32	(Japan) Uchinoura LP-KS		(Japan) JAXA	
11 August; 14:20:00	(Japan)	Toyama Prefectural University	Suborbital	Ionospheric research	11 August	Successful
11 August; 14:20:00	Apogee: 279 km (173 mi).					
11 August; 22:08:30	(United States) Terrier-Improved Malemute	ROCKSAT-X 2022	(United States) Wallops Flight Facility		(United States) NASA	
11 August; 22:08:30	(United States) RockSat-X	Colorado Space Grant Consortium	Suborbital	Education	11 August	Successful
11 August; 22:08:30	Apogee: 159 km (99 mi).					
16 August; 07:49	(United States) Minuteman III		(United States) Vandenberg LF-09		(United States) AFGSC	
16 August; 07:49	(United States)	AFGSC	Suborbital	Test flight	16 August	Successful
22 August; 05:30	(Canada) Black Brant IX		(United States) White Sands Missile Range		(United States) NASA	
22 August; 05:30	(United States) Micro-X	Northwestern University	Suborbital	X-ray astronomy	22 August	Successful
22 August; 05:30	Second flight of the Micro-X payload. Apogee: 254 km (158 mi).					
24 August; 01:16	(United States) Terrier-Improved Malemute		(United States) Wallops Flight Facility		(United States) NASA	
24 August; 01:16	(United States) SpEED Demon	ERAU	Suborbital	Technology demonstration	24 August	Successful
24 August; 01:16	Sporadic-E ElectroDynamics Demonstration mission (SpEED Demon). Apogee: 160 km (99 mi).					
25 August	(China) Reusable Suborbital Carrier		(China) Jiuquan		(China) CASC	
25 August		CASC	Suborbital	Test flight	25 August	Successful
25 August	Second test flight of the Reusable Suborbital Carrier (亚轨道重复使用运载器). It successfully landed at Alxa Right Banner Badanjilin Airport.					
29 August; ~22:30	(Netherlands) T-Minus Engineering Dart	TED-03/VE^{2}NOM	(Australia) Koonibba Test Range		(Netherlands) T-Minus Engineering	
29 August; ~22:30	(Australia) TMSLA-1323	Asension	Suborbital	Technology demonstration	29/30 August	Launch failure
29 August; ~22:30	First of two anticipated launches for the TED-03/VE^{2}NOM launch campaign. The rocket suffered an anomaly and failed to reach its target altitude. The second launch was not attempted.					
3 September; 06:50	(India) RH-300 Mk II	F22	(India) TERLS		(India) ISRO	
3 September; 06:50	(India) Inflatable Aerodynamic Decelerator	ISRO	Suborbital	Technology demonstration	3 September	Successful
3 September; 06:50	Apogee: 84 km (52 mi).					
7 September; 08:13	(United States) Minuteman III		(United States) Vandenberg LF-10		(United States) AFGSC	
7 September; 08:13	(United States) Test reentry vehicles	AFGSC	Suborbital	Test flight	7 September	Successful
7–8 September	(Iran) Fateh-360		(Iran) Nasrabad, Isfahan		(Iran) NEZAJA	
7–8 September	(Iran) Live warhead	NEZAJA	Suborbital	Missile test	7–8 September	Successful
7–8 September	Part of the Eqtedar-1401 military exercise.					
12 September; 14:27	(United States) New Shepard	NS-23	(United States) Corn Ranch		(United States) Blue Origin	
12 September; 14:27	(United States) Blue Origin NS-23	Blue Origin	Suborbital	Uncrewed commercial spaceflight	12 September	Launch failure
12 September; 14:27	Uncrewed flight of New Shepard, carrying 36 commercial payloads. A booster failure around 1 minute into the flight caused a mission abort, with the capsule successfully separating from the booster and landing under parachutes. The cause of the failure is currently under investigation.					
24 September	(Slovenia)		(United States) Black Rock Desert		(Slovenia) Andrej Vrbec and Denis Banovic	
24 September	(Slovenia)	Andrej Vrbec and Denis Banovic	Suborbital	Amateur rocket	24 September	Partial launch failure
24 September	Estimated apogee: >100 km (62 mi). The rocket flew as intended, but telemetry was lost 4 minutes into flight. The first stage was recovered.					
26 September; 04:10	(Canada) Black Brant IX		(United States) White Sands Missile Range		(United States) NASA	
26 September; 04:10	(United States) tREXS 1	Penn State University	Suborbital	X-ray astronomy	26 September	Successful
26 September; 04:10	The Rockets for Extended-source X-ray Spectroscopy (tREXS). Apogee: 252.2 km (156.7 mi).					
1 October; 06:26:00	(Brazil) VSB-30		(Sweden) Esrange		(Germany) MORABA	
1 October; 06:26:00	(Germany) TEXUS-57	DLR / ESA	Suborbital	Microgravity research	1 October	Successful
1 October; 06:26:00	Apogee: 240 km (150 mi).					
1 October; 17:30:58	(United States) MESOS		(United States) Black Rock Desert		(United States) Kip Daugirdas	
1 October; 17:30:58	(United States)	Kip Daugirdas	Suborbital	Amateur rocket	1 October	Successful
1 October; 17:30:58	Apogee: 89.45 km (55.58 mi).					
3 October; 22:22	(North Korea) Hwasong-12 modified		(North Korea) Mupyong-ri, Chagang		(North Korea) KPA Strategic Force	
3 October; 22:22	(North Korea)	KPA Strategic Force	Suborbital	Missile test	3 October; 22:44	Successful
3 October; 22:22	Apogee: 970 km (600 mi). Downrange distance of approximately 4,500 km (2,800 mi).					
3 October	(Iran) Saman-1 test rocket		(Iran)		(Iran) Ministry of Defence	
3 October	(Iran) Saman-1	ISRC	Suborbital	Technology demonstration	3 October	Successful
3 October	Test of the Saman-1 upper stage.					
4 October; 15:00	(United States) ATACMS		(South Korea) Gangneung Air Base		United States Army	
4 October; 15:00	(United States)	United States Army	Suborbital	Missile test	4 October	Successful
4 October; 15:00	Launch of four ATACMS missiles (1 of 4). Apogee: ~80 km (50 mi).					
4 October; 15:00	(United States) ATACMS		(South Korea) Gangneung Air Base		United States Army	
4 October; 15:00	(United States)	United States Army	Suborbital	Missile test	4 October	Successful
4 October; 15:00	Launch of four ATACMS missiles (2 of 4). Apogee: ~80 km (50 mi).					
4 October; 15:00	(United States) ATACMS		(South Korea) Gangneung Air Base		United States Army	
4 October; 15:00	(United States)	United States Army	Suborbital	Missile test	4 October	Successful
4 October; 15:00	Launch of four ATACMS missiles (3 of 4). Apogee: ~80 km (50 mi).					
4 October; 15:00	(United States) ATACMS		(South Korea) Gangneung Air Base		United States Army	
4 October; 15:00	(United States)	United States Army	Suborbital	Missile test	4 October	Successful
4 October; 15:00	Launch of four ATACMS missiles (4 of 4). Apogee: ~80 km (50 mi).					
4 October; 16:00	(South Korea) Hyunmoo-2		(South Korea) Gangneung Air Base		(South Korea) ADD	
4 October; 16:00	(South Korea)	ADD	Suborbital	Missile test	4 October	Launch failure
4 October; 16:00	The missile "failed shortly after launch and crashed."					
8 October; ~16:48	(North Korea) KN-25		(North Korea) Munchon		(North Korea) KPA Strategic Force	
8 October; ~16:48	(North Korea)	KPA Strategic Force	Suborbital	Missile test	8 October	Successful
8 October; ~16:48	Apogee: 90 km (56 mi). Downrange distance of approximately 350 km (220 mi). (1 of 2).					
8 October; ~16:58	(North Korea) KN-25		(North Korea) Munchon		(North Korea) KPA Strategic Force	
8 October; ~16:58	(North Korea)	KPA Strategic Force	Suborbital	Missile test	8 October	Successful
8 October; ~16:58	Apogee: 90 km (56 mi). Downrange distance of approximately 350 km (220 mi). (2 of 2).					
8 October	(United Kingdom) Skylark L		(Iceland) Langanes launch site		(United Kingdom) Skyrora	
8 October	(United Kingdom)	Skyrora	Suborbital	Test flight	8 October	Launch failure
8 October	Intended apogee: 102 km (63 mi). The vehicle experienced an anomaly shortly after lift-off, landing in the sea 500 m from the pad.					
14 October	(India) Sagarika		(India) INS Arihant		(India) Ministry of Defence	
14 October	(India)	Ministry of Defence	Suborbital	Missile test	14 October	Successful
18 October; ~04:00	(Turkey) Tayfun		(Turkey) Rize–Artvin Airport		(Turkey) Roketsan	
18 October; ~04:00	(Turkey)	Roketsan	Suborbital	Missile test	18 October; 04:07:38	Successful
17–21 October	(Netherlands) Kingfisher		(United Kingdom) MOD Hebrides Range		(Netherlands) T-Minus Engineering	
17–21 October	(Netherlands)	T-Minus Engineering	Suborbital	Test flight	11–25 October	Successful
17–21 October	Maiden flight of the Kingfisher suborbital launch vehicle. Apogee: 185 km (115 mi).					
17–21 October	(Netherlands) Kingfisher		(United Kingdom) MOD Hebrides Range		(Netherlands) T-Minus Engineering	
17–21 October	(Netherlands)	T-Minus Engineering	Suborbital	Test flight	11–25 October	Successful
17–21 October	Apogee: 185 km (115 mi).					
21 October; 07:25	(United States) Improved Malemute/Improved Malemute		(Sweden) Esrange		(Germany) MORABA	
21 October; 07:25	(Germany) MAPHEUS-12	DLR	Suborbital	Microgravity research	21 October	Successful
21 October; 07:25	Apogee: 260 km (160 mi).					
21 October	(India) Agni-Prime		(India) INS Arihant		(India) Integrated Test Range	
21 October	(India)	Ministry of Defence	Suborbital	Missile test	21 October	Successful
23 October; 17:20	(Brazil) VSB-30	V29	(Brazil) Alcântara		(Brazil) FAB	
23 October; 17:20	(Brazil) MQ-PSM	AEB	Suborbital	Technology demonstration	23 October; 17:27	Successful
23 October; 17:20	Test flight of the MQ-PSM (Modelo de Qualificação da Plataforma Suborbital de Microgravidade) technology, designated "Operação Santa Branca". Apogee: 227 km (141 mi).					
26 October; 18:30	(United States) Terrier-Improved Malemute		(United States) Wallops Flight Facility		(United States) NASA	
26 October; 18:30	(United States)	Sandia National Laboratories	Suborbital	Technology demonstration	26 October	Successful
26 October; 18:30	1 of 2. High Operational Tempo for Hypersonics flight campaign.					
26 October	(Russia) Sineva		(Russia) K-114 Tula		(Russia) Ministry of Defence	
26 October	(Russia)	Ministry of Defence	Suborbital	Missile test	26 October	Successful
26 October	(Russia) Yars		(Russia) Plesetsk		(Russia) Ministry of Defence	
26 October	(Russia)	Ministry of Defence	Suborbital	Missile test	26 October	Successful
27 October	(United States) Terrier-Improved Malemute		(United States) Wallops Flight Facility		(United States) NASA	
27 October	(United States)	Sandia National Laboratories	Suborbital	Technology demonstration	27 October	Successful
27 October	2 of 2. High Operational Tempo for Hypersonics flight campaign.					
1 November	(North Korea) Hwasong?		(North Korea)		(North Korea) KPA Strategic Force	
1 November	(North Korea)	KPA Strategic Force	Suborbital	Missile test	1 November	Successful
1 November	Apogee: 150 km (93 mi), downrange distance of 150 km (93 mi).					
1 November	(North Korea) Hwasong?		(North Korea)		(North Korea) KPA Strategic Force	
1 November	(North Korea)	KPA Strategic Force	Suborbital	Missile test	1 November	Successful
1 November	Apogee: 100 km (62 mi), downrange distance of 200 km (120 mi).					
2 November; 22:39	(North Korea) Hwasong-15 modified		(North Korea) Sunan		(North Korea) KPA Strategic Force	
2 November; 22:39	(North Korea)	KPA Strategic Force	Suborbital	Missile test	3 November	Failure?
2 November; 22:39	Apogee: 1,920 km (1,190 mi).					
2 November	(India) AD-1		(India) Integrated Test Range		(India) DRDO	
2 November	(India)	DRDO	Suborbital	Missile test	2 November	Successful
2 November	Flight test of the AD-1 Ballistic Missile Interceptor.					
3 November; ~12:30	(North Korea) Hwasong-6		(North Korea)		(North Korea) KPA Strategic Force	
3 November; ~12:30	(North Korea)	KPA Strategic Force	Suborbital	Missile test	3 November	Successful
3 November; ~12:30	Apogee: 130 km (81 mi). (1 of 3).					
3 November; ~12:30	(North Korea) Hwasong-6		(North Korea)		(North Korea) KPA Strategic Force	
3 November; ~12:30	(North Korea)	KPA Strategic Force	Suborbital	Missile test	3 November	Successful
3 November; ~12:30	Apogee: 130 km (81 mi). (2 of 3).					
3 November; ~12:30	(North Korea) Hwasong-6		(North Korea)		(North Korea) KPA Strategic Force	
3 November; ~12:30	(North Korea)	KPA Strategic Force	Suborbital	Missile test	3 November	Successful
3 November; ~12:30	Apogee: 130 km (81 mi). (3 of 3).					
3 November	(Russia) Bulava		(Russia) Generalissimus Suvorov		(Russia) Ministry of Defence	
3 November	(Russia)	Ministry of Defence	Suborbital	Missile test	3 November	Successful
5 November; 09:07:00	(United States) Improved Orion		(Sweden) Esrange		(Germany) (Sweden) MORABA / SNSA	
5 November; 09:07:00	(Germany) (Sweden) REXUS-27	DLR / SNSA	Suborbital	Education	5 November	Successful
5 November; 09:07:00	Apogee: 84.9 km (52.8 mi).					
5 November	(Iran) Qaem 100		(Iran) Shahroud Space Center		(Iran) IRGC	
5 November	(Iran)	IRGC	Suborbital	Flight test	5 November	Successful
5 November	Suborbital test flight of the first stage of the Qaem 100 orbital launch vehicle.					
7 November; 06:43:00	(United States) Improved Orion		(Sweden) Esrange		(Germany) (Sweden) MORABA / SNSA	
7 November; 06:43:00	(Germany) (Sweden) REXUS-28	DLR / SNSA	Suborbital	Education	7 November	Successful
7 November; 06:43:00	Apogee: 95.7 km (59.5 mi).					
16 November	(United States) T4-E	JFTM-07 E1	(United States) Pacific Missile Range Facility		(United States) MDA	
16 November	(United States)	MDA	Suborbital	ABM target	16 November	Successful
16 November	Apogee: 300 km (186 mi)?, intercepted by SM-3 Block IIA.					
16 November	(United States) SM-3 Block IIA	JFTM-07 E1	(Japan) JS Maya, Pacific Ocean		(Japan) JMSDF	
16 November	(Japan)	JMSDF	Suborbital	ABM interceptor	16 November	Successful
16 November	Apogee: 300 km (186 mi)?, intercepted target.					
16 November	(United States) Terrier Terrier Oriole	JFTM-07 E1	(United States) Pacific Missile Range Facility		(United States) MDA	
16 November	(United States)	MDA	Suborbital	ABM target	16 November	Successful
16 November	Apogee: Intercepted by SM-3.					
16 November	(United States) SM-3 Block IB	JFTM-07 E1	(United States) Pacific Missile Range Facility		(United States) MDA	
16 November	(United States)	MDA	Suborbital	ABM target	16 November	Successful
16 November	Apogee: Intercepted.					
16 November	(United States) SM-2 Block IIIB	JFTM-07 E1	(United States) Pacific Missile Range Facility		(United States) MDA	
16 November	(United States)	MDA	Suborbital	ABM target	16 November	Successful
16 November	Apogee: Intercepted.					
18 November; 01:14	(North Korea) Hwasong-17		(North Korea) Sunan		(North Korea) KPA Strategic Force	
18 November; 01:14	(North Korea)	KPA Strategic Force	Suborbital	Missile test	18 November	Successful
18 November; 01:14	Apogee: ~6,000 km (3,700 mi).					
18 November; 06:00	(India) Vikram-S		(India) Satish Dhawan SRLC		(India) Skyroot Aerospace	
18 November; 06:00	(India) Fun-Sat	Space Kidz India	Suborbital	Education	18 November; 06:05	Successful
18 November; 06:00	⚀ (India) LakshyaSat-2	N Space Tech	Suborbital	Flight test	18 November; 06:05	Successful
18 November; 06:00	⚀ (Armenia) Name unknown	BazoomQ Space Research Lab	Suborbital	Education	18 November; 06:05	Successful
18 November; 06:00	Test flight of the Vikram-S demonstrator rocket, designated "Prarambh", carrying three payloads. Apogee: 89.5 km (55.6 mi).					
18 November	(Russia) RS-28 Sarmat		(Russia) Plesetsk		(Russia) RVSN	
18 November	(Russia)	RVSN	Suborbital	Missile test	18 November	Successful
19 November	(United States) SRBM	JFTM-07 E2	(United States) Pacific Missile Range Facility		(United States) MDA	
19 November	(United States)	MDA	Suborbital	ABM target	19 November	Successful
19 November	Apogee: 150 km (93 mi)?, intercepted by SM-3 Block IB.					
19 November	(United States) SM-3 Block IB	JFTM-07 E2	(Japan) JS Haguro, Pacific Ocean		(Japan) JMSDF	
19 November	(Japan)	JMSDF	Suborbital	ABM interceptor	19 November	Successful
19 November	Apogee: 150 km (93 mi)?, intercepted target.					
20 November; 17:20:00	(Canada) Black Brant IX		(Norway) Andøya		(United States) NASA	
20 November; 17:20:00	(United States) ACES II High-Flyer	University of Iowa	Suborbital	Auroral science	20 November	Successful
20 November; 17:20:00	First of two launches for the Auroral Current and Electrodynamics Structure (ACES) II mission. The two rocket launches were timed to reach their apogee at the same time. Apogee: 406.3 km (252.5 mi).					
20 November; 17:21:40	(Canada) Black Brant IX		(Norway) Andøya		(United States) NASA	
20 November; 17:21:40	(United States) ACES II Low-Flyer	University of Iowa	Suborbital	Auroral science	20 November	Successful
20 November; 17:21:40	Second of two launches for the ACES II mission. The two rocket launches were timed to reach their apogee at the same time. Apogee: 187.8 km (116.7 mi).					
23 November; 08:23:00	(Brazil) VSB-30	S1X-3/M15	(Sweden) Esrange		(Sweden) SSC	
23 November; 08:23:00	(Sweden) MASER-15	SSC	Suborbital	Microgravity research	23 November	Successful
23 November; 08:23:00	SubOrbital Express Microgravity flight opportunity 3. Apogee: 260 km (160 mi).					
23 November	(India) Agni-Prime		(India) INS Arihant		(India) Ministry of Defence	
23 November	(India)	Ministry of Defence	Suborbital	Missile test	23 November	Successful
2 December	(Russia) Nudol (?)		(Kazakhstan) Sary Shagan		(Russia) Ministry of Defence	
2 December	(Russia)	Ministry of Defence	Suborbital	Missile test	2 December	Successful
9 December	(United States) AGM-183 ARRW		(United States) Boeing B-52 Stratofortress		United States Air Force	
9 December	(United States) Live hypersonic glide vehicle	United States Air Force	Suborbital	Missile test	9 December	Successful
15 December	(India) Agni-V		(India) Integrated Test Range		(India) Ministry of Defence	
15 December	(India)	Ministry of Defence	Suborbital	Missile test	15 December	Successful
18 December	(North Korea) Hwasong-7 modified		(North Korea) Sohae		(North Korea) KPA Strategic Force	
18 December	(North Korea) Reconnaissance satellite cameras	NADA	Suborbital	Technology demonstration Missile test	18 December	Successful
18 December	Apogee: 550 km (340 mi). Reconnaissance satellite cameras were tested on these two flights.					
18 December	(North Korea) Hwasong-7 modified		(North Korea) Sohae		(North Korea) KPA Strategic Force	
18 December	(North Korea) Reconnaissance satellite cameras	NADA	Suborbital	Technology demonstration Missile test	18 December	Successful
18 December	Apogee: 550 km (340 mi). Reconnaissance satellite cameras were tested on these two flights.					
19 December; 10:00 ?	(China) Unknown missile		(China) Jiuquan		(China) PLA ?	
19 December; 10:00 ?			Suborbital	Test flight	19 December	Successful
19 December; 10:00 ?	Apogee: 200 km (120 mi) ?					
30 December	(South Korea) SK solid fueled TV1		(South Korea)		(South Korea) Ministry of National Defense	
30 December	(South Korea)	Ministry of National Defense	Suborbital	Test flight	30 December	Successful
30 December	Second test launch of the solid-fuel launch projectile developed by the ADD.					
30 December; ~23:01–23:15	(North Korea)		(North Korea) Chunghwa, North Hwanghae		(North Korea) KPA Strategic Force	
30 December; ~23:01–23:15	(North Korea)	NADA	Suborbital	Missile test	30 December	Successful
30 December; ~23:01–23:15	Apogee: 100 km (62 mi). (1 of 3).					
30 December; ~23:01–23:15	(North Korea)		(North Korea) Chunghwa, North Hwanghae		(North Korea) KPA Strategic Force	
30 December; ~23:01–23:15	(North Korea)	NADA	Suborbital	Missile test	30 December	Successful
30 December; ~23:01–23:15	Apogee: 100 km (62 mi). (2 of 3).					
30 December; ~23:01–23:15	(North Korea)		(North Korea) Chunghwa, North Hwanghae		(North Korea) KPA Strategic Force	
30 December; ~23:01–23:15	(North Korea)	NADA	Suborbital	Missile test	30 December	Successful
30 December; ~23:01–23:15	Apogee: 100 km (62 mi). (3 of 3).					
31 December; ~17:50	(North Korea)		(North Korea)		(North Korea)	
31 December; ~17:50	(North Korea)		Suborbital	Missile test	31 December	
31 December; ~17:50	Apogee: ~100 km (62 mi)					
