= 2022 in spaceflight =

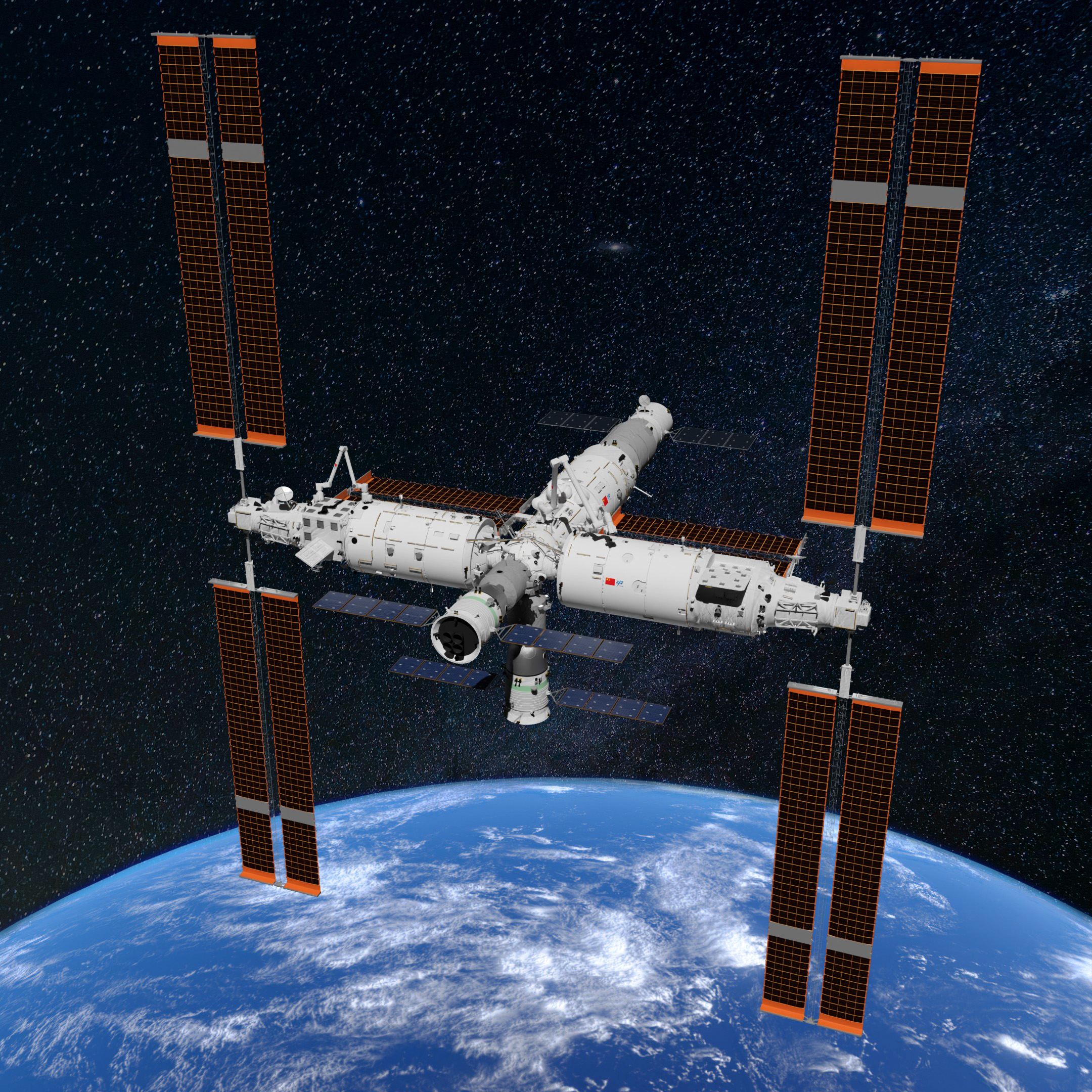
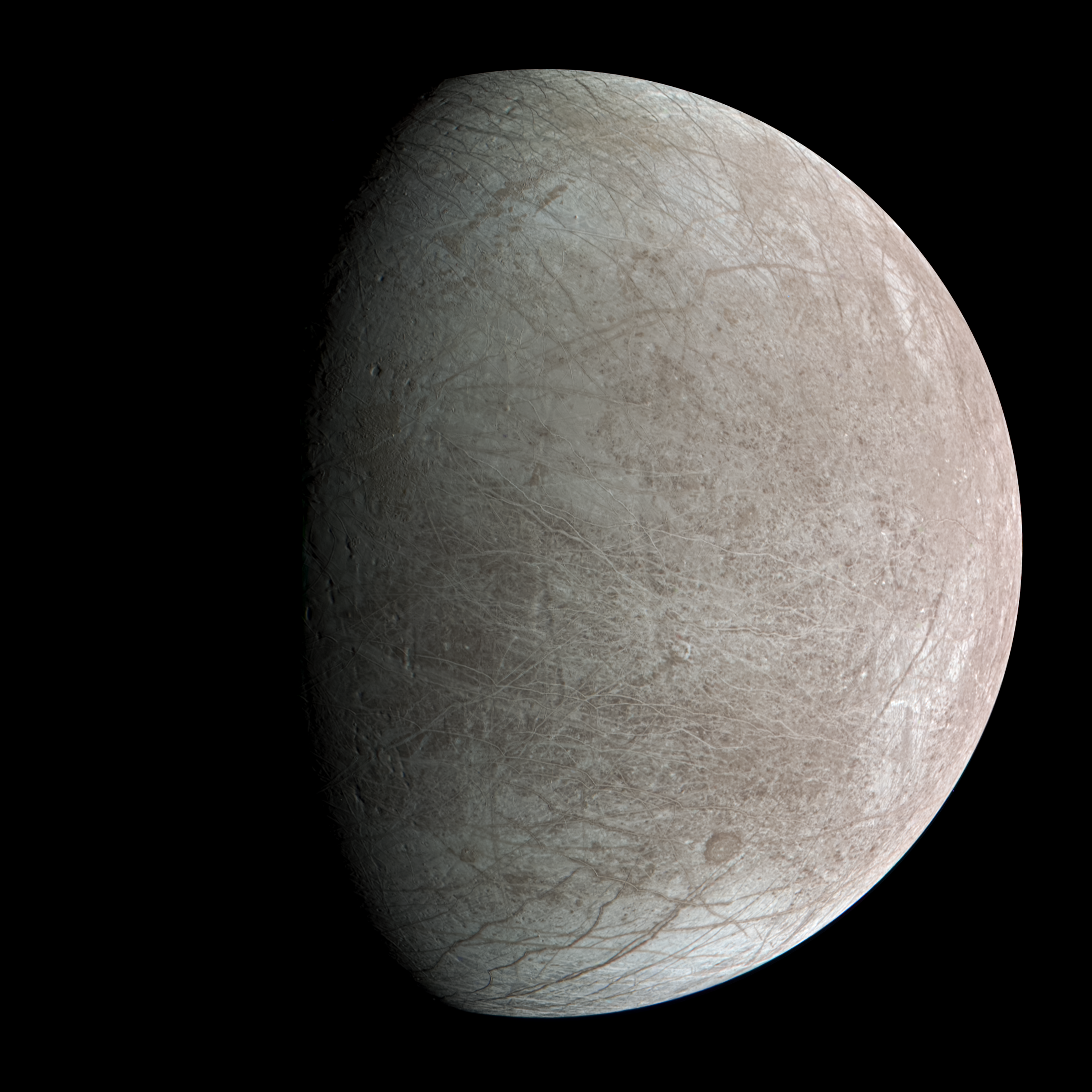
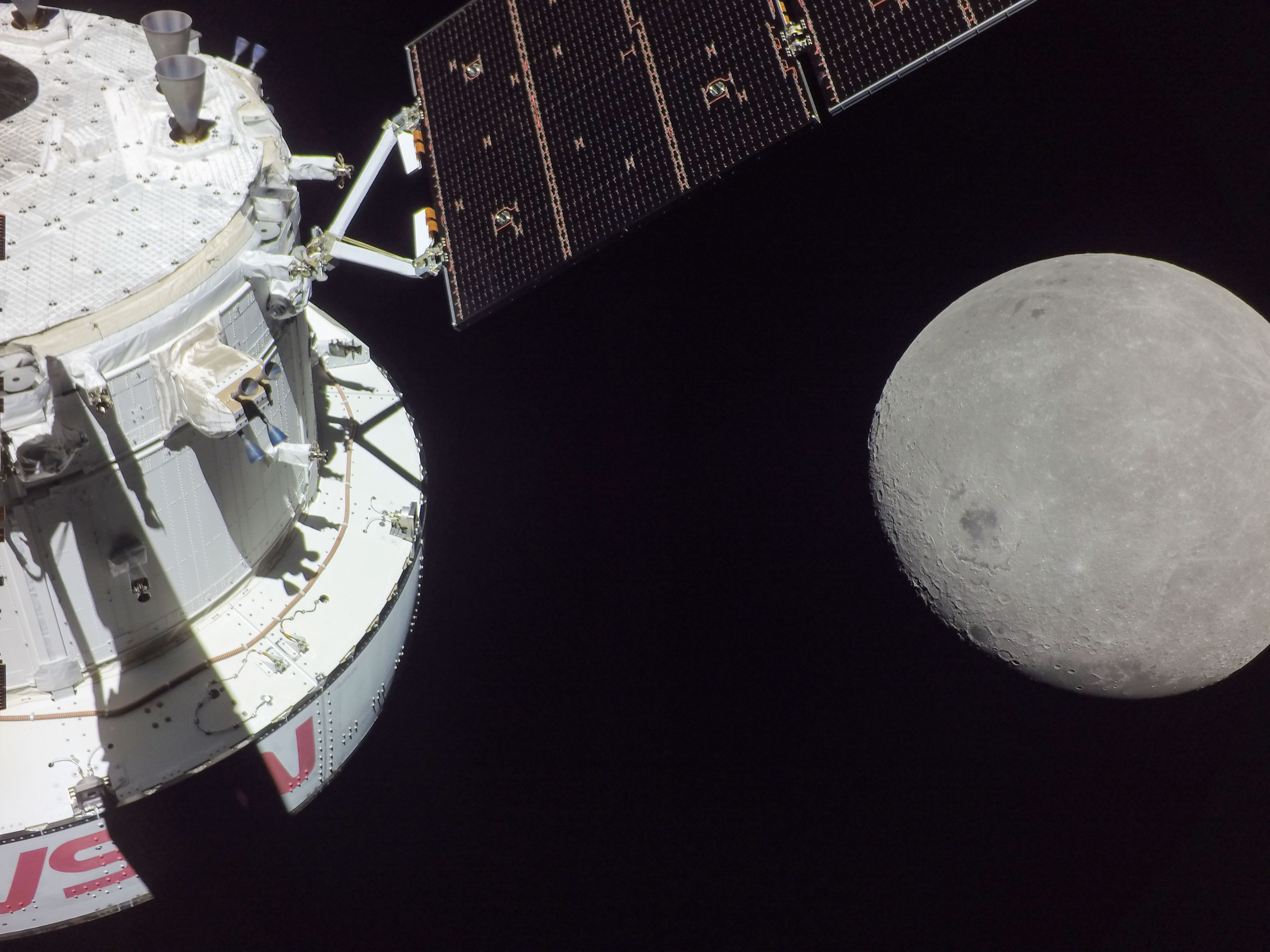
- Highlights from spaceflight in 2022 (Note: Clockwise from top: Assembly of the Tiangong space station was completed following the addition of the Wentian and Mengtian modules; The DART spacecraft successfully impacted Dimorphos, marking the first real-world test of a planetary defense technique; Artemis 1 completed a 25-day mission around the Moon, verifying the Space Launch System and Orion spacecraft; Juno conducted a flyby of Jupiter's moon Europa)

Orbital launches
- First: 6 January
- Last: 30 December
- Total: 186
- Successes: 178
- Failures: 7
- Partial failures: 1
- Catalogued: 169

National firsts
- Satellite: Moldova; Armenia (in partnership with Spain); Uganda; Zimbabwe
- Space traveller: Egypt; Portugal
- Suborbital launch: Slovenia

Rockets
- Maiden flights: Angara 1.2; Atlas V 511; Jielong 3; Kinetica-1; Long March 6A; SLS Block 1; SSLV; Vega C; Zhuque-2
- Retirements: Atlas V 401; Atlas V 421; Atlas V 511; Atlas V 531; Atlas V 541; Rocket 3

Crewed flights
- Orbital: 7
- Orbital travellers: 24
- Suborbital: 3
- Suborbital travellers: 18
- Total travellers: 42
- EVAs: 15

2022 in spaceflight

The year 2022 witnessed the number of launches of SpaceX's Falcon rocket family (61 launches) surpassing the CNSA's Long March rocket family (53 launches), making the United States the country with the highest number of launches in 2022 instead of China. This year also featured the first successful launch of Long March 6A, Nuri, Angara 1.2, Vega C, Kinetica-1, and Jielong-3. National space agencies' activities in this year was also affected by the Russian invasion of Ukraine, which led to tensions between Roscosmos and Western space agencies, leading to threats of ending collaboration on the International Space Station (ISS), and resulting in several delays on various space missions.

In terms of national-level scientific space missions, this year is a focal year on lunar exploration. 2022 saw the launch of NASA's CAPSTONE orbiter, KARI's Danuri orbiter and NASA's Artemis 1, the first mission of the Artemis program. In particular, Artemis 1 has two major goals: testing the Orion spacecraft and Space Launch System, and deployment of CubeSats. This year also saw the impact of Double Asteroid Redirection Test on Dimorphos marking the first time a planetary defense technique is tested, NASA's Juno flyby of Europa, and the loss of communication from ISRO's Mars Orbiter Mission and NASA's InSight Martian probe.

Two crewed space stations, the ISS and Tiangong, are in operation in 2022. This year also marks docking of Wentian and Mengtian modules to Tiangong. In terms of crewed missions, the ISS saw Expedition 66, 67, and 68, while Tiangong saw Shenzhou 13, 14, and 15. The ISS also briefly hosted private crews of Soyuz MS-20. The ISS also saw docking of Starliner's Boeing Orbital Flight Test 2.

This year also saw the first time citizens of Egypt and Portugal crossed the 50 mi (80 km) altitude mark, which is the United States's definition of outer space. They did so in a suborbital launch organized by Virgin Galactic, however, they did not managed to cross the Kármán line (100 km or 62 mi). Slovenia performed its first ever suborbital launch in 2022. Moldova, Armenia, Uganda and Zimbabwe have their own satellite in orbit for the first time in 2022.

== Overview ==
=== Exploration of the Solar System ===
NASA continued the mission of the Juno spacecraft at Jupiter by conducting a flyby of Europa on 29 September 2022.

In Mars exploration, the European Space Agency (ESA) had partnered with Roscosmos to launch the Rosalind Franklin rover using the Kazachok lander as part of ExoMars 2022. In March 2022, the launch was cancelled in the wake of the Russian invasion of Ukraine and the subsequent suspension of ESA–Roscosmos cooperation on ExoMars.

On 3 October 2022, the Indian Space Research Organisation released a statement that all attempts to revive their Mars Orbiter Mission (MOM), also called Mangalyaan, had failed and officially declared it dead citing the loss of fuel and battery power to the probe's instruments.

On 20 December 2022, NASA announced that the InSight lander had lost communications with Earth on 15 December 2022, with the end of the mission being declared on 21 December 2022.

=== Lunar exploration ===
NASA's CAPSTONE lunar orbiter launched on 28 June and arrived in lunar orbit on 14 November 2022.

Artemis 1, the first flight of NASA's Space Launch System (SLS) and the first lunar mission for Orion, was launched on 16 November 2022. Artemis 1 transported as secondary payloads many small research spacecraft, with multiple of those spacecraft intended to study the Moon. Unfortunately most of the spacecraft (especially those studying the Moon) failed in their missions. Japan launched the OMOTENASHI lunar lander as a secondary payload of the Artemis 1 mission; contact with OMOTENASHI was lost and the mission failed before the landing sequence to the lunar surface had begun.

The United States planned to also launch a number of commercial lunar landers and rovers. As part of NASA's Commercial Lunar Payload Services program, the launch of Astrobotic Technology's Peregrine lander and Intuitive Machines' Nova-C lander was scheduled. However, all the launches of US commercial lunar landers and rovers planned for 2022 were delayed and did not launch in 2022.

On 4 August 2022, South Korea's first lunar orbiter Danuri was launched into space by a Falcon 9 rocket. The orbiter took several months to enter lunar orbit; lunar orbit insertion happened on 16 December 2022 (UTC).

On 11 December 2022 a Falcon 9 rocket launched the Hakuto-R Mission 1, a private Moon mission by the Japanese company ispace. Onboard the Hakuto-R lunar lander were the Lunar Excursion Vehicle 1 (LEV-1, also called Transformable Lunar Robot) lunar rover from Japan and the Rashid lunar rover flying the Emirates Lunar Mission. Landing to Moon was planned to occur in April 2023. The NASA lunar orbiter, Lunar Flashlight, was launched as piggyback payload; a failure of the craft's propulsion system resulted in Lunar Flashlight being unable to enter orbit around the Moon and NASA terminated the mission on 12 May 2023. The Hakuto-R Mission 1 was lost during the final moments of descent to the lunar surface at 16:40 UTC on 25 April 2023. The ispace team confirmed that the spacecraft had crashed into the Moon.

=== Human spaceflight ===
China finished the construction of the Tiangong space station with the addition of the Wentian and Mengtian lab modules. Wentian was successfully launched and docked to the space station on 24 July 2022, while Mengtian was launched on 31 October 2022 and was docked to the space station later that day. On 29 November 2022 with Shenzhou 15 docking to the Tiangong space station, China started its first crew handover.

On 19 May 2022, Boeing launched the almost six-day (landing 25 May 2022) second uncrewed test flight of its Starliner space capsule. The test flight was successful and led the way for Starliner's first crewed test flight in 2024.

==== Space tourism ====
Blue Origin's New Shepard launched six passengers each on a suborbital trajectory in three flights, NS-20 on 31 March, NS-21 on 4 June and NS-22 on 4 August. The failure of the uncrewed flight NS-23 in September paused launches of the system.

On 8 April 2022, SpaceX's Crew Dragon space capsule was launched by a Falcon 9 rocket for the first American space tourist mission to the International Space Station. The crew on board the Axiom Space-operated mission included one professional astronaut (space vehicle commander) and three tourists. The mission, known as Axiom Mission 1, lasted a little over 17 days and was the first wholly commercially operated crewed mission to the ISS.

=== Rocket innovation ===
Arianespace's Ariane 6 was expected to make its long-delayed maiden flight, targeting a per-satellite launch cost similar to a Falcon 9, but was delayed to 2023.

After suborbital tests in 2020 and 2021, SpaceX planned to conduct the first orbital test flight of the fully reusable Starship launch vehicle. This was further delayed to 2023, where it launched.

The maiden flight of Vulcan Centaur was planned for 2022. The launch vehicle is designed by United Launch Alliance to gradually replace Atlas V and Delta IV Heavy at lower costs. However, the maiden flight was delayed to 2023.

Mitsubishi Heavy Industries's H3 launch vehicle, which was scheduled to enter service in 2022, targeted a cost less than half that of its predecessor H-IIA. The maiden flight of H3 did not take place in 2022.

On 21 January 2022, the Atlas V 511 launched for the first time. This was the only planned flight of the Atlas V in the 511 configuration. The launch was successful.

On 29 March 2022, the Long March 6A rocket performed its maiden launch, successfully reaching orbit.

On 29 April 2022, the Angara 1.2 rocket had its maiden launch, successfully reaching orbit.

On 2 May 2022, Rocket Lab attempted first mid-air helicopter capture of the first stage of their Electron rocket. Attempt was successful at initially grabbing the rocket, but the vehicle was dropped in order to ensure the safety of the helicopter and its pilot.

On 13 July 2022, Vega C had its debut flight during which it delivered the LARES 2 and six other satellites from French Guiana to orbit.

On 27 July 2022, CAS Space's Kinetica-1 rocket performed its maiden launch, successfully sending six satellites into orbit.

On 7 August 2022, SSLV had its debut flight. However, due to the final VTM stage failure, the stage as well as the two satellite payloads were injected into an unstable elliptical orbit measuring 356 km x 76 km and subsequently destroyed upon reentry. According to the ISRO, the mission software failed to identify and correct a sensor fault in the VTM stage.

On 16 November 2022, Artemis 1 saw the debut flight of NASA's Space Launch System, which is designed to return humans to the Moon in the Artemis program.

On 9 December 2022, Jielong-3 performed its maiden launch from the Yellow Sea, successfully sending fourteen satellites into orbit.

On 14 December 2022, Zhuque-2 had its debut flight, but failed to reach orbit due to the failure of vernier thrusters on its second stage, which are expected to ignite and carry the second stage and payloads into orbit after the burn by the second stage main engine that did happen It was the world's first orbital launch attempt of a methane-fueled launch vehicle.

=== Space debris and satellites management ===
According to a space monitoring company, in January a Chinese satellite, SJ-21, grabbed an unused satellite and "threw" it into an orbit with a lower risk for the space debris to collide. In March, the IAU announced the Centre for the Protection of the Dark and Quiet Sky from Satellite Constellation Interference to coordinate or aggregate measures to mitigate the detrimental effects of satellite constellations on astronomy. On 4 March, for the first time, human space debris – most likely a spent rocket body, Long March 3C third stage from the 2014 Chang'e 5 T1 mission – unintentionally hit the lunar surface, creating an unexpected double crater.

=== Consequences of the 2022 Russian invasion of Ukraine ===
Following the Russian invasion of Ukraine on 24 February 2022, a large number of countries imposed further international sanctions against individuals, businesses and officials from Russia, Crimea and Belarus. Russia responded with sanctions against a number of countries. This led to tensions between the Russian space agency and its partners.

- The Soyuz at the Guiana Space Centre program has been suspended.
- Several Soyuz launches from the Baikonur Cosmodrome have been cancelled. Combined, six launches planned for OneWeb have been cancelled. The Russian space agency removed the flags of the United States and Japan from a Soyuz rocket.
- On 8 March, former NASA astronaut Scott Kelly declared he would give back his Russian spaceflight medal.
- The ESA/Roscosmos joint ExoMars 2022 mission to launch the Rosalind Franklin rover using the Kazachok lander to Mars was suspended and the launch cancelled in March 2022.
- The German component (eROSITA) of the joint German/Russian space telescope mission Spektr-RG was suspended on 26 February 2022.
- Russia announced it would stop delivering rocket engines to US and stop support (maintenance etc.) of engines already in the US.

== Orbital and Suborbital launches ==
Orbital launches by month
Month	Num. of successes	Num. of failures	Num. of partial failures
January	8	0	0
February	12	1	0
March	12	0	0
April	14	0	0
May	11	1	0
June	15	1	0
July	16	0	0
August	17	1	0
September	16	0	0
October	21	1	1
November	20	0	0
December	16	2	0
Total	178	7	1

== Deep-space rendezvous ==
Date (UTC)	Spacecraft	Event	Remarks
25 February	Parker Solar Probe	11th perihelion	Success
1 June	Parker Solar Probe	12th perihelion	Success
23 June	BepiColombo	Second gravity assist at Mercury	Success
3 September	Solar Orbiter	Third gravity assist at Venus	This is the first fly-by of Venus that increased Solar Orbiter's orbital inclination relative to the Sun.
6 September	Parker Solar Probe	13th perihelion	Success
26 September	Double Asteroid Redirection Test	Impact at a minor planet moon Dimorphos	DART kinetically impacted Dimorphos, the minor-planet moon of the 65803 Didymos binary asteroid system. It also performed a flyby of Didymos.
26 September	LICIACube	Flyby of asteroids	LICIACube flew by the 65803 Didymos binary asteroid system at a targeted altitude of 55 km (34 mi).
29 September	Juno	45th perijove	On this perijove, Juno flew by Europa at a distance of 352 km (219 mi). Orbital period around Jupiter reduced to 38 days.
16 October	Lucy	First gravity assist at Earth	Target altitude: 300 km (190 mi).
14 November	CAPSTONE	Lunar orbital insertion	First mission to use a Near-rectilinear halo orbit around the Moon
21 November	Artemis 1	Powered flyby of the Moon	Target altitude: 60 nmi (110 km)
25 November	Artemis 1	Distant Retrograde Orbit insertion at the Moon	Second mission ever to use a Distant Retrograde Orbit around the Moon
1 December	Artemis 1	Distant Retrograde Orbit departure burn	Spacecraft exited lunar orbit en route to an Earth return trajectory
5 December	Artemis 1	Powered flyby of the Moon	Target altitude 80.6 nmi (149.3 km)
11 December	Artemis 1	Splashdown at Earth	Success
11 December	Parker Solar Probe	14th perihelion	Success
15 December	Juno	47th perijove	Before this perijove, Juno flew by Io at a distance of 64,000 km (40,000 mi) on December 14.
16 December	Danuri	Lunar orbital insertion	Success

== Extravehicular activities (EVAs) ==
Start date/time	Duration	End time	Spacecraft	Crew	Remarks
19 January 2022; 12:17	7 hours, 11 minutes	19:28	Expedition 66 Poisk Airlock	(Russia) Anton Shkaplerov (Russia) Pyotr Dubrov	Spacewalk to connect the Prichal Node Module to the ISS. Tasks included: relocating the Strela crane over to Nauka so it can be used as a translation path for this spacewalk and the next one, connecting telemetry and power cables installing handrails, relocating television cameras and docking antennas, installing docking targets, and jettisoning unneeded hardware and trash.
15 March 2022; 12:11	6 hours, 54 minutes	19:06	Expedition 66; ISS Quest	(United States) Raja Chari (United States) Kayla Barron	First spacewalk to install the IROSA mounting brackets on the S4 Truss. Task included installing the struts, mounting brackets, and triangles at the 3A Array in preparation for the delivery of the IROSA solar arrays on SpaceX CRS-25 at the end of May. The astronauts also tied back insulation on S6 so Dextre can replace the Battery Charge Discharge Modules at this location which has shown signs of decay and will be replaced at a later date. As a get ahead the astronauts photographed a worn keel pin cover which has come loose on one of the pins that were used to secure the airlock in the shuttle bay when it was launched.
23 March 2022; 12:32	6 hours, 54 minutes	19:26	Expedition 66; ISS Quest	(United States) Raja Chari (Germany) Matthias Maurer	The astronauts will install and vent ammonia jumpers on the P1 Truss and reposition a radiator beam valve module which has been giving them trouble. The astronauts will also route cables, install cable clamps on the Bartolomeo platform, tie back thermal insulation on the Kibo Exposed Facility Berthing Mechanism, break torque on the P4 electronics boxes, replace Camera 8 on the truss which has a bad filter and light, outfit the radiator grapple bars for a future spacewalk, and also do other maintenance tasks outside the station.
18 April 2022; 14:01	6 hours, 37 minutes	21:37	Expedition 67 Poisk Airlock	(Russia) Oleg Artemyev (Russia) Denis Matveev	Third spacewalk in a series to activate Nauka and Prichal and to commission ERA. During the spacewalk the cosmonauts will remove covers and install electrical cables so ERA can be activated at the end of the spacewalk. They will also install handrails, experiments, and work platforms outside, and break torque on bolts that secure ERA to the lab.
28 April 2022; 10:58	7 hours, 42 minutes	18:40	Expedition 67 Poisk Airlock	(Russia) Oleg Artemyev (Russia) Denis Matveev	Fourth spacewalk in a series to activate Nauka and Prichal and to commission ERA. During the spacewalk the cosmonauts will jettison thermal cover, release launch locks, and lube the joints and the grapple fixtures before they walk off the arm to its stowage point on the side of the lab in preparation for its first grapple at the end of the spacewalk. Artemyev and Matveev completed their major objectives during the spacewalk, which included monitoring the first commanded movements of the robotic arm from its grapple fixtures after removing thermal blankets and launch locks. The duo monitored the robotic arm as its end effectors translated one at a time to a new base points. The crew also installed more handrails on Nauka multipurpose laboratory module. Shortly after the spacewalk ended, cosmonaut Sergey Korsakov completed the grapple of the second of the two end effectors on the new European Robotic Arm to a grapple mechanism on the Nauka module to successfully wrap up the major tasks of the excursion.
21 July 2022 14:50	7 hours, 5 minutes	21:55	Expedition 67 Poisk Airlock	(Russia) Oleg Artemyev (Italy) Samantha Cristoforetti	Russian cosmonaut Oleg Artemyev and Italian astronaut Samantha Cristoforetti worked on the ERA robotic arm as part of the work scheduled to commission the Nauka module and robotic arm. They launched two Tsiolkovsky-Ryazan (No. 1-2) and eight YUZGU-55 (No. 5-12) satellites, installed an ERA grapple point on Poisk to facilitate future relocation of the experiment airlock on the next spacewalk, translated a work platform over to Nauka, reconfigured ERA and set the control panel from grapple mode to stowed, replaced a camera port window on ERA that prevented grappling on the previous spacewalk, replaced MLI blankets on Nauka that were knocked loose by the thruster firings when the module arrived, and installed retainers on Strela 1 on Poisk. The final task to relocate Strela 2 on Zarya over to Poisk and install its retainer was deferred to the next spacewalk because they ran out of time and they had a late start. Cristoforetti become the first female European astronaut to perform a spacewalk, and only the third woman to perform a spacewalk using the Russian Orlan spacesuit (after Svetlana Savitskaya and Peggy Whitson).
17 August 2022; 13:53	4 hours, 1 minute	17:54	Expedition 67 Poisk Airlock	(Russia) Oleg Artemyev (Russia) Denis Matveev	Sixth spacewalk in a series to outfit Nauka and to prepare the Russian Segment for module transfers which will take place in the fall. The primary task to install cameras on the elbow joint was completed on time and both cameras passed their telemetry checkouts. The final tasks to relocate the ERA control panel, set the arm back to "grapple mode", and remove the launch rings from the wrist of ERA will be moved to the next spacewalk. Artemyev was in the process of removing the launch ring at worksite 2 from ERA when he suffered a voltage drop in his spacesuit batteries. Mission Control Moscow ordered him back inside the airlock where he connected to internal power to recharge his suit. Because they were ahead and then behind the timeline, in light of the battery issue Mission Control Moscow gave the order to terminate the EVA at 16:34 GMT and the spacewalk concluded at 17:54 GMT, 4 hours and 1 minute into the spacewalk. Artemyev was never in any danger and they will be replacing the battery before the next spacewalk. Because of the early EVA termination, the getahead task to relocate Strela 2 over to Poisk was also moved to the next spacewalk along with the other tasks.
1 September 2022; 10:26	6 hours, 7 minutes	16:33	Shenzhou 14 TSS Wentian airlock	(China) Chen Dong (China) Liu Yang	The spacewalkers completed a series of tasks including installing an additional pump on the exterior, raising panoramic camera B, installing a workbench, demonstrating emergency return, etc. This is the first time the Wentian airlock was used, and it will be used for all future spacewalks.
2 September 2022; 13:25	7 hours 47 minutes	21:12	Expedition 67 Poisk Airlock	(Russia) Oleg Artemyev (Russia) Denis Matveev	Seventh in a series of spacewalks to outfit Nauka and to prepare ERA for operations. The spacewalkers completed the tasks that were moved from the previous two spacewalks and installed two payload adapters on Nauka. Because of time and the lack of consumables the task to break torque on bolts that secure the airlock and the radiator to Rassvet was deferred to the next spacewalk. This was the longest EVA of Expedition 67 and the final one of this mission.
17 September 2022; 05:35	4 hours 12 minutes	09:47	Shenzhou 14 TSS Wentian airlock	(China) Chen Dong (China) Cai Xuzhe	The spacewalkers completed a series of tasks, including the completion of the installation of foot limiters and extravehicular workbenches, and will follow up with the support of the small robotic arm, and cooperate with each other to carry out the installation of the outboard booster handle, the installation of the load circuit expansion pump set, and the verification of the outboard rescue.
15 November 2022; 14:14	7 hours 11 minutes	21:25	Expedition 68; ISS Quest	(United States) Josh Cassada (United States) Frank Rubio	Cassada and Rubio installed the final IROSA mounting bracket on the S6 Truss at Array 1B. As part of get-ahead tasks, they prepared the 3A mounting bracket at P4 for the delivery of two IROSAs on the 18th and routed cables along the truss to be mated at the end of EVA 3. Because of time they did not install the slip collars on S6 and the cable routing was partly completed. The S6 cables will be routed on a later spacewalk when IROSA arrives.
17 November 2022; 03:16	5 hours 34 minutes	08:50	Shenzhou 14 TSS Wentian airlock	(China) Chen Dong (China) Cai Xuzhe	The spacewalkers completed a series of tasks, including the installation of a connection device between Tianhe core cabin and Wentian experimental cabin, inter-chamber connection device between Tianhe core cabin and Mengtian experimental cabin, lifting of panoramic camera A of Wentian experimental cabin and installation of small mechanical arm power-assisted handle.
17 November 2022; 14:39	6 hours 25 minutes	21:07	Expedition 68 Poisk Airlock	(Russia) Sergey Prokopyev (Russia) Dmitry Petelin	Eighth in a series of spacewalks to outfit Nauka and to prepare ERA for operations. The spacewalkers changed a grapple fixture so the airlock can be used as a base point for the arm, broke torque on bolts that secure the airlock and radiator to Rassvet, removed launch restraints from the radiator, vented nitrogen jumpers, replaced a retainer on Strela 2 with one that has a stop, and transferred a MLM outfitting work platform called the SKKO that is, the Nauka Means of attachment of large payloads over to Nauka and installed it at the ERA base point facing aft where ERA used to be, when it was launched.
3 December 2022; 12:16	7 hours 5 minutes	19:21	Expedition 68; ISS Quest	(United States) Josh Cassada (United States) Frank Rubio	Assisted by Canadarm 2, Cassada and Rubio installed an IROSA at Array 3A and connected it to the US power system. The spacewalkers undid bolts and installed cables and at 17:37 GMT the array was deployed and is receiving power. As part of get-ahead tasks, they prepared the 4A array for the next spacewalk, demated the 1B array, broke torque on the P4 electronic boxes, and installed cables along the truss to be mated at the end of EVA 5. Spacewalk faced a delay when Cassada's suit did not power up. Troubleshooting steps were done and power was restored to Cassada's suit so they could continue the spacewalk. Nick Hague was ground IV.
22 December 2022; 13:19	7 hours 8 minutes	20:27	Expedition 68; ISS Quest	(United States) Josh Cassada (United States) Frank Rubio	Assisted by Canadarm 2, Rubio and Cassada will install the fourth IROSA at Array 4A. Task include releasing bolts, installing cables, and deploying the array and connecting it to the US power system. Once these task are complete Rubio and Cassada will stow the array stowage beams on the carrier and remove their foot restraints from the arm in perpetration for astronaut Nicole Mann to grapple the carrier and load it into the trunk of SpaceX CRS-26 for disposal. If they have time they will photograph Soyuz MS-22 which has suffered a cooling leak in its primary radiator.

== Space debris events ==
Date/Time (UTC)	Source object	Event type	Pieces tracked	Remarks
12 November	(China) Long March 6A upper stage	Breakup	781	Energetic fragmentation event; Cause Unknown; but may be related to upper stage passivization or insulation. It later expanded from its initial 50 pieces to 350 and subsequently 781 pieces.
17 November	(Japan) H2-A 202 Payload fairing	Breakup	50+	Energetic fragmentation event; Cause Unknown

== Orbital launch statistics ==
=== By country ===
For the purposes of this section, the yearly tally of orbital launches by country assigns each flight to the country of origin of the launch vehicle, not to the launch services provider or the spaceport. For example, Soyuz launches by Arianespace in Kourou are counted under Russia because Soyuz-2 is a Russian launch vehicle.

Country	Launches	Successes	Failures	Partial failures
China	64	62	2	0
France	3	3	0	0
India	5	4	1	0
Iran	1	1	0	0
Italy	2	1	1	0
Japan	1	0	1	0
Russia	22 (Note: Includes Soyuz launches from Kourou and Baikonur)	22	0	0
South Korea	1	1	0	0
United States	87 (Note: Includes Electron launches from Māhia)	84	2	1
World	186	178	7	1

=== By rocket ===
- Ariane 5
- Rocket 3
- Atlas V
- Electron
- Falcon 9 new
- Falcon 9 reused
- Falcon Heavy
- Kuaizhou 1A
- Kuaizhou 11
- Long March 2
- Long March 3
- Long March 4
- Long March 5
- Long March 6
- Long March 7
- Long March 8
- Long March 11
- PSLV
- Soyuz-2
- Soyuz-2-1v
- Soyuz-ST
- Angara 1.2
- Antares 230+
- Ceres-1
- LauncherOne
- Vega C
- Others

==== By family ====
Family	Country	Launches	Successes	Failures	Partial failures	Remarks
Alpha	United States	1	0	0	1	
Angara	Russia	2	2	0	0	
Antares	United States	2	2	0	0	
Ariane	France	3	3	0	0	
Astra	United States	3	1	2	0	
Atlas	United States	7	7	0	0	
Ceres	China	2	2	0	0	
Delta	United States	1	1	0	0	
Electron	United States	9	9	0	0	
Epsilon	Japan	1	0	1	0	
Falcon	United States	61	61	0	0	
Hyperbola	China	1	0	1	0	
Jielong	China	1	1	0	0	
Kinetica	China	1	1	0	0	Maiden flight
Kuaizhou	China	5	5	0	0	
LauncherOne	United States	2	2	0	0	
Long March	China	53	53	0	0	
LVM 3	India	1	1	0	0	
Nuri	South Korea	1	1	0	0	
PSLV	India	3	3	0	0	
R-7	Russia	19	19	0	0	
Safir	Iran	1	1	0	0	
SSLV	India	1	0	1	0	Maiden flight
SLS	United States	1	1	0	0	Maiden flight
UR	Russia	1	1	0	0	
Vega	Italy	2	1	1	0	
Zhuque	China	1	0	1	0	Maiden flight

==== By type ====
Rocket	Country	Family	Launches	Successes	Failures	Partial failures	Remarks
Alpha	United States	Alpha	1	0	0	1	
Angara 1.2	Russia	Angara	2	2	0	0	Maiden flight
Antares 200	United States	Antares	2	2	0	0	
Ariane 5	France	Ariane	3	3	0	0	
Atlas V	United States	Atlas	7	7	0	0	
Ceres-1	China	Ceres	2	2	0	0	
Delta IV	United States	Delta	1	1	0	0	
Electron	United States	Electron	9	9	0	0	
Epsilon	Japan	Epsilon	1	0	1	0	
Falcon 9	United States	Falcon	61	61	0	0	
Hyperbola-1	China	Hyperbola	1	0	1	0	
Jielong-3	China	Jielong	1	1	0	0	Maiden flight
Kinetica-1	China	Kinetica	1	1	0	0	Maiden flight
Kuaizhou	China	Kuaizhou	5	5	0	0	
LauncherOne	United States	LauncherOne	2	2	0	0	
LVM 3	India	LVM 3	1	1	0	0	
Long March 2	China	Long March	24	24	0	0	
Long March 3	China	Long March	4	4	0	0	
Long March 4	China	Long March	11	11	0	0	
Long March 5	China	Long March	2	2	0	0	
Long March 6	China	Long March	4	4	0	0	
Long March 7	China	Long March	3	3	0	0	
Long March 8	China	Long March	1	1	0	0	
Long March 11	China	Long March	4	4	0	0	
Nuri	South Korea	Nuri	1	1	0	0	
PSLV	India	PSLV	3	3	0	0	
Proton	Russia	UR	1	1	0	0	
Qased	Iran	Safir	1	1	0	0	
Rocket 3	United States	Astra	3	1	2	0	Final flight
SSLV	India	SSLV	1	0	1	0	Maiden flight
Soyuz-2	Russia	R-7	19	19	0	0	
SLS	United States	SLS	1	1	0	0	Maiden flight
Vega	Italy	Vega	2	1	1	0	
Zhuque-2	China	Zhuque	1	0	1	0	Maiden flight

==== By configuration ====
Rocket	Country	Type	Launches	Successes	Failures	Partial failures	Remarks
Alpha	United States	Alpha	1	0	0	1	
Angara 1.2	Russia	Angara 1.2	2	2	0	0	Maiden flight
Antares 230+	United States	Antares 200	2	2	0	0	
Ariane 5 ECA	France	Ariane 5	3	3	0	0	
Atlas V 401	United States	Atlas V	1	1	0	0	Final flight
Atlas V 421	United States	Atlas V	1	1	0	0	Final flight
Atlas V 511	United States	Atlas V	1	1	0	0	Only flight
Atlas V 531	United States	Atlas V	1	1	0	0	Final flight
Atlas V 541	United States	Atlas V	2	2	0	0	Final flight
Atlas V N22	United States	Atlas V	1	1	0	0	
Ceres-1	China	Ceres-1	2	2	0	0	
Delta IV Heavy	United States	Delta IV	1	1	0	0	
Electron	United States	Electron	9	9	0	0	
Epsilon	Japan	Epsilon	1	0	1	0	
Falcon 9 Block 5	United States	Falcon 9	60	60	0	0	
Falcon Heavy	United States	Falcon 9	1	1	0	0	
Hyperbola-1	China	Hyperbola-1	1	0	1	0	
Kuaizhou 1A	China	Kuaizhou	4	4	0	0	
Jielong-3	China	Jielong-3	1	1	0	0	Maiden flight
Kuaizhou 11	China	Kuaizhou	1	1	0	0	
LauncherOne	United States	LauncherOne	2	2	0	0	
LVM 3	India	LVM 3	1	1	0	0	
Long March 2C	China	Long March 2	6	6	0	0	
Long March 2D	China	Long March 2	15	15	0	0	
Long March 2F/G	China	Long March 2	2	2	0	0	
Long March 2F/T	China	Long March 2	1	1	0	0	
Long March 3B/E	China	Long March 3	3	3	0	0	
Long March 3B/E / YZ-1	China	Long March 3	1	1	0	0	
Long March 4B	China	Long March 4	2	2	0	0	
Long March 4C	China	Long March 4	9	9	0	0	
Long March 5B	China	Long March 5	2	2	0	0	
Long March 6	China	Long March 6	2	2	0	0	
Long March 6A	China	Long March 6	2	2	0	0	Maiden flight
Long March 7	China	Long March 7	2	2	0	0	
Long March 7A	China	Long March 7	1	1	0	0	
Long March 8	China	Long March 8	1	1	0	0	
Long March 11	China	Long March 11	4	4	0	0	
Nuri	South Korea	Nuri	1	1	0	0	
PSLV-XL	India	PSLV	2	2	0	0	
PSLV-CA	India	PSLV	1	1	0	0	
Proton-M / DM-03	Russia	Proton	1	1	0	0	
Qased	Iran	Qased	1	1	0	0	
Rocket 3	United States	Rocket 3	3	1	2	0	Final flight
SSLV	India	SSLV	1	0	1	0	Maiden flight
Soyuz-2.1a	Russia	Soyuz-2	6	6	0	0	
Soyuz-2.1a / Fregat-M or ST-A	Russia	Soyuz-2	2	2	0	0	
Soyuz-2.1b	Russia	Soyuz-2	2	2	0	0	
Soyuz-2.1b / Fregat-M or ST-B	Russia	Soyuz-2	7	7	0	0	
Soyuz-2-1v / Volga	Russia	Soyuz-2	2	2	0	0	
SLS Block 1	United States	SLS	1	1	0	0	Maiden flight
Vega C	Italy	Vega	2	1	1	0	Maiden flight
Zhuque-2	China	Zhuque-2	1	0	1	0	Maiden flight
Kinetica-1	China	Kinetica-1	1	1	0	0	Maiden flight

=== By spaceport ===
- East China Sea
- Jiuquan
- Taiyuan
- Wenchang
- Xichang
- Yellow Sea
- Kourou
- Satish Dhawan
- Shahroud
- Uchinoura
- Baikonur
- Mahia
- Plesetsk
- Vostochny
- Naro
- Cape Canaveral
- Kennedy
- MARS
- Mojave
- PSCA
- Vandenberg

Site	Country	Launches	Successes	Failures	Partial failures	Remarks
Baikonur	Kazakhstan	7	7	0	0	
Cape Canaveral	United States	38	36	2	0	
East China Sea	China	1	1	0	0	
Jiuquan	China	25	23	2	0	
Kennedy	United States	19	19	0	0	
Kourou	France	6	5	1	0	
Māhia	New Zealand	9	9	0	0	
MARS	United States	2	2	0	0	
Mojave	United States	2	2	0	0	
Naro	South Korea	1	1	0	0	
PSCA	United States	1	1	0	0	
Plesetsk	Russia	13	13	0	0	
Satish Dhawan	India	5	4	1	0	
Shahroud	Iran	1	1	0	0	
Taiyuan	China	14	14	0	0	
Uchinoura	Japan	1	0	1	0	
Vandenberg	United States	16	15	0	1	
Vostochny	Russia	1	1	0	0	
Wenchang	China	6	6	0	0	
Xichang	China	16	16	0	0	
Yellow Sea	China	2	2	0	0	
Total		186	178	7	1	

=== By orbit ===
- Transatmospheric
- Low Earth
- Low Earth (ISS)
- Low Earth (CSS)
- Low Earth (SSO)
- Low Earth (retrograde)
- Medium Earth
- Molniya
- Geosynchronous
- Tundra
- Lunar transfer
- Heliocentric

Orbital regime	Launches	Achieved	Not achieved	Accidentally achieved	Remarks
Transatmospheric	0	0	0	1	SSLV-D1 was intended to reach low Earth orbit, but achieved a transatmospheric orbit instead
Low Earth / Sun-synchronous	154	147	7	0	Including flights to ISS and Tiangong
Geosynchronous / Tundra / GTO	23	23	0	0	
Medium Earth / Molniya	6	6	0	0	
High Earth / Lunar transfer	1	1	0	0	
Heliocentric orbit / Planetary transfer	2	2	0	0	
Total	186	179	7	1	

== Suborbital launch statistics ==
=== By country ===
For the purposes of this section, the yearly tally of suborbital launches by country assigns each flight to the country of origin of the rocket, not to the launch services provider or the spaceport. Flights intended to fly below 80 km (50 mi) are omitted.

Country	Launches	Successes	Failures	Partial failures
Brazil	3	3	0	0
Canada	11	11	0	0
China	16	16	0	0
India	8	8	0	0
Iran	5	5	0	0
Israel	5	3	0	0
Japan	2	2	0	0
Netherlands	3	2	1	0
North Korea	21	21	0	0
Pakistan	1	1	0	0
Russia	8	8	0	0
Slovenia	1	0	0	1
South Korea	6	5	1	0
Turkey	1	1	0	0
United Kingdom	1	0	1	0
United States	35 (Note: 3 crewed flights)	31	4	0
Yemen	5	5	0	0
World	131	122	7	1

== See also ==
- List of commanders of the International Space Station
