= DF-15 =

Short-range ballistic missile

Dong Feng 15
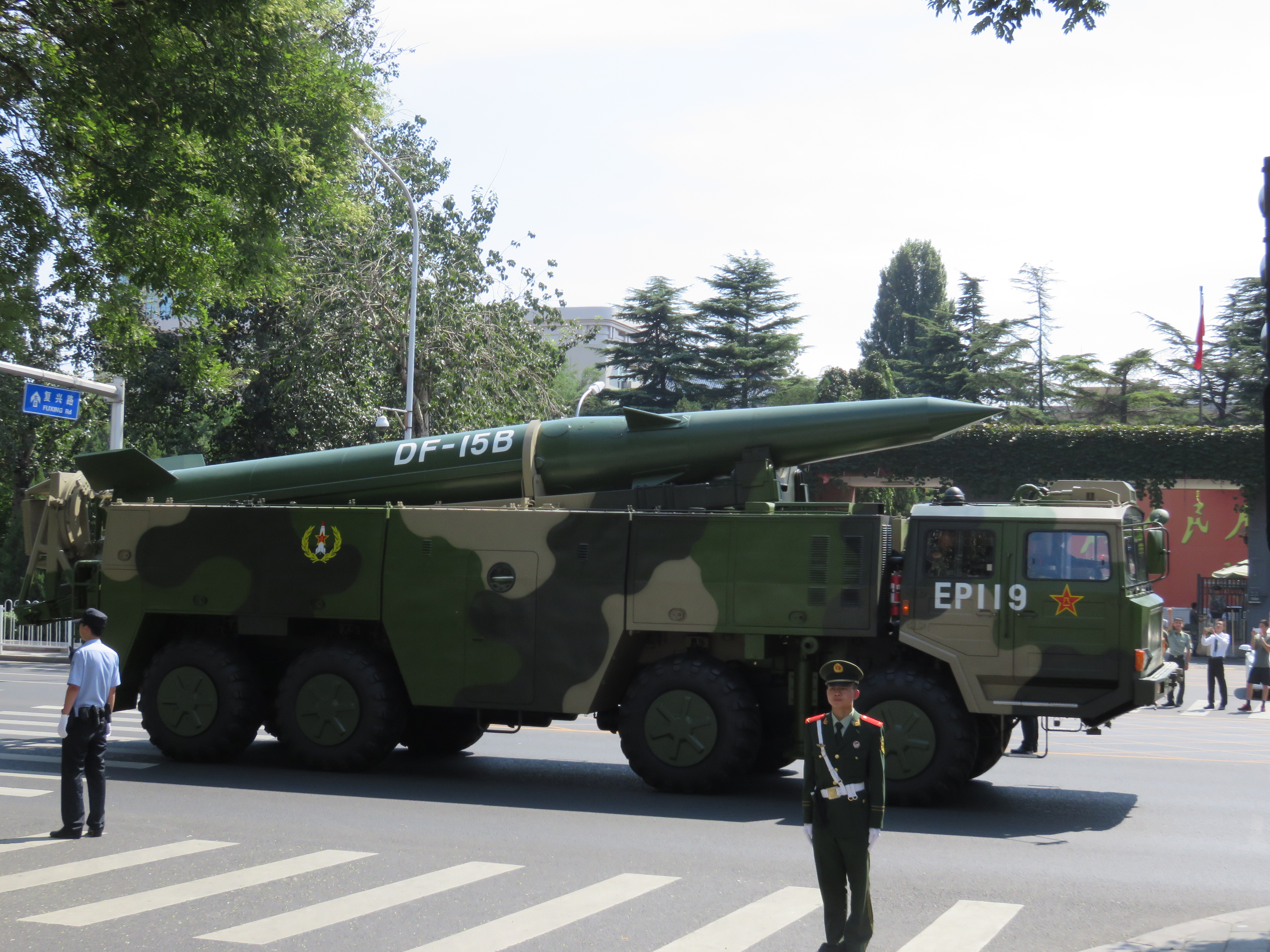
- Type: SRBM

Service history
- In service: 1990–present
- Used by: China

Production history
- Manufacturer: Academy of Rocket Motors Technology

Specifications
- Mass: 6,200 kg
- Length: 9.1 m
- Diameter: 1.0 m
- Warhead: Nuclear 50-350 Kt, or conventional Maneuverable reentry vehicles
- Blast yield: 90 kt
- Engine: Single-stage solid-propellant rocket
- Operational range: 600 km (370 mi) (DF-15); 900 km (560 mi) (DF-15A); 800 km (500 mi) (DF-15B); 700 km (430 mi) (DF-15C)
- Guidance system: Astro-inertial guidance (including ring-laser gyroscope) + Beidou
- Accuracy: 100-300 m
- Launch platform: Road-mobile TEL

The Dong-Feng 15 (abbreviated as DF-15, also referred to as the M-9 and CSS-6) is a short-range ballistic missile developed by China. The United States Department of Defense estimated in 2008 that China had 315–355 DF-15 missiles and 90–110 launchers.

== History ==
Development on the DF-15 began in 1985 with a finalized design proposal being approved by the PLA in 1987. From the late 1980s to the mid-1990s, testing of the missile was done in the Gobi Desert. The first public display of the missile took place at the Beijing Defense Exposition in 1986. The Second Artillery Corps had allegedly deployed a small number of the missiles the following year.

In 1989, Libya agreed to finance Syria's purchase of M-9 missiles from China. The sale of missiles to Syria were cancelled under US pressure in 1991.

On 14 September 2026 Saudi Arabia launched a few DF-15s into Yemen in response to the South Yemen offensive by Houthi forces. The launch from Marib is the first confirmed use of the DF-15 by Saudi forces, thus confirming their purchase.

== Description ==
The DF-15 uses a solid fuel, single-stage rocket. It is vertically launched from an eight-wheeled transporter erector launcher (TEL). The missile's trajectory is guided using small thrusters and an inertial guidance system on the warhead. The warhead is only a tenth of the size of the missile body. After the body and warhead separate, the body trails behind to camouflage the warhead. The terminal velocity of the missile is over Mach 6. It can deliver a 500–750 kg (1,100–1,650 lb) payload up to 600 kilometres (370 mi), with accuracy of 300 m circular error probability (CEP).

The DF-15A is a variant that employs control fins at the rear of the missile and on the reentry vehicle, GPS updates, and terminal radar guidance. Its payload is believed to be 600 kg (1,300 lb) with a range of 900 km (560 mi) and improved accuracy of 30–45 m CEP. The DF-15B is a further upgraded variant with similar features, as well as an active radar seeker, laser rangefinder, and maneuverable reentry vehicle. It is capable of ranges between 50–800 km (31–497 mi) with greater accuracy of 5–10 m CEP.

The DF-15C is a bunker buster variant equipped with a deep-penetration warhead, with a range of 700 km (430 mi) and accuracy of 15–20 m CEP. It was originally designed with the capability of destroying the Heng Shan Military Command Center in Taiwan's capital of Taipei, which was built to withstand a 20 kiloton nuclear blast, a 2 kiloton conventional bomb blast, or an electromagnetic pulse; another target would be Chiashan Air Force Base. In the event of an invasion, the destruction of Taiwan's major command center would make it difficult to coordinate defenses. The missile's range also reaches locations as far as Kyushu in Japan, US military bases in Okinawa and the Indian capital of New Delhi.

== Operators ==
=== Current ===
- China
- Saudi Arabia

== See also ==
- DF-16

Preceded by ?	DF-15; 1990–present	Succeeded by DF-16
