= Low-Earth Orbit Flight Test of an Inflatable Decelerator =

NASA mission

Low-Earth Orbit Flight Test of an Inflatable Decelerator (LOFTID)
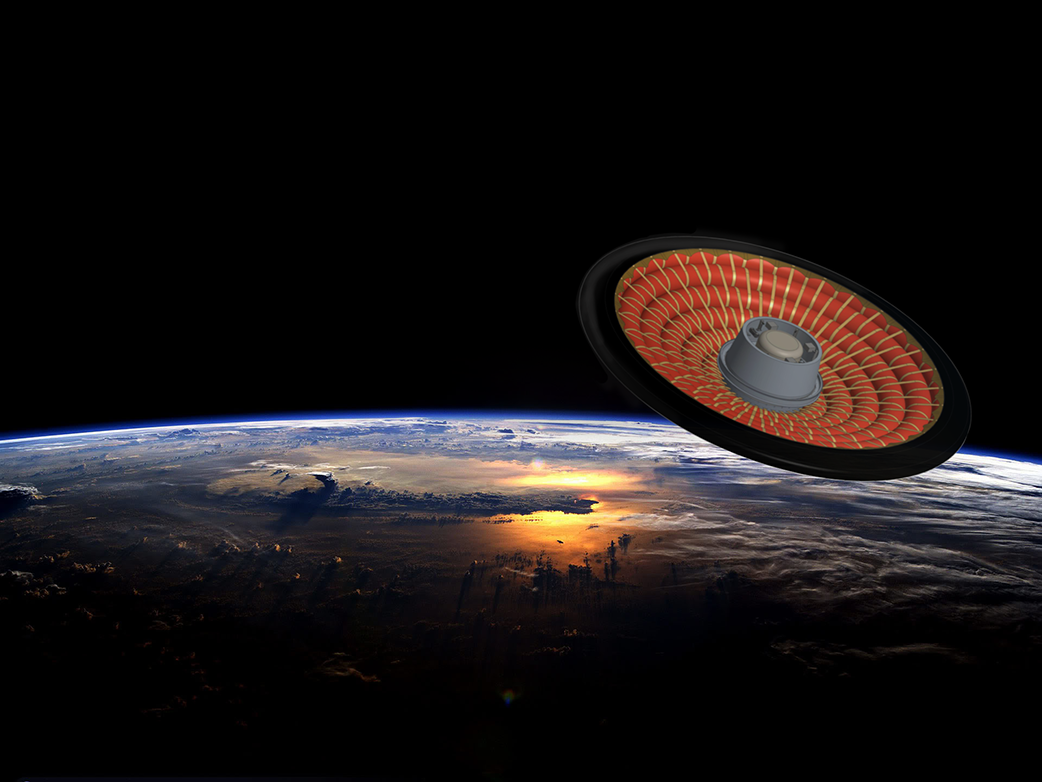
- Illustration of LOFTID In Space
- Mission type: Inflatable decelerator
- Operator: NASA
- COSPAR ID: 2022-150C
- SATCAT no.: none
- Mission duration: 2 hours, 11 minutes

Start of mission
- Launch date: November 10, 2022
- Rocket: Atlas V 401

End of mission
- Landing date: November 10, 2022
- Landing site: Pacific Ocean

Low-Earth Orbit Flight Test of an Inflatable Decelerator (LOFTID) was a NASA mission to test inflatable reentry systems. It was the first such test of an inflatable decelerator from Earth-orbital speed.

LOFTID was launched on an Atlas V 401 in November 2022 as a secondary payload, along with the JPSS-2 weather satellite. It deployed successfully and landed in the ocean near Hawaii on November 10, 2022, which NASA stated on November 17 was a "huge success".

== History ==
LOFTID is the latest in a string of successful Hypersonic Inflatable Aerodynamic Decelerator (HIAD) development efforts. HIADs have a Viking-era genesis; developed by engineers at the NASA Langley Research Center as a possible system for crewed reentry. However, HIAD development ceased in the mid-1970s when it was shown disk-gap-band supersonic parachutes were suitable for the Viking, Pioneer Venus and Galileo mission environments. More recently, the need to enable robotic and crewed missions with larger payload mass has generated new investment in HIAD development. Starting in 2006 with the Program to Advance Inflatable Decelerators for Atmospheric Entry (PAIDAE), HIADs have undergone a series of incremental development efforts including design and analysis, ground based materials testing, manufacturing, wind-tunnel testing and flight tests and demonstrations. Two successful NASA Langley Research Center led sub-orbital flight demonstrations of HIAD technology have occurred; Inflatable Reentry Vehicle Experiment 2 (IRVE-2) and IRVE-3 were flown in 2009 and 2012 respectively. LOFTID is the first orbital flight of a HIAD and the largest blunt aeroshell entry to date.

== Design ==
It inflates to 6 metres (about 20 feet) in diameter. Its total mass is about 2,400 lb (1,000 kg).

It is formed from 7 inflatable tori (6 wide and one narrow), with a flexible woven silicon carbide black ceramic fabric thermal protection layer on one side.

== Launch, deployment, and results ==
Launch and deployment (inflation, separation and splashdown from the Atlas V Centaur 2nd stage) were successful.

It reentered the atmosphere at about Mach 29, reached a peak deceleration of about 9 g, and splashed down under a subsonic parachute near Hawaii. NASA stated on November 17 that LOFTID was a "huge success" and able to be used on future missions to Mars.

According to the principal investigator, Dr. Neil Cheatwood, the success means the technology is now ready to use on missions.

== Commercial interest ==
Dr. Cheatwood reports that about a dozen companies have contacted him to express interest in the technology.

== See also ==
- Inflatable decelerator, including NASA's IRVE and HIAD
