= List of schools in Fengtai, Beijing =

This is a list of schools in Fengtai District, Beijing.

== Secondary schools ==
Note: In China the word 中学 zhōngxué, literally translated as "middle school", refers to any secondary school and differs from the American usage of the term "middle school" to mean specifically a lower secondary school or junior high school. 初中 chūzhōng is used to refer to a lower secondary school.

- Beijing City Dacheng School (北京市大成学校)
- Beijing City Xiluoyuan School (北京市西罗园学校)
- Beijing City Youanmenwai Foreign Language School (北京市右安门外国语学校)
- Beijing No. 4 High School Puti School (北京四中璞瑅学校)
- Beijing No. 10 High School (北京市第十中学) - Main campus and East Campus (东校区)
- Beijing No. 12 High School - Main Campus, Beijing South Railway Station Campus (南站校区), and Zhongkefeng Campus (中科丰校区)
- Beijing No. 18 High School (北京市第十八中学) - Main Campus, and Ximajinrun Campus (西马金润校区)
- Beijing City Capital Normal University Affiliated Lize High School (北京市首都师范大学附属丽泽中学) - Main Campus, and South Campus (南校区)
- Beijing City Fangxing High School (北京市芳星园中学)
- Beijing City Hangtian High School (北京市航天中学)
- Beijing City Tonglin High School (北京市佟麟阁中学)
- Beijing City Zhaodengyu School (北京市赵登禹学校) - Headquarters (本部)
- Beijing Education Science Research Institute Fengtai School (北京教育科学研究院丰台学校)
- Beijing Education Science Research Institute Fengtai Institute Affiliated School (北京教育学院丰台分院附属学校 )
- Beijing Institute of Education Affiliated Fengtai Experimental School (北京教育学院附属丰台实验学校) - Main School, and Branch School (分校)
- Beijing City Fengtai District Heyi School (北京市丰台区和义学校)
- Beijing City Fengtai District Huaishuling School (北京市丰台区槐树岭学校)
- Beijing City Fengtai District Zhangxindian School (北京市丰台区长辛店学校)
- Beijing City Fengtai District No. 2 High School (北京市丰台区丰台第二中学) - Main Campus, and Junior High School Division (初中部)
- Beijing City Fengtai No. 8 High School (北京市丰台第八中学) - Beidadi Campus (北大地校区), Zhonghai Campus (中海校区), and Zuoanmen Branch School (左安门分校)
- Beijing City Fengtai District Huangtugang High School (北京市丰台区黄土岗中学)
- Beijing City Fengtai District Kandan High School (北京市丰台区看丹中学)
- Beijing City Fengtai District Lugouqiao (Marco Polo Bridge) High School (北京市丰台区卢沟桥中学)
- Beijing City Fengtai District Nanyuan High School (北京市丰台区南苑中学)
- Beijing City Fengtai District Tiejiangying No. 1 High School (北京市丰台区东铁匠营第一中学)
- Beijing City Fengtai District Tiejiangying No. 2 High School (北京市丰台区东铁匠营第二中学)
- Beijing City Fengtai District Zhangxindian No. 1 High School (北京市丰台区长辛店第一中学)
- Beijing City Fengtai District Part-time High School (北京市丰台区工读学校)
- Beijing Normal University No. 4 Affiliated High School (北京师范大学第四附属中学) - Junior High School (初中) and Senior High School (高中)
- Capital Normal University Affiliated Yungang High School (首都师范大学附属云岗中学)
- Capital University of Economics and Business Affiliated High School (首都经济贸易大学附属中学)
- China Education Science Research Institute Fengtai Experimental School (中国教育科学研究院丰台实验学校)
- High School Affiliated to Minzu University of China Fengtai Experimental School (丰台实验学校)
- High School Affiliated to Renmin University of China Fengtai School (丰台学校)
- Tsinghua University High School Fengtai School (丰台学校) - Secondary School Division (中学部)

== Primary schools ==
- China Education Science Research Institute Fengtai Experimental School (中国教育科学研究院丰台实验学校) - Primary Division One (小学一部) and Primary Division Two (小学二部)
- Tsinghua University High School Fengtai School (丰台学校) - Primary School Division (小学部)
- Beijing Fengtai District Wuaitun Primary School (北京市丰台区五爱屯小学)
