= Heng Shan Military Command Center =

Command center in Taiwan

Heng Shan Military Command Center (Chinese: 衡山指揮所) is an underground tri-service command center in Dazhi, Zhongshan District, Taipei, Taiwan. It is the highest level military command center in Taiwan during peace and war.

== History ==
The construction of the command center began in 1960. This involved excavation of a mountain in the Taipei suburb of Dazhi (formerly spelled Tachih), and it was only completed in 1982.

== Design ==
The command center was built to withstand attack from ballistic missiles and is connected to numerous other command posts and military bases via tunnels. It also has office space for various government agencies, cabinet and the president to be used during war.
