= PocketQube =

Type of miniaturized satellite

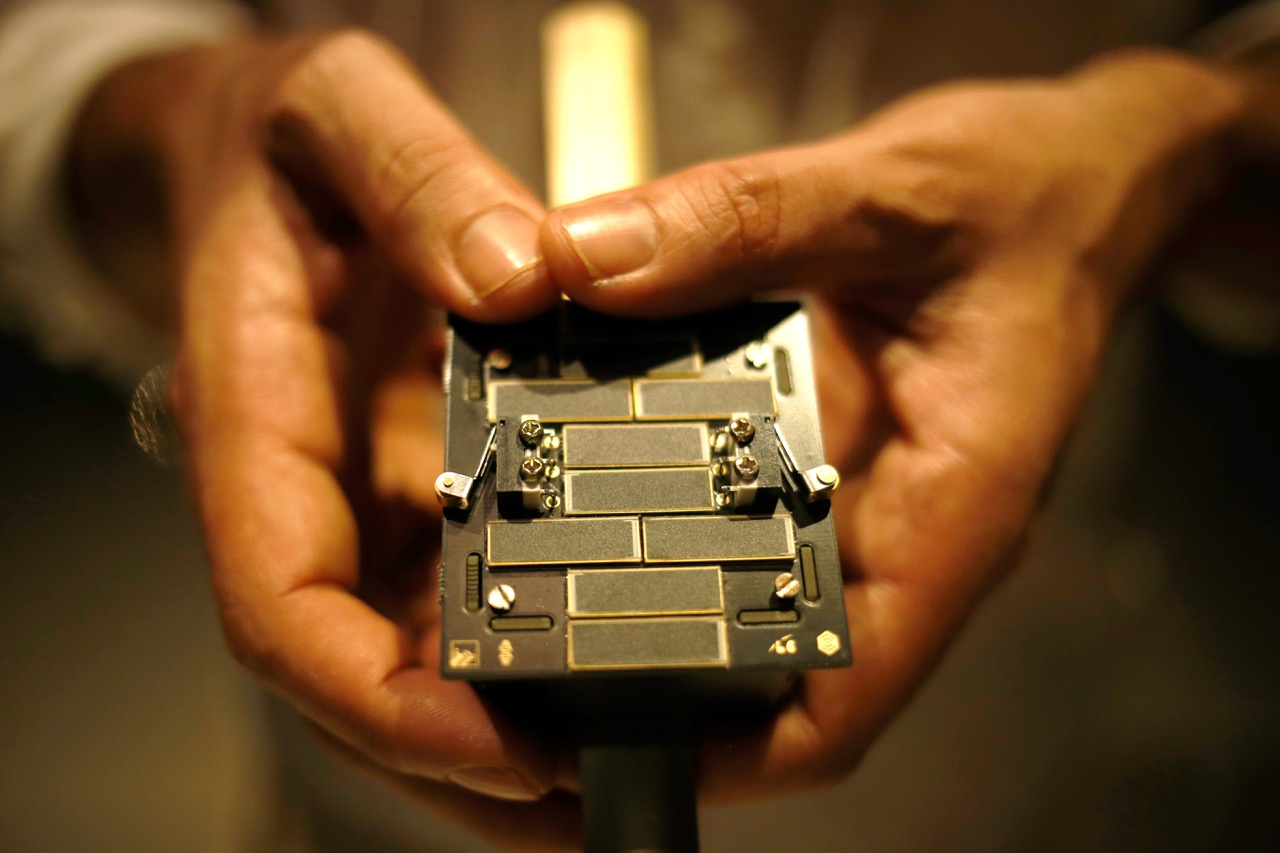

Specifications
- Launch mass: 250 g
- Dimensions: 5 × 5 × 5 cm (1p)

A PocketQube is a type of miniaturized satellite for space research that usually has a size of cube with 5 cm sides (one eighth the volume of a CubeSat), has a mass of no more than 250 grams, and typically uses commercial off-the-shelf components for its electronics.

Beginning in 2009, Morehead State University (MSU) and Kentucky Space developed the PocketQube specifications to help universities worldwide to perform space science and exploration. While the bulk of development comes from academia, several companies build PocketQubes, such as Fossa Systems and Alba Orbital. PocketQube projects have even been the subject of Kickstarter campaigns. The PocketQube format is also popular with amateur radio satellite builders.

== Design ==
The PocketQube specification accomplishes several high-level goals. Simplification makes it possible to design and produce a workable satellite at low cost. Encapsulation of the launcher-payload interface takes away the prohibitive amount of managerial work previously required for mating a piggyback satellite with its launcher. Unification among payloads and launchers enables quick exchanges of payloads and utilization of launch opportunities on short notice. PocketQube is similar to CubeSat in this regard.

The standard was first proposed by Professor Bob Twiggs of Morehead State University, and the intention was for a satellite which could fit in a pocket, hence the name PocketQube.

== Workshops ==
The first US workshop was held at NASA Ames and at Cape Canaveral in April 2014. There was a three-year gap until the next PocketQube workshop was held at TU Delft in The Netherlands in March 2017. The third workshop took place also at TU Delft in March 2018, with 22 presentations and 70 attendees. This is now an annual event for the PocketQube development community. In 2023 it was rebranded to the PocketQube conference to reflect the growth in the PocketQube community. It is held annually at the Glasgow University Union (GUU), in Glasgow, Scotland.

== Launched ==
Listed in ascending order by launch date.

– Indicates low altitude launch.

| Orbital No | Name | Type | Organisation | Mission | Launch Date (UTC) | Rocket | Mission Status | Broker | Decay date |
|---|---|---|---|---|---|---|---|---|---|
| 1 | (United States) Beakersat-1 (Note: Also known as T-LogoQube, MagPocketQube, Eagle-1) | 2.5p | Morehead State University, Sonoma State University | Teaching Tool | 2013-11-21, 07:11 | Dnepr | No longer in orbit | GAUSS | Decay: 2019-2-13 |
| 2 | (United States) $50Sat (Eagle-2) | 1.5p | Amateur Group | Amateur Mission | 2013-11-21, 07:11 | Dnepr | No longer in orbit | GAUSS | Decay: 2018-5-18 |
| 3 | (United States) QubeScout-S1 | 2.5p | University of Maryland, Baltimore County | Sensor/dynamic attitude experiments | 2013-11-21, 07:11 | Dnepr | Deployed | GAUSS | |
| 4 | (Germany) WREN | 1p | Stadoko UG | Tech demo, Camera SSTV, 3 Axis Reaction Wheel and pp Thrusters | 2013-11-21, 07:11 | Dnepr | Deployed | GAUSS | |
| | (Canada) Astria | 5p | BCIT Satellite Launch Program | Test structural feasibility at 30,000 feet for new design | 2018-6-21 | UBC Black Tusk | Launch failure | UBC | Suborbital: 2018-6-21 |
| | (United States) TQube | 1p | Amateur | Insulation testing and recording of structural dynamics | 2019-10-11, 18:37 | Neutron | Success | TQube | Suborbital: 2019-10-11 |
| 5 | (Hungary) SMOG-P | 1p | Budapest University of Technology and Economics, Hungary | Measurement of the radio spectrum in the UHF TV band | 2019-12-6, 08:18 | Electron | No longer in orbit | Alba Orbital | Decay: 2020-09-28 |
| 6 | (Hungary) ATL-1 | 2p | Advanced Technology of Laser | Test a new thermal isolation material in space | 2019-12-6, 08:18 | Electron | No longer in orbit | Alba Orbital | Decay: 2020-10-9 |
| 7 | (Spain) FossaSat-1 | 1p | Fossa Systems | LoRa Demonstration & Deployable solar panels. | 2019-12-6, 08:18 | Electron | No longer in orbit | Alba Orbital | Decay: 2020-10-28 |
| 8 | (United States) Noor 1a (Unicorn-2b) | 3p | Stara Space | Experimental | 2019-12-6, 08:18 | Electron | No longer in orbit | Alba Orbital | Decay: 2020-12-29 |
| 9 | (United States) Noor 1b (Unicorn-2c) | 3p | Stara Space | Experimental | 2019-12-6, 08:18 | Electron | No longer in orbit | Alba Orbital | Decay: 2020-04-7 |
| 10 | (Germany) TRSI | 1p | TRSI Club | Amateur, testing novel receiver | 2019-12-6, 08:18 | Electron | No longer in orbit | Alba Orbital | Decay: 2020-10-13 |
| 11 | (Argentina) DIY-1 / ARDUIQUBE | 1p | DIYSATELLITE | Technology Demonstrator | 2021-3-22, 06:07:12 | Soyuz-2.1a / Fregat | Deployed | GAUSS | |
| 12 | (Italy) STECCO | 6p | School of Aerospace Engineering of Sapienza University of Rome | Laser Ranging | 2021-3-22, 06:07:12 | Soyuz-2.1a / Fregat | Deployed | GAUSS | |
| 13 | (Hungary) SMOG-1 | 1p | Budapest University of Technology and Economics, Hungary | Measurement of the radio spectrum in the UHF TV band | 2021-3-22, 06:07:12 | Soyuz-2.1a / Fregat | Deployed | GAUSS | |
| | (Argentina) MDQube SAT-1 prototype | 1.25p | Innova Space | Technology demonstration | 2021-6-11 | Aventura I-e2 | Success | TLON Space | Suborbital: 2021-6-11 |
| 14 | (Spain) GENESIS N | 1.5p | AMSAT EA | Amateur Radio / Thruster Experiment | 2021-9-3, 01:59 | Alpha | Launch failure | FOSSA System / Libre Space Foundation | Suborbital: 2021-9-3 (Note: Intended to reach orbit. Launch vehicle failed while under first stage flight on a suborbital trajectory.) |
| 15 | (Spain) GENESIS L | 1.5p | AMSAT EA | Amateur Radio / Thruster Experiment | 2021-9-3, 01:59 | Alpha | Launch failure | FOSSA System / Libre Space Foundation | Suborbital: 2021-9-3 |
| 16 | (Greece) QUBIK 1 | 1p | Libre Space Foundation | Amateur Radio / Technology Demonstrator | 2021-9-3, 01:59 | Alpha | Launch failure | FOSSA System / Libre Space Foundation | Suborbital: 2021-9-3 |
| 17 | (Greece) QUBIK 2 | 1p | Libre Space Foundation | Amateur Radio / Technology Demonstrator | 2021-9-3, 01:59 | Alpha | Launch failure | FOSSA System / Libre Space Foundation | Suborbital: 2021-9-3 |
| 18 | (Spain) FOSSASAT 1b | 1p | Fossa Systems | LoRa Demonstration | 2021-9-3, 01:59 | Alpha | Launch failure | FOSSA System / Libre Space Foundation | Suborbital: 2021-9-3 |
| 19 | (Spain) FOSSASAT 2 | 2p | Fossa Systems | LoRa Demonstration | 2021-9-3, 01:59 | Alpha | Launch failure | FOSSA System / Libre Space Foundation | Suborbital: 2021-9-3 |
| 20 | (Germany) Unicorn 1 | 2p | Alba Orbital | Inter-sat link | 2022-1-13, 15:25 | Falcon 9 | No longer in orbit | Alba Orbital / Exolaunch | |
| 21 | (Germany) Unicorn 2A | 3p | Alba Orbital | Earth observation | 2022-1-13, 15:25 | Falcon 9 | No longer in orbit | Alba Orbital / Exolaunch | |
| 22 | (Germany) Unicorn 2D | 3p | Alba Orbital | Earth observation | 2022-1-13, 15:25 | Falcon 9 | No longer in orbit | Alba Orbital / Exolaunch | |
| 23 | (Germany) Unicorn 2E | 3p | Alba Orbital | Earth observation | 2022-1-13, 15:25 | Falcon 9 | No longer in orbit | Alba Orbital / Exolaunch | |
| 24 | (Germany) Unicorn 2TA1 | 1p | Carnegie Mellon University | Earth observation | 2022-1-13, 15:25 | Falcon 9 | No longer in orbit | Alba Orbital / Exolaunch | |
| 25 | (Netherlands) Delfi-PQ | 3p | Delft University of Technology | IoT | 2022-1-13, 15:25 | Falcon 9 | No longer in orbit | Alba Orbital / Exolaunch | |
| 26 | (Spain) Hades | 1.5p | AMSAT EA | Amateur radio | 2022-1-13, 15:25 | Falcon 9 | No longer in orbit | Alba Orbital / Exolaunch | |
| 27 | (Spain) EASAT-2 | 1.5p | AMSAT EA | Amateur radio / Science | 2022-1-13, 15:25 | Falcon 9 | No longer in orbit | Alba Orbital / Exolaunch | |
| 28 | (Israel) Sattla-2A | 2p | Ariel University | Education | 2022-1-13, 15:25 | Falcon 9 | No longer in orbit | Alba Orbital / Exolaunch | |
| 29 | (Israel) Sattla-2B | 2p | Ariel University | Education | 2022-1-13, 15:25 | Falcon 9 | No longer in orbit | Alba Orbital / Exolaunch | |
| 30 | (Brazil) PION-BR1 | 1p | PION Labs | Technology Demonstrator | 2022-1-13, 15:25 | Falcon 9 | No longer in orbit | Alba Orbital / Exolaunch | |
| 31 | (Argentina) MDQube-SAT1 | 2p | Innova Space | Technology Demonstrator | 2022-1-13, 15:25 | Falcon 9 | No longer in orbit | Alba Orbital / Exolaunch | |
| 32 | (Turkey) Grizu-263a | 1p | Zonguldak Bülent Ecevit University | Technology Demonstrator | 2022-1-13, 15:25 | Falcon 9 | No longer in orbit | Alba Orbital / Exolaunch | |
| 33 | (United States) Challenger | 3p | Quub / Intuidex | Technology Demonstrator | 2022-1-13, 15:25 | Falcon 9 | No longer in orbit | FOSSA Systems / Exolaunch | |
| 34 | (Nepal) SanoSat-1 | 1p | Orion Space | Technology Demonstrator | 2022-1-13, 15:25 | Falcon 9 | No longer in orbit | FOSSA Systems / Exolaunch | |
| 35 | (Switzerland) WISeSAT-1 (FOSSASAT-2E1) | 2p | WISeKey | IoT | 2022-1-13, 15:25 | Falcon 9 | No longer in orbit | FOSSA Systems / Exolaunch | |
| 36 | (Switzerland) WISeSAT-2 (FOSSASAT-2E2) | 2p | WISeKey | IoT | 2022-1-13, 15:25 | Falcon 9 | No longer in orbit | FOSSA Systems / Exolaunch | |
| 37 | (Italy) CShark Pilot 1 (FOSSASAT-2E3) | 2p | CShark | IoT | 2022-1-13, 15:25 | Falcon 9 | No longer in orbit | FOSSA Systems / Exolaunch | |
| 38 | (Sweden) Laika (FOSSASAT-2E4) | 2p | Porkchop | Technology Demonstrator | 2022-1-13, 15:25 | Falcon 9 | No longer in orbit | FOSSA Systems / Exolaunch | |
| 39 | (Spain) FOSSASAT-2E5 | 2p | FOSSA Systems | IoT | 2022-1-13, 15:25 | Falcon 9 | No longer in orbit | FOSSA Systems / Exolaunch | |
| 40 | (Spain) FOSSASAT-2E6 | 2p | FOSSA Systems | IoT | 2022-1-13, 15:25 | Falcon 9 | No longer in orbit | FOSSA Systems / Exolaunch | |
| 41 | (Germany) Unicorn-2F | 3p | Alba Orbital | Earth observation | 2022-5-2, 22:49 | Electron | Deployed | Alba Orbital | |
| 42 | (Germany) TRSI-2 | 1p | TRSI Club | Amateur radio | 2022-5-2, 22:49 | Electron | Deployed | Alba Orbital | |
| 43 | (Germany) TRSI-3 | 1p | TRSI Club | Amateur radio | 2022-5-2, 22:49 | Electron | Deployed | Alba Orbital | |
| 44 | (United States) MyRadar-1 | 1p | ACME AtronOmatic | Experimental | 2022-5-2, 22:49 | Electron | Deployed | Alba Orbital | |
| 45 | (Spain) FOSSASAT-2E7 | 2p | FOSSA Systems | IoT / Earth Exploration | 2022-5-25, 18:35 | Falcon 9 | Deployed | FOSSA Systems / Momentus | |
| 46 | (Spain) FOSSASAT-2E8 | 2p | FOSSA Systems | IoT / Earth Exploration | 2022-5-25, 18:35 | Falcon 9 | Deployed | FOSSA Systems / Momentus | |
| 47 | (Spain) FOSSASAT-2E9 | 2p | FOSSA Systems | IoT / Earth Exploration | 2022-5-25, 18:35 | Falcon 9 | Deployment failure | FOSSA Systems / Momentus | |
| 48 | (Spain) FOSSASAT-2E10 | 2p | FOSSA Systems | IoT / Earth Exploration | 2022-5-25, 18:35 | Falcon 9 | Deployment failure | FOSSA Systems / Momentus | |
| 49 | (Spain) FOSSASAT-2E11 | 2p | FOSSA Systems | IoT / Earth Exploration | 2022-5-25, 18:35 | Falcon 9 | Deployed | FOSSA Systems / Momentus | |
| 50 | (Spain) FOSSASAT-2E12 | 2p | FOSSA Systems | IoT / Earth Exploration | 2022-5-25, 18:35 | Falcon 9 | Deployed | FOSSA Systems / Momentus | |
| 51 | (Spain) FOSSASAT-2E13 | 2p | FOSSA Systems | IoT / Earth Exploration | 2022-5-25, 18:35 | Falcon 9 | Deployed | FOSSA Systems / Momentus | |
| 52 | (United States) Canary Hatchling | 1p | CareWeather | Demonstrator | 2022-5-25, 18:35 | Falcon 9 | Deployed | FOSSA Systems / Momentus | |
| 53 | (Spain) FOSSASAT-1B | 1p | FOSSA Systems | IoT | 2022-10-1, 07:01 | Alpha | No longer in orbit | Libre Space Foundation | Decay: 2022-10-3 |
| 54 | (Spain) GENESIS-G/ASTROLAND-1 | 1.5p | AMSAT EA | Amateur Radio | 2022-10-1, 07:01 | Alpha | No longer in orbit | Libre Space Foundation | Decay: 2022-10-3 |
| 55 | (Spain) GENESIS-J/ASTROLAND-2 | 1.5p | AMSAT EA | Amateur Radio | 2022-10-1, 07:01 | Alpha | No longer in orbit | Libre Space Foundation | Decay: 2022-10-3 |
| 56 | (Greece) QUBIK-3 | 1p | Libre Space Foundation | Amateur Radio / Technology Demonstrator | 2022-10-1, 07:01 | Alpha | No longer in orbit | Libre Space Foundation | Decay: 2022-10-3 |
| 57 | (Greece) QUBIK-4 | 1p | Libre Space Foundation | Amateur Radio / Technology Demonstrator | 2022-10-1, 07:01 | Alpha | No longer in orbit | Libre Space Foundation | Decay: 2022-10-3 |
| 58 | (Germany) Unicorn-2G | 3p | Alba Orbital | Earth observation | 2023-1-3 14:56 | Falcon 9 | Transfer stage failure | Launcher | |
| 59 | (Germany) Unicorn-2H | 3p | Alba Orbital | Earth observation | 2023-1-3 14:56 | Falcon 9 | Transfer stage failure | Launcher | |
| 60 | (Spain) URESAT | 1.5p | AMSAT EA / URE | Amateur radio | 12 June 2023 21:35 | Falcon 9 | In orbit | Alba Orbital | |
| 61 | (Hungary) MRC-100 (formerly SMOG-2) | 3p | Budapest University of Technology and Economics | Radio spectrum measurement, technology demonstration | 12 June 2023 21:35 | Falcon 9 | In orbit | Alba Orbital | |
| 62 | (Romania) ROM-2 | 1p | International Computer High School of Bucharest | Earth observation | 12 June 2023 21:35 | Falcon 9 | In orbit | Alba Orbital | |
| 63 | (Germany) Unicorn-2I | 3p | Alba Orbital | Earth observation | 12 June 2023 21:35 | Falcon 9 | In orbit | Alba Orbital | |
| 64 | (Israel) Satlla-2I | 2p | Ariel University | Education | 12 June 2023 21:35 | Falcon 9 | In orbit | Alba Orbital | |
| 65 | (Turkey) Istanbul | 1p | Hello Space | IoT | 12 June 2023 21:35 | Falcon 9 | In orbit | Alba Orbital | |
| 66 | (Russia) TinySat* | 1p | Stratonavtika | Earth Observation | 27 June 2023 11:34:49 | Soyuz-2.1b / Fregat | In orbit | Stratonavtika | |
| 67 | (Russia) TinySat* | 1p | Stratonavtika | Earth Observation | 27 June 2023 11:34:49 | Soyuz-2.1b / Fregat | In orbit | Stratonavtika | |
| 68 | (Russia) TinySat* | 1p | Stratonavtika | Earth Observation | 27 June 2023 11:34:49 | Soyuz-2.1b / Fregat | In orbit | Stratonavtika | |
| 69 | (Russia) TinySat* | 1p | Stratonavtika | Earth Observation | 27 June 2023 11:34:49 | Soyuz-2.1b / Fregat | In orbit | Stratonavtika | |
| 70 | (Russia) TinySat* | 2p | Stratonavtika | Earth Observation | 27 June 2023 11:34:49 | Soyuz-2.1b / Fregat | In orbit | Stratonavtika | |
| 71 | (Russia) TinySat* | 2p | Stratonavtika | Earth Observation | 27 June 2023 11:34:49 | Soyuz-2.1b / Fregat | In orbit | Stratonavtika | |
| 72 | (Spain) HADES-D | 1.5p | AMSAT EA / Hydra Space | Amateur radio / Platform testing | 11 November 2023 | Falcon 9 | In orbit | Alba Orbital | |
| 73 | (Romania) ROM-3 | 1.5p | FRR | EO | 11 November 2023 | Falcon 9 | In orbit | Alba Orbital | |
| 74 | (Malaysia) SpaceANT-D | 1p | SpaceIn | IOT | 11 November 2023 | Falcon 9 | In orbit | Alba Orbital | |
| 75 | (Germany) U2 Tartan Artibeus-2 | 1p | Alba Orbital/CMU | Tech Demo | 11 November 2023 | Falcon 9 | In orbit | Alba Orbital | |
| 76 | (Germany) Unicorn-2J | 3p | Alba Orbital | EO | 11 November 2023 | Falcon 9 | In orbit | Alba Orbital | |
| 77 | (Germany) Unicorn-2K | 3p | Alba Orbital | EO | 11 November 2023 | Falcon 9 | In orbit | Alba Orbital | |
| 78 | (Turkey) Hello Test 1 | 2p | Hello Space | IOT | 11 November 2023 | Falcon 9 | In orbit | Momentus | |
| 79 | (Turkey) Hello Test 2 | 2p | Hello Space | IOT | 11 November 2023 | Falcon 9 | In orbit | Momentus | |
| 80 | (Argentina) MDQubesat-2 | 2p | Innova Space | IOT | 1 December 2023 | Falcon 9 | In orbit | Alba Orbital | |
| 81 | (Germany) Unicorn-2L | 3p | Alba Orbital | EO | 1 December 2023 | Falcon 9 | In orbit | Alba Orbital | |
| 82 | (Germany) Unicorn-2M | 3p | Alba Orbital | EO | 1 December 2023 | Falcon 9 | In orbit | Alba Orbital | |
| 83 | (Germany) Unicorn-2N | 3p | Alba Orbital | EO | 1 December 2023 | Falcon 9 | In orbit | Alba Orbital | |
| 84 | (Spain) GENESIS-A | 1.5p | AMSAT EA / Hydra Space | Amateur radio | 9 July 2024 | Ariane 6 | In orbit | ESA | |
| 85 | (Turkey) Skylink-1 | 3p | Hello Space | IOT | 14 January 2025 | Falcon 9 | In orbit | Alba Orbital | |
| 86 | (Turkey) Skylink-2 | 3p | Hello Space | IOT | 14 January 2025 | Falcon 9 | In orbit | Alba Orbital | |
| 87 | (Poland) HYPE | 1p | AGH University | Selfie | 14 January 2025 | Falcon 9 | In orbit | Alba Orbital | |
| 88 | (Portugal) PROMETHEUS-1 | 1p | Minho University | Education | 14 January 2025 | Falcon 9 | In orbit | Alba Orbital | |
| 89 | (Luxembourg) Poquito | 1p | University of Luxembourg | Tech Demo | 14 January 2025 | Falcon 9 | In orbit | Alba Orbital | |
| 90 | (Spain) Hades-R | 1.5p | Hydra Space | Tech Demo | 14 January 2025 | Falcon 9 | In orbit | Alba Orbital | |
| 91 | (Spain) Hades-T | 1.5p | Hydra Space | IOT | 14 January 2025 | Falcon 9 | In orbit | Alba Orbital | |
| 92 | (Germany) Unicorn-2O | 3p | Alba Orbital | Earth Observation | 15th of March 2025 | Falcon 9 | In orbit | Alba Orbital | |
| 93 | (Germany) Unicorn-2P | 3p | Alba Orbital | Earth Observation | 15th of March 2025 | Falcon 9 | In orbit | Alba Orbital | |
| 94 | (Germany) Unicorn-2Q | 3p | Alba Orbital | Earth Observation | 15th of March 2025 | Falcon 9 | In orbit | Alba Orbital | |
| 95 | (Spain) Hades-ICM | 1.5p | HYDRA SPACE / IC MERCURY / SMART IR | Voice transponder, tech demo | 15th of March 2025 | Falcon 9 | In orbit | Alba Orbital | |
| 96 | (Spain) Hydra-W | 1.5p | Hydra Space | IOT / Tech Demo | 15th of March 2025 | Falcon 9 | In orbit | Alba Orbital | |
| 97 | (Brazil) ANISCSAT | 1p | Azercosmos | Education | 28th of November 2025 | Falcon 9 | In orbit | Alba Orbital | |
| 98 | (Brazil) SARI-01 | 1p | Ideia Space / Saudi Space Agency | Education | 28th of November 2025 | Falcon 9 | In orbit | Alba Orbital | |
| 99 | (Brazil) SARI-02 | 1p | Ideia Space / Saudi Space Agency | Education | 28th of November 2025 | Falcon 9 | In orbit | Alba Orbital | |
| 100 | (Hungary) Hunity | 3p | BME | Technology Demonstrator | 28th of November 2025 | Falcon 9 | In orbit | Alba Orbital | |
| 101 | (Brazil) GalaxySat-1 | 1p | Galaxy Explorer / Kevin Tang | Technology Demonstrator / Science | 12th of January 2026, 10:18:30 UTC | PSLV-C62 | Third stage failure | AlltoSpace | |
| 102 | (Brazil) Orbital Temple | 1p | Ideia Space / Edson Pavoni | Art | 12th of January 2026, 10:18:30 UTC | PSLV-C62 | Third stage failure | AlltoSpace | |
| 103 | (Brazil) UaiSat-1 | 1p | LISE / UFSJ | IoT | 12th of January 2026, 10:18:30 UTC | PSLV-C62 | Third stage failure | AlltoSpace | |
| 104 | (Brazil) EduSat | 1p | Ideia Space | Educational Satellite | 12th of January 2026, 10:18:30 UTC | PSLV-C62 | Third stage failure | AlltoSpace | |
| 105 | SpinnyONE | 2P | HYDRA SPACE / Spinning Around | Technology Demonstrator | 30th of March 2026 | Falcon 9 | In orbit | Alba Orbital | |
| 106 | (Vietnam) Vegafly-1 | 1p | Vegastar/Vietnam Amateur Radio Club (VARC) | EO/Education | 30th of March 2026 | Falcon 9 | In orbit | Alba Orbital | |
| 107 | (Malaysia) Decimals-Sat1 | 1p | Ocullo Space | DNA | 30th of March 2026 | Falcon 9 | In orbit | Alba Orbital | |
| 108 | (Germany) Unicorn-2R | 3p | Alba Orbital | Earth Observation | 30th of March 2026 | Falcon 9 | In orbit | Alba Orbital | |
| 109 | (Germany) Unicorn-2S | 3p | Alba Orbital | Earth Observation | 30th of March 2026 | Falcon 9 | In orbit | Alba Orbital | |

- * Tinysat do not follow the currently recognized PocketQube Mechanical standard as they deploy from a cubesat with a rail interface and not from a dedicated MR-Fod style PocketQube deployer on a tabbed baseplate (which all other orbital pocketqubes on the list have used). This makes them a variant of the PocketQube standard.

== In development ==
| Name | Type | Organisation | Mission | Launch Date (UTC) | Rocket | Broker | Status | Remarks |
|---|---|---|---|---|---|---|---|---|
| (South Africa) Sustaino-1 | 1p | EAK-Orbitals | Infrastructure Loss & Earth Observation | TBC | Falcon 9 | Alba Orbital | In development | The satellite will take images of Infrastructure During and after wars,floods etc to show the loss of infrastructure to local,provincial and national government. |
| Delfi-Twins | 3p x2 | Tu Delft | Technology Demonstrator & Education | TBC | TBC | Alba Orbital | In development | Formation Flying & Drag Adjustable Wings |
| TigerCub | 1p | Princeton | Education | TBC | TBC | Alba Orbital | In development | |
| (Germany) AQUIS | 2p | Space Team Aachen | Technology Demonstrator | TBC | TBC | TBC | In development | The satellite will contain an in-house developed propulsion system |
| OzQube-1 | 1p | Picosat Systems | Earth Observation | TBC | TBC | TBC | In development | Team Interview |
| Discovery 1a | 1p | Quub, Inc. | Camera / Photo Sat | TBC | TBC | TBC | In development | Windform XT 2.0 based PocketQube testing of the shelf components for space use |
| UoMBSat1 | 1p | University of Malta + University of Birmingham | Technology Demonstrator + Ionospheric Sounder | TBC | TBC | TBC | In development | ASTREA Website @ UoM SERENE Website @ UoB |
| APRS PocketQube | 1p | National Chiao-Tung University | APRS PocketQube for Moving Objects Tracking | TBC | TBC | TBC | In development | |
| UBO | 1p | Satellite Applications Catapult | Outreach | TBC | TBC | TBC | In development | http://buildubo.co.uk/build/ |
| Myansat-1 | 1p | Independent | Outreach | TBC | TBC | TBC | In development | https://web.archive.org/web/20190115020853/http://myansat.com/ |
| TFTQube | 1p | The Flame Trench | Amateur | TBC | TBC | TBC | In development | https://theflametrench.com/flagship/ |
| TBC | TBC | University of Zacatecas | STEM | TBC | TBC | TBC | In development | https://www.research"ate.net/project/Design-and-Implementation-of-a-PocketQube-system-for-educative-purposes |
| LibertyQube-1 | 1p | Liberty Life LLc | Experimental | TBC | TBC | TBC | In development | https://www.libertylife-llc.com/ |
| SatDuino | 1p | Technical School N° 5 of Mar Del Plata | Education | TBC | TBC | TBC | In development | https://satduinot5t1.wixsite.com/satduino |
| BYqube-1 | 1p | Brigham Young University | Education | TBC | TBC | TBC | In development | |
| Pycubed-1 | 1p | Stanford University | Education | TBD | | Alba Orbital | In development | |
| DynOSSAT-EDU | 1p | BHDynamics | | TBC | TBC | TBC | In development | |
| BS-0 | 1p | Aerozono Space Technologies (Argentina) | Earth Observation/ Technology Demonstrator | TBC | TBC | TBC | In development | https://aerozono_space.gitlab.io/aerozono-space |
| BeliefSat-1 | 2p | K. J. Somaiya Institute of Engineering and Information Technology | Educational mission demonstrating PocketQube technologies | TBC | TBC | TBC | In development | https://github.com/NewLeapKjsieit/BeliefSat |
| TQube-FO | 1p | TQube | Amateur tracking | TBD | TBD | TBD | In development | |
| Leopard-Sat 1 | 1p | Wentworth Institute of Technology | Experimental mission demonstrating the use of two cameras onboard | TBD | TBD | TBD | In development | https://www.notion.so/picosat/Wentworth-PicoSat-a2947a5c33a04c8d9a6e7d9849fd3605 |
| GOAT-1 | 1p | Worcester Polytechnic Institute | Education | TBD | TBD | TBD | In development | |
| (Kurdistan Region) RojavaSat | 1p | Kurdistan Space Research Agency (KSRA) | Educational Pioneering Satellite Initiative & Localized Weather and Climate Data | TBC | TBC | KSRA | In development | |

== PocketQube vs PocketQub ==
The PocketQube standard originally started as PocketQub. This was changed in 2012 by Professor Bob Twiggs of Morehead State University. The standard is now referred to as PocketQube.

== Launch ==
As of December 2019, the only launch brokers capable of providing launch integration for PocketQube satellites are Fossa Systems, Libre Space Foundation, Alba Orbital and GAUSS Srl.

== See also ==
- CubeSat
