= Alba Orbital =

Satellite manufacturing company

- Type: Limited company
- Industry: Satellite Manufacture
- Founded: 5 October 2012
- Headquarters: Glasgow, United Kingdom
- Key people: Tom Walkinshaw
- Products: Pocketqube Platforms and Components
- Website: www.albaorbital.com

Alba Orbital is a Scottish aerospace company based in Glasgow that develops PocketQube class satellites and satellite deployers and provides launch services for small satellites.

== History ==
The company was founded by Tom Walkinshaw in 2012. The company is headquartered in Glasgow, Scotland. In 2021, Alba Orbital participated in the startup accelerator program Y Combinator, located in Silicon Valley, United States. They raised US$3.4 million after completing the program.

== Earth Observation ==
In 2025, Alba Orbital began releasing Earth observation imagery collected by its Unicorn-2 satellite constellation.

== Products ==
The company has developed two satellite platforms. The Unicorn-1 platform is a 1P PocketQube satellite. The Unicorn-2 platform, is a 3P Earth observation satellite. The company has also developed two spacecraft deployers. The Albapod 6P can carry up to 6 PocketQube satellites. The 96P deployer can carry up to 96 individual satellites supporting a Satellite constellation mission into orbit.

== Partnerships and Programmes ==
The company holds contracts with the European Space Agency for ARTES.

In 2026, Alba Orbital was selected for the NATO DIANA Challenge Programme and is listed by NATO DIANA as a member of its 2026 cohort under Resilient Space Operations.

== Launch Services ==
Alba Orbital arranges rideshare launch opportunities for PocketQube spacecraft, using deployers supplied by the company.

The following table lists launch missions in which Alba Orbital acted as launch broker or supplied an AlbaPod deployer.

Alba Orbital launch missions	Date	Launch Vehicle	Payloads	Orginization	Deployment Outcome
Alba Cluster 2	6 December 2019	Electron	(Hungary) ATL-1	BME	Success
Alba Cluster 2	6 December 2019	Electron	(Spain) FossaSat-1	FOSSA Systems	Success
Alba Cluster 2	6 December 2019	Electron	(United States) NOOR 1A	Stara Space	Success
Alba Cluster 2	6 December 2019	Electron	(United States) NOOR 1B	Stara Space	Success
Alba Cluster 2	6 December 2019	Electron	(Hungary) SMOG-P	BME	Success
Alba Cluster 2	6 December 2019	Electron	(United States) TRSI-1	ACME AtronOmatic	Success
Alba Cluster 3	13 January 2022	Falcon 9 Block 5	(Netherlands) Delfi-PQ	TU Delft	Success
Alba Cluster 3	13 January 2022	Falcon 9 Block 5	(Spain) EASAT-2	AMSAT EA	Success
Alba Cluster 3	13 January 2022	Falcon 9 Block 5	(Turkey) Grizu-263a	ZBEU	Success
Alba Cluster 3	13 January 2022	Falcon 9 Block 5	(Spain) HADES	AMSAT EA	Success
Alba Cluster 3	13 January 2022	Falcon 9 Block 5	(Argentina) MDQube-SAT 1	Innova Space	Success
Alba Cluster 4	13 January 2022	Falcon 9 Block 5	(Brazil) PION-BR1	PION Labs	Success
Alba Cluster 4	13 January 2022	Falcon 9 Block 5	(Israel) SATLLA 2B	Ariel University	Success
Alba Cluster 4	13 January 2022	Falcon 9 Block 5	(Israel) SATLLA 2A	Ariel University	Success
Alba Cluster 4	13 January 2022	Falcon 9 Block 5	(United States) Tartan Artibeus-1	CMU	Success
Alba Cluster 4	13 January 2022	Falcon 9 Block 5	(Germany) Unicorn-1	Alba Orbital	Success
Alba Cluster 4	13 January 2022	Falcon 9 Block 5	(Germany) Unicorn-2A	Alba Orbital	Success
Alba Cluster 4	13 January 2022	Falcon 9 Block 5	(Germany) Unicorn-2D	Alba Orbital	Success
Alba Cluster 4	13 January 2022	Falcon 9 Block 5	(Germany) Unicorn-2E	Alba Orbital	Success
Alba Cluster X	2 May 2022	Electron	(United States) MyRadar-1	ACME AtronOmatic	Success
Alba Cluster X	2 May 2022	Electron	(United States) TRSI 2	ACME AtronOmatic	Success
Alba Cluster X	2 May 2022	Electron	(United States) TRSI 3	ACME AtronOmatic	Success
Alba Cluster X	2 May 2022	Electron	(Germany) Unicorn-2F	Alba Orbital	Success
Alba Cluster (Launcher-1 / Orbiter SN1)	3 January 2023	Falcon 9 Block 5 / Orbiter	(Germany) Unicorn-2G	Alba Orbital	Failure
Alba Cluster (Launcher-1 / Orbiter SN1)	3 January 2023	Falcon 9 Block 5 / Orbiter	(Germany) Unicorn-2H	Alba Orbital	Failure
Alba Cluster 6	12 June 2023	Falcon 9 Block 5 / ION SCV	(Turkey) Istanbul	Hello Space	Success
Alba Cluster 6	12 June 2023	Falcon 9 Block 5 / ION SCV	(Hungary) MRC-100	BME	Success
Alba Cluster 6	12 June 2023	Falcon 9 Block 5 / ION SCV	(Romania) ROM-2	ICHSB	Success
Alba Cluster 6	12 June 2023	Falcon 9 Block 5 / ION SCV	(Israel) Satlla-2I	Ariel University	Success
Alba Cluster 6	12 June 2023	Falcon 9 Block 5 / ION SCV	(Germany) Unicorn-2I	Alba Orbital	Success
Alba Cluster 6	12 June 2023	Falcon 9 Block 5 / ION SCV	(Spain) URESAT-1	AMSAT-EA	Success
Alba Cluster 7	11 November 2023	Falcon 9 Block 5 / ION SCV	(Spain) Hydra-1 aka HADES-D	Hydra Space / AMSAT EA	Success
Alba Cluster 7	11 November 2023	Falcon 9 Block 5 / ION SCV	(Romania) ROM-3	FRR	Success
Alba Cluster 7	11 November 2023	Falcon 9 Block 5 / ION SCV	(Malaysia) SpaceANT-D	SpaceIn	Success
Alba Cluster 7	11 November 2023	Falcon 9 Block 5 / ION SCV	(United States) Tartan Artibeus-2	CMU	Success
Alba Cluster 7	11 November 2023	Falcon 9 Block 5 / ION SCV	(Germany) Unicorn-2J	Alba Orbital	Success
Alba Cluster 7	11 November 2023	Falcon 9 Block 5 / ION SCV	(Germany) Unicorn-2K	Alba Orbital	Success
Alba Cluster 8	1 December 2023	Falcon 9 Block 5 / ION SCV	(Argentina) MDQubesat-1	Innova Space	Success
Alba Cluster 8	1 December 2023	Falcon 9 Block 5 / ION SCV	(Germany) Unicorn-2L	Alba Orbital	Success
Alba Cluster 8	1 December 2023	Falcon 9 Block 5 / ION SCV	(Germany) Unicorn-2M	Alba Orbital	Success
Alba Cluster 8	1 December 2023	Falcon 9 Block 5 / ION SCV	(Germany) Unicorn-2N	Alba Orbital	Success
Alba Cluster 9	14 January 2025	Falcon 9 Block 5 / ION SCV	(Turkey) Skylink-1	Hello Space	Success
Alba Cluster 9	14 January 2025	Falcon 9 Block 5 / ION SCV	(Turkey) Skylink-2	Hello Space	Success
Alba Cluster 9	14 January 2025	Falcon 9 Block 5 / ION SCV	(Poland) HYPE	AGH University	Success
Alba Cluster 9	14 January 2025	Falcon 9 Block 5 / ION SCV	(Portugal) PROMETHEUS-1	Minho University	Success
Alba Cluster 9	14 January 2025	Falcon 9 Block 5 / ION SCV	(Luxembourg) Poquito	University of Luxembourg	Success
Alba Cluster 9	14 January 2025	Falcon 9 Block 5 / ION SCV	(Spain) Hades-R	Hydra Space	Success
Alba Cluster 9	14 January 2025	Falcon 9 Block 5 / ION SCV	(Spain) Hades-T	Hydra Space	Success
Alba Cluster 10	15 March 2025	Falcon 9 Block 5 / ION SCV	(Germany) Unicorn-2O	Alba Orbital	Success
Alba Cluster 10	15 March 2025	Falcon 9 Block 5 / ION SCV	(Germany) Unicorn-2P	Alba Orbital	Success
Alba Cluster 10	15 March 2025	Falcon 9 Block 5 / ION SCV	(Germany) Unicorn-2Q	Alba Orbital	Success
Alba Cluster 10	15 March 2025	Falcon 9 Block 5 / ION SCV	(Spain) Hades-ICM	HYDRA SPACE / IC MERCURY / SMART IR	Success
Alba Cluster 10	15 March 2025	Falcon 9 Block 5 / ION SCV	(Spain) Hades-W	Hydra Space	Success
Alba Cluster 11	28 November 2025	Falcon 9 Block 5 / ION SCV	(Hungary) Hunity	BME	Success
Alba Cluster 11	28 November 2025	Falcon 9 Block 5 / ION SCV	(Brazil) SARI-01	Ideia Space / Saudi Space Agency	Success
Alba Cluster 11	28 November 2025	Falcon 9 Block 5 / ION SCV	(Brazil) SARI-02	Ideia Space / Saudi Space Agency	Success
Alba Cluster 11	28 November 2025	Falcon 9 Block 5 / ION SCV	(Brazil) ANISCSAT	Azercosmos	Success
Alba Cluster 12	30 March 2026	Falcon 9 Block 5	(Spain) SpinnyONE	HYDRA SPACE / Spinning Around	Success
Alba Cluster 12	30 March 2026	Falcon 9 Block 5	(Vietnam) Vegafly-1	Vegastar/Vietnam Amateur Radio Club (VARC)	Success
Alba Cluster 12	30 March 2026	Falcon 9 Block 5	(Malaysia) Decimals-Sat1	Ocullo Space	Success
Alba Cluster 12	30 March 2026	Falcon 9 Block 5	(Germany) Unicorn-2R	Alba Orbital	Success
Alba Cluster 12	30 March 2026	Falcon 9 Block 5	(Germany) Unicorn-2S	Alba Orbital	Success

== See also ==
- PocketQube – The satellite format Alba Orbital specializes in building
