= ION Satellite Carrier =

Space tug by D-Orbit

- Manufacturer: D-Orbit
- Country of origin: Italy
- Website: https://www.dorbit.space/launch-deployment

Specifications
- Spacecraft type: Satellite dispenser
- Design life: > 3 years

Capacity

Payload to LEO
- Mass: 160 kg

Production
- Status: Active
- Planned: 1
- Launched: 16
- Operational: 16
- Maiden launch: 3 September 2020
- Last launch: 15 January 2025

Related spacecraft
- Flown with: Falcon 9 Block 5 Vega

ION Satellite Carrier (formerly ION CubeSat Carrier) is a satellite platform developed, manufactured, and operated by Italian company D-Orbit. The platform features a customizable 64U satellite dispenser capable of hosting a combination of CubeSats that fits the volume. Throughout a mission, ION Satellite Carrier can release the hosted satellites individually, changing orbital parameter between one deployment and the next. Each of the miniature CubeSats weighs a few kilograms.

The organization also developed a D3 (D-Orbit Decommissioning Device) system, which has obtained funding from the European Commission and the European Space Agency, to safely dispose of satellites at the end of their lives and avoid adding to the problems created by the approximately 130 million pieces of space debris. According to D-Orbit, a space circular economy is feasible, and space recycling will soon be a new sector. This will involve using local resources such as dead satellites to create spaceships in space.

The inaugural mission, named Origin, was launched on Vega flight VV16 from the Guiana Space Centre in French Guiana on September 3, 2020. The vehicle, named ION SCV Lucas, carried 12 SuperDove satellites from Planet Labs. On September 25, ION SCV Lucas released successfully the first SuperDove satellite of the batch; the last satellite was deployed on October 28. As of December 2023, ION SCV has successfully completed 13 missions, 1 as a payload of a Vega rocket and 12 as a payload of a Falcon 9 Block 5 rocket.

D-Orbit is a successful alumnus of the European Space Agency's incubator, ESA BIC Portugal, and the two firms collaborated on Project Sunrise, an active debris removal project, in 2019.

== Mission overview ==
The carrier deployed CubeSats one by one using a spring release mechanism once positioned in a Sun-synchronous orbit at 500 km. The 60 cm cubic dispenser allows for several combinations of 1U, 2U, 3U, 3U+, 6U, 6U+, 12U and 12U+ Cubesats along the vertical axis. After completion of the up to one month long deployment phase, ION CubeSat Carrier will initiate a validation phase of its payloads directly integrated on the platform.

== Missions ==
=== Past missions ===
Mission Name	Spacecraft	Date	Launch Vehicle	Payload	Customers	Outcome
Origin	ION SCV-001 Lucas	3 September 2020	Vega	(United States) Flock-4v × 12	Planet Labs	Success
Pulse	ION SCV-002 Laurentius	24 January 2021	Falcon 9 Block 5	(United States) Flock-4s × 8	Planet Labs	Success
Pulse	ION SCV-002 Laurentius	24 January 2021	Falcon 9 Block 5	(United States) SpaceBEE × 12	Swarm Technologies	Success
Pulse	ION SCV-002 Laurentius	24 January 2021	Falcon 9 Block 5	(Italy) ARGO (hosted)	EICAS Automazione	Success
Pulse	ION SCV-002 Laurentius	24 January 2021	Falcon 9 Block 5	(Spain) DRAGO (hosted)	IAC	Success
Wild Ride	ION SCV-003 Dauntless David	30 June 2021	Falcon 9 Block 5	(United Arab Emirates) Ghalib	Marshall Intech	Success
Wild Ride	ION SCV-003 Dauntless David	30 June 2021	Falcon 9 Block 5	(Thailand) NAPA-2	RTAF	Success
Wild Ride	ION SCV-003 Dauntless David	30 June 2021	Falcon 9 Block 5	(Spain) NEPTUNO	Elecnor Deimos	Success
Wild Ride	ION SCV-003 Dauntless David	30 June 2021	Falcon 9 Block 5	(Kuwait) QMR-KWT	Orbital Space	Success
Wild Ride	ION SCV-003 Dauntless David	30 June 2021	Falcon 9 Block 5	(Bulgaria) SPARTAN	EnduroSat	Success
Wild Ride	ION SCV-003 Dauntless David	30 June 2021	Falcon 9 Block 5	(Finland) W-Cube	Reaktor Space	Success
Wild Ride	ION SCV-003 Dauntless David	30 June 2021	Falcon 9 Block 5	(Italy) LaserCube (hosted)	Italian Stellar Project	Success
Wild Ride	ION SCV-003 Dauntless David	30 June 2021	Falcon 9 Block 5	(United Kingdom) Nebula (hosted)	D-Orbit UK	Success
Wild Ride	ION SCV-003 Dauntless David	30 June 2021	Falcon 9 Block 5	(United States) Worldfloods (hosted)	Frontier Development Lab	Success
Dashing Through the Stars	ION SCV-004 Elysian Eleonora	13 January 2022	Falcon 9 Block 5	(United States) DODONA	USC	Success
Dashing Through the Stars	ION SCV-004 Elysian Eleonora	13 January 2022	Falcon 9 Block 5	(Poland) LabSat	SatRevolution	Success
Dashing Through the Stars	ION SCV-004 Elysian Eleonora	13 January 2022	Falcon 9 Block 5	(Poland) STORK 1, 2	SatRevolution	Success
Dashing Through the Stars	ION SCV-004 Elysian Eleonora	13 January 2022	Falcon 9 Block 5	(Poland) SW1FT	SatRevolution	Success
Dashing Through the Stars	ION SCV-004 Elysian Eleonora	13 January 2022	Falcon 9 Block 5	(Czech Republic) VZLUSat-2	VZLU	Success
Dashing Through the Stars	ION SCV-004 Elysian Eleonora	13 January 2022	Falcon 9 Block 5	(Italy) (Sweden) (Finland) cloud platform (hosted)	D-Orbit / Unibap / VTT	Success
Spacelust	ION SCV-005 Almighty Alexius	1 April 2022	Falcon 9 Block 5	(Luxembourg) KSF2 × 4	Kleos Space	Success
Spacelust	ION SCV-005 Almighty Alexius	1 April 2022	Falcon 9 Block 5	(Chile) PlantSat	University of Chile	Success
Spacelust	ION SCV-005 Almighty Alexius	1 April 2022	Falcon 9 Block 5	(Chile) SUCHAI 2, 3	University of Chile	Success
Spacelust	ION SCV-005 Almighty Alexius	1 April 2022	Falcon 9 Block 5	(Italy) UP-box (hosted)	Upmosphere	Success
Infinite Blue	ION SCV-006 Thrilling Thomas	25 May 2022	Falcon 9 Block 5	(Spain) Guardian 1	Aistech Space	Success
Infinite Blue	ION SCV-006 Thrilling Thomas	25 May 2022	Falcon 9 Block 5	(United States) (Italy) SBUDNIC	BUSE / CNR	Success
Infinite Blue	ION SCV-006 Thrilling Thomas	25 May 2022	Falcon 9 Block 5	(United States) Crypto-1 (hosted)	Cryptosat	Success
Infinite Blue	ION SCV-006 Thrilling Thomas	25 May 2022	Falcon 9 Block 5	(Italy) GEN-01 (hosted)	Genergo	Success
Second Star to the Right	ION SCV-007 Glorious Gratia	3 January 2023	Falcon 9 Block 5	(Switzerland) Astrocast × 4	Astrocast SA	Success
Second Star to the Right	ION SCV-007 Glorious Gratia	3 January 2023	Falcon 9 Block 5	(Italy) FUTURA-SM1	NPC Spacemind	Success
Second Star to the Right	ION SCV-007 Glorious Gratia	3 January 2023	Falcon 9 Block 5	(Italy) FUTURA-SM3	NPC Spacemind	Success
Second Star to the Right	ION SCV-007 Glorious Gratia	3 January 2023	Falcon 9 Block 5	(Sweden) (United States) Kelpie 1	ACC Clyde Space / Orbcomm	Success
Second Star to the Right	ION SCV-007 Glorious Gratia	3 January 2023	Falcon 9 Block 5	(United Arab Emirates) (Turkey) Sharja-Sat-1	SAASST / ITU	Success
Second Star to the Right	ION SCV-008 Fierce Franciscus	3 January 2023	Falcon 9 Block 5	(Israel) TAUSAT2	Tel Aviv University	Success
Second Star to the Right	ION SCV-008 Fierce Franciscus	3 January 2023	Falcon 9 Block 5	(United States) Cryptosat-2 (hosted)	Cryptosat	Success
Second Star to the Right	ION SCV-008 Fierce Franciscus	3 January 2023	Falcon 9 Block 5	(Spain) DRAGO-2 (hosted)	IAC	Success
Second Star to the Right	ION SCV-008 Fierce Franciscus	3 January 2023	Falcon 9 Block 5	(Italy) Genergo-2 (hosted)	Genergo	Success
Second Star to the Right	ION SCV-008 Fierce Franciscus	3 January 2023	Falcon 9 Block 5	? (hosted)	(undisclosed)	Success
Starfield	ION SCV-009 Eclectic Elena	31 January 2023	Falcon 9 Block 5	(United States) Satellite simulator	EBAD	Success
Starfield	ION SCV-009 Eclectic Elena	31 January 2023	Falcon 9 Block 5	(Germany) ADEO-N3 (hosted)	HPF	Success
Starfield	ION SCV-009 Eclectic Elena	31 January 2023	Falcon 9 Block 5	(Switzerland) Bunny (hosted)	EPFL	Success
Starfield	ION SCV-009 Eclectic Elena	31 January 2023	Falcon 9 Block 5	(New Zealand) SD-1 (hosted)	StardustMe	Success
Guardian	ION SCV-010 Masterful Matthaeus	15 April 2023	Falcon 9 Block 5	(European Union) ELO-3	Eutelsat	Success
Guardian	ION SCV-010 Masterful Matthaeus	15 April 2023	Falcon 9 Block 5	(Sweden) (Canada) EPICHyper-1	AAC Clyde Space / Wyvern	Success
Guardian	ION SCV-010 Masterful Matthaeus	15 April 2023	Falcon 9 Block 5	(Canada) Kepler-20, 21	Kepler Communications	Success
Guardian	ION SCV-010 Masterful Matthaeus	15 April 2023	Falcon 9 Block 5	(Brazil) VCUB1	Visiona	Success
Guardian	ION SCV-010 Masterful Matthaeus	15 April 2023	Falcon 9 Block 5	(Belgium) MicroCMG (hosted)	Veoware	Success
Guardian	ION SCV-010 Masterful Matthaeus	15 April 2023	Falcon 9 Block 5	(Italy) SCORPIO (hosted)	Elettronica Group	Success
Above the Sky	ION SCV-011 Savvy Simon	12 June 2023	Falcon 9 Block 5	(Sweden) (Canada) EPICHyper-2	AAC Clyde Space / Wyvern	Success
Above the Sky	ION SCV-011 Savvy Simon	12 June 2023	Falcon 9 Block 5	(Sweden) (United States) Kelpie-2	AAC Clyde Space / Orbcomm	Success
Above the Sky	ION SCV-011 Savvy Simon	12 June 2023	Falcon 9 Block 5	(United States) Outpost Mission 1	Outpost Space	Success
Above the Sky	ION SCV-011 Savvy Simon	12 June 2023	Falcon 9 Block 5	(Vatican City) (Italy) SpeiSat	Dicastery for Communication / ASI	Success
Above the Sky	ION SCV-011 Savvy Simon	12 June 2023	Falcon 9 Block 5	(European Union) ELO-4	Eutelsat	Success
Above the Sky	ION SCV-011 Savvy Simon	12 June 2023	Falcon 9 Block 5	(Germany) AlbaPod × 2 (hosted)	Alba Orbital	Success
Above the Sky	ION SCV-011 Savvy Simon	12 June 2023	Falcon 9 Block 5	(Switzerland) NaviLEOTM (hosted)	SpacePNT	Success
Above the Sky	ION SCV-011 Savvy Simon	12 June 2023	Falcon 9 Block 5	(United Kingdom) ODIN-DU1 (hosted)	ODIN Space	Success
Above the Sky	ION SCV-011 Savvy Simon	12 June 2023	Falcon 9 Block 5	(United Kingdom) UKRI SWIMMR-1 (hosted)	UKRI	Success
Cosmic Wander	ION SCV-013 Ultimate Hugo	11 November 2023	Falcon 9 Block 5	(United States) Crypto3	Cryptosat	Success
Cosmic Wander	ION SCV-013 Ultimate Hugo	11 November 2023	Falcon 9 Block 5	(Sweden) (Canada) EPICHyper-3	AAC Clyde Space / Wyvern	Success
Cosmic Wander	ION SCV-013 Ultimate Hugo	11 November 2023	Falcon 9 Block 5	(Sweden) (Poland) Intuition-1	AAC Clyde Space / KP Labs	Success
Cosmic Wander	ION SCV-013 Ultimate Hugo	11 November 2023	Falcon 9 Block 5	(United States) Lemur-2 NANAZ	Spire Global	Success
Cosmic Wander	ION SCV-013 Ultimate Hugo	11 November 2023	Falcon 9 Block 5	(United States) OSW Cazorla	Odyssey SpaceWorks	Success
Cosmic Wander	ION SCV-013 Ultimate Hugo	11 November 2023	Falcon 9 Block 5	(Italy) PiCo-IoT × 9	Apogeo Space	Success
Cosmic Wander	ION SCV-013 Ultimate Hugo	11 November 2023	Falcon 9 Block 5	(Sweden) (United States) Ymir-1	AAC Clyde Space / Saab AB / Orbcomm	Success
Cosmic Wander	ION SCV-013 Ultimate Hugo	11 November 2023	Falcon 9 Block 5	(Germany) AlbaPod × 2 (hosted)	Alba Orbital	Success
Cosmic Wander	ION SCV-013 Ultimate Hugo	11 November 2023	Falcon 9 Block 5	(Poland) Antelope (hosted)	KP Labs	Success
Cosmic Wander	ION SCV-013 Ultimate Hugo	11 November 2023	Falcon 9 Block 5	(Italy) Gen-03 (hosted)	Genergo	Success
Cosmic Wander	ION SCV-013 Ultimate Hugo	11 November 2023	Falcon 9 Block 5	(Italy) Radiosat&Beamasat (hosted)	PICOSATS	Success
Beyond	ION SCV-015 Daring Diego	1 December 2023	Falcon 9 Block 5	(Spain) ALISIO-1	IAC	Success
Beyond	ION SCV-015 Daring Diego	1 December 2023	Falcon 9 Block 5	(Thailand) LOGSATS	Patriot Infovention	Success
Beyond	ION SCV-015 Daring Diego	1 December 2023	Falcon 9 Block 5	(Germany) NanoFF A, B	TU Berlin	Success
Beyond	ION SCV-015 Daring Diego	1 December 2023	Falcon 9 Block 5	(Germany) AlbaPod (hosted)	Alba Orbital	Success
Beyond	ION SCV-015 Daring Diego	1 December 2023	Falcon 9 Block 5	(United States) MI:1 (hosted)	TRL11	Success
Beyond	ION SCV-015 Daring Diego	1 December 2023	Falcon 9 Block 5	(United States) Pono 1 (hosted)	Privateer	Success
Beyond	ION SCV-015 Daring Diego	1 December 2023	Falcon 9 Block 5	(Italy) RECS (hosted)	Polimi	Success
Beyond	ION SCV-015 Daring Diego	1 December 2023	Falcon 9 Block 5	(New Zealand) Z01 SuperTorquer (hosted)	Zenno Astronautics	Success
Celestial Bliss	ION SCV-012 Magnificent Monica	16 August 2024	Falcon 9 Block 5	(United States) Lemur-2 × 4	Spire Global	Success
Celestial Bliss	ION SCV-012 Magnificent Monica	16 August 2024	Falcon 9 Block 5	(United States) Sedna-1	AAC SpaceQuest	Success
Celestial Bliss	ION SCV-012 Magnificent Monica	16 August 2024	Falcon 9 Block 5	(United States) Poseidon M1.5	Miles Space	Success
Celestial Bliss	ION SCV-012 Magnificent Monica	16 August 2024	Falcon 9 Block 5	(South Korea) TetraPLEX (hosted)	TelePIX	Success
Ascend	ION SCV-014 Eminent Emmanuel	14 January 2025	Falcon 9 Block 5	(United Kingdom) Data DOT × 4	Space Dots	Success
Ascend	ION SCV-014 Eminent Emmanuel	14 January 2025	Falcon 9 Block 5	(United Kingdom) SWIMMR	UK Research and Innovation	Success
Ascend	ION SCV-014 Eminent Emmanuel	14 January 2025	Falcon 9 Block 5	(Germany) AlbaPod PocketQube (hosted)	Alba Orbital	Success
Ascend	ION SCV-014 Eminent Emmanuel	14 January 2025	Falcon 9 Block 5	(United States) Poseidon M1.5	Miles Space	Success
Endelss Sky	ION SCV-016 Amazing Antonius	14 January 2025	Falcon 9 Block 5	(Thailand) LOGSATS-2	EOS Orbit	Success
Endelss Sky	ION SCV-016 Amazing Antonius	14 January 2025	Falcon 9 Block 5	(Portugal) PoSAT-2	LusoSpace	Success
Endelss Sky	ION SCV-016 Amazing Antonius	14 January 2025	Falcon 9 Block 5	(United States) Mission Impossible: 2 (hosted)	TRL11	Success
Endelss Sky	ION SCV-016 Amazing Antonius	14 January 2025	Falcon 9 Block 5	(France) Hitchhiker 1	SpaceLocker	Success
Endelss Sky	ION SCV-016 Amazing Antonius	14 January 2025	Falcon 9 Block 5	(United States) K2 Space Component Mission (hosted)	K2 Space	Success
Endelss Sky	ION SCV-016 Amazing Antonius	14 January 2025	Falcon 9 Block 5	(Italy) AI-eXpress (AIXp)	Planetek	Success
Wish Upon a Star	ION SCV-017 Marvelous Mathias	15 March 2025	Falcon 9 Block 5	(Thailand) LOGSATS-2	EOS Orbit	Success
Wish Upon a Star	ION SCV-017 Marvelous Mathias	15 March 2025	Falcon 9 Block 5	(Italy) HERMES-SP × 6	Italian Space Agency	Success
Wish Upon a Star	ION SCV-017 Marvelous Mathias	15 March 2025	Falcon 9 Block 5	(Portugal) DARK (hosted)	Arkadia Space	Success
Wish Upon a Star	ION SCV-017 Marvelous Mathias	15 March 2025	Falcon 9 Block 5	(Germany) GO-2 Propulsion System (hosted)	Morpheus Space	Success
Wish Upon a Star	ION SCV-017 Marvelous Mathias	15 March 2025	Falcon 9 Block 5	(Switzerland) Clustergate-1	DPhi Space	Success
Wish Upon a Star	ION SCV-017 Marvelous Mathias	15 March 2025	Falcon 9 Block 5	(United States) Shooting Star Memorial	Beyond Burials	Success
Space Bound	ION SCV Charismatic Carlus	23 June 2025	Falcon 9 Block 5	(United States) Lemur	Spire	Success
Space Bound	ION SCV Charismatic Carlus	23 June 2025	Falcon 9 Block 5	(Japan) PBI (hosted)	Pale Blue	Success
Space Bound	ION SCV Charismatic Carlus	23 June 2025	Falcon 9 Block 5	(United Kingdom) Rogue Thrusters (hosted)	Magdrive	Success
Space Bound	ION SCV Charismatic Carlus	23 June 2025	Falcon 9 Block 5	(France) Early Test Payload (hosted)	Constellation Global	Success
Skytrail	ION SCV Passionate Paula	23 June 2025	Falcon 9 Block 5	(South Korea) DNAV (Deep Space Navigation) (payload)	telePIX	Success
Skytrail	ION SCV Passionate Paula	23 June 2025	Falcon 9 Block 5	(Italy) AI-eXpress (AIX) (hosted)	Planetek Italia	Success
Skytrail	ION SCV Passionate Paula	23 June 2025	Falcon 9 Block 5	(Germany) (Austria) (Italy) ROQuET - Reconfigurable lower Orbit Quantum Computer for Earth observation Technology (hosted)	University of Vienna; CNR Milano; DLR	Success
Ride With Me	ION SCV Galactic Georgius	28 November 2025	Falcon 9 Block 5	(United States) LEMUR-2-HOTSPUR-TOM	Spire	Success
Ride With Me	ION SCV Galactic Georgius	28 November 2025	Falcon 9 Block 5	(United States) Lacuna-5 and Lacuna-6	Spire	Success
Ride With Me	ION SCV Galactic Georgius	28 November 2025	Falcon 9 Block 5	(Italy) LaserCube Compact ISL 1000 (hosted)	Stellar Project; D-Orbit	Success
Ride With Me	ION SCV Galactic Georgius	28 November 2025	Falcon 9 Block 5	(United States) MS-1 / Mission Nicoló (hosted)	Spaceium	Success
Ride With Me	ION SCV Galactic Georgius	28 November 2025	Falcon 9 Block 5	(Japan) PBI (hosted)	Pale Blue	Success
We Need More Space	ION SCV Stellar Stephanus	1 December 2025	Falcon 9 Block 5	(United States) LEMUR-2-STARLIGHT and LEMUR-2-TARTIFLETTE	Spire	Success
We Need More Space	ION SCV Stellar Stephanus	1 December 2025	Falcon 9 Block 5	(United States) Lacuna-3 and Lacuna-4	Spire	Success
We Need More Space	ION SCV Stellar Stephanus	1 December 2025	Falcon 9 Block 5	(Finland) Foresail-1 prime (hosted)	Aalto University	Success
We Need More Space	ION SCV Stellar Stephanus	1 December 2025	Falcon 9 Block 5	(Italy) AI-eXpress 1 Plus (AIX-1+)(hosted)	Planetek Italia; D-Orbit; AIKO	Success
We Need More Space	ION SCV Stellar Stephanus	1 December 2025	Falcon 9 Block 5	(Italy) LaserCube Compact ISL 1000 (hosted)	Stellar Project; D-Orbit	Success
We Need More Space	ION SCV Stellar Stephanus	1 December 2025	Falcon 9 Block 5	(Australia) StardustMe SD-3 (hosted)	Stardust Me	Success
Wayfinder	ION SCV Astounding Alexandra	30 March 2026	Falcon 9 Block 5	(Portugal) Lusíada x 4 (Camões, Bessa, Saramago, Pessoa)	LusoSpace	Success
Wayfinder	ION SCV Astounding Alexandra	30 March 2026	Falcon 9 Block 5	(Turkey) QubitCore (hosted)	Qubitrium	Success
Wayfinder	ION SCV Astounding Alexandra	30 March 2026	Falcon 9 Block 5	(Germany) Camera SpaceMast (hosted)	DLR	Success

=== Planned missions ===
Mission Name	Spacecraft	Date	Launch Vehicle	Payload	Customers	Outcome

== See also ==
- NanoRacks CubeSat Deployer
- Vigoride
- SHERPA
- Orbiter
