= Satellite dispenser =

A satellite dispenser is a space tug usually released from the upper stage (sometimes called kick stage) of a rocket and designed to fly small secondary payloads to their desired location before deploying them.

Project West Ford launched 480,000,000 needles in space in 1961 and 1963 using a dispenser.

The company Moog Inc. launched a satellite dispenser on a Falcon 9 rocket on 14 July 2014, placing 6 Orbcomm satellites in orbit.

SHERPA is a satellite dispenser first launched on 3 December 2018 on a rideshare mission called SSO-A: SmallSat Express. The two SHERPA dispensers placed 64 satellites, after separating from the Falcon 9 Block 5 rocket once it entered a polar Sun-synchronous orbit around 575 kilometers above Earth.

Canisterized Satellite Dispenser is a satellite dispenser created by Planetary Systems Corp, launched on 17 April 2019 with the Cygnus NG-11 mission.

ION CubeSat Carrier is a satellite dispenser launched on 3 September 2020 on a Vega rocket, mission Vega flight VV16, and carried 12 SuperDove satellites from Planet Labs.

The company Launcher is developing an orbital transfer vehicle named Orbiter which will be able to carry up to 90U of cubesats or other smallsats.

== See also ==
- KickSat
- Space tug
