= Firefly Alpha =

Two-stage small satellite launch rocket

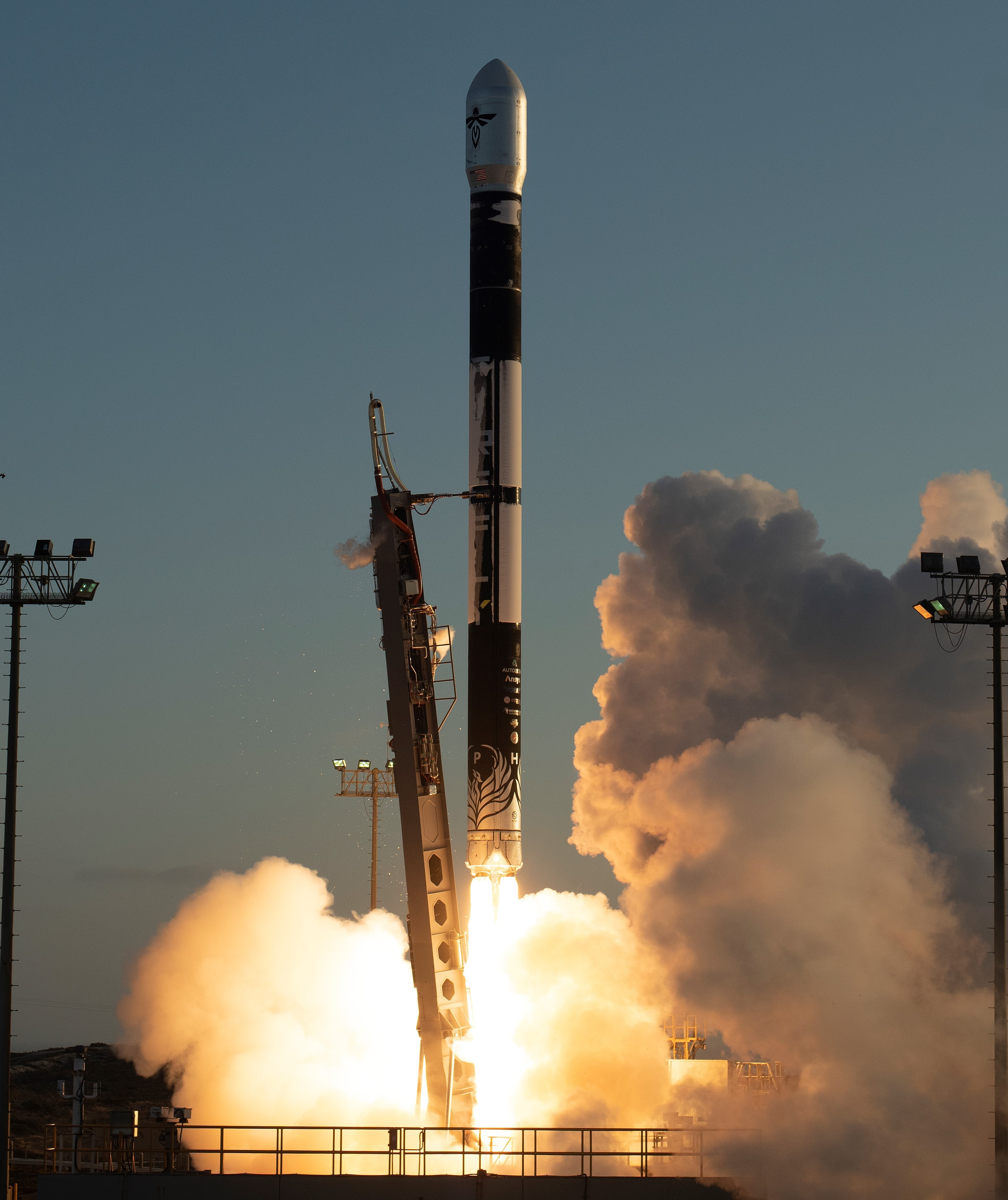
- Firefly Alpha lifting off the pad at Vandenberg Space Force Base on September 2, 2021
- Manufacturer: Firefly Aerospace
- Country of origin: United States
- Cost per launch: US$15–17.6 million

Size
- Height: 29 m (95 ft)
- Diameter: 1.82 m (6 ft)
- Mass: 54,000 kg (119,000 lb)
- Stages: 2

Capacity

Payload to LEO
- Mass: 1,030 kg (2,270 lb)

Payload to SSO
- Altitude: 500 km (310 mi)
- Mass: 630 kg (1,390 lb)

Associated rockets
- Comparable: Epsilon

Launch history
- Status: Active
- Launch sites: Vandenberg, SLC‑2W; Wallops, LP-0A (planned); Cape Canaveral, SLC-20 (planned); Esrange, LC-3C (planned)
- Total launches: 7
- Success(es): 3
- Failure: 2
- Partial failure: 2
- First flight: 3 September 2021
- Last flight: 12 March 2026

First stage
- Powered by: 4 × Reaver
- Maximum thrust: 736.1 kN (165,500 lb_{f})
- Specific impulse: 295.6 s (2.899 km/s)
- Propellant: RP-1 / LOX

Second stage
- Powered by: 1 × Lightning
- Maximum thrust: 70.1 kN (15,800 lb_{f})
- Specific impulse: 322 s (3.16 km/s)
- Propellant: RP-1 / LOX

Firefly Alpha (Firefly α) is a two-stage orbital expendable small lift launch vehicle developed by the American company Firefly Aerospace to compete in the commercial small satellite launch market. Alpha is intended to provide launch options for both full vehicle and rideshare customers.

The first launch attempt was on 3 September 2021, but the vehicle did not reach orbit when one of the first stage engines failed during ascent. A second orbital test flight took place on 1 October 2022 and successfully reached orbit. Alpha deployed 7 satellites. However, due to the lower-than-intended deployment orbit, most of the satellites re-entered before reaching their intended design life a week after launch. The first fully successful launch of Alpha took place on 15 September 2023.

== History ==
The initial 2014-vintage design of Alpha was two-stage-to-orbit vehicle with the first stage powered by an FRE-2 methalox engine, which consisted of twelve nozzles arranged in an aerospike configuration. The engine used methane and liquid oxygen as propellants, and completed a full-duration combustor test in September 2016. The second stage was to be propelled by the FRE-1 engine, which was to use a conventional bell nozzle. This version of Alpha was intended to carry 400 kg to low Earth orbit.

In 2015, NASA's Launch Services Program awarded Firefly Space Systems, the predecessor to Firefly Aerospace, a US$5.5 million Venture Class Launch Services contract to incentivize the development of Alpha, as part of a program to enable easier space access for the small satellite market.

After the March 2017 bankruptcy of Firefly Space Systems and corporate reorganization to become Firefly Aerospace with new owners and capital, the Alpha launch vehicle was redesigned to a much larger rocket, over twice as much capacity as the Alpha design of 2014. The version 2 Alpha vehicle still utilizes two stages to orbit, but now both are 1.8 m (5 ft 11 in) in diameter and use RP-1/LOX propellants. The main body of the rocket is constructed using a lightweight carbon composite material.

In March 2018, Firefly said that the development of Alpha was expected to cost approximately US$100 million.

In 2024, Firefly Aerospace announced plans to use a Horizontal Integration Facility (HIF) to integrate payloads at Wallops Island, Virginia.

The first test launch and Maiden flight of Firefly Alpha occurred on 3 September 2021 at 01:59 UTC, from a leased pad at Vandenberg Space Force Base in California, and was to fly southwest over the Pacific Ocean. Due to an engine failure caused by a fuel valve electrical connector shearing approximately 15 seconds after the launch, the rocket lost control at transonic speeds approximately two and a half minutes after launch that resulted in manual activation of the flight termination system and loss of the vehicle. The launch vehicle had onboard various payloads as part of Firefly's DREAM mission—including Benchmark Space BSS1, Firefly Capsule 1, and PICOBUS (intending to deploy six PocketQubes), Hiapo, Spinnaker3, and TIS Serenity—which were destroyed.

On 29 September 2025, the flight vehicle first stage planned for Alpha Flight 7 was destroyed in a ground test at the Firefly test facility in Briggs, Texas. The company has not yet completed an evaluation of how the test explosion may affect future launch cadence.

== Design ==
The Alpha first stage is powered by four Reaver LOX / RP-1 tap-off cycle engines, delivering 736 kN (165,000 lb_{f}) of thrust. The second stage is powered by one Lightning LOX / RP-1 engine, delivering 70.1 kN (15,800 lb_{f}) of thrust with a specific impulse (I_{sp}) of 322 seconds. Lightning 1 was test-run for nearly 5 minutes on 15 March 2018 during a long duration test fire on Firefly's Test Stand 1 in Briggs, Texas.

The Alpha airframe uses all carbon-fiber composite material in its construction. Using carbon-fiber makes the rocket more fuel efficient because the use of denser materials like titanium and aluminum would result in a heavier airframe, which would require more fuel to launch.

=== Intended usage ===
Alpha is designed to launch up to 1170 kg of payload to a 200 km low Earth orbit, or up to 745 kg payload to a 500 km Sun-synchronous orbit, suitable for CubeSats and other small payloads. Primary payloads can be integrated by themselves or with a secondary payload, with vehicle capacity for up to 6 CubeSats. This allows Firefly's customers to have a dedicated small-satellite launcher, reducing the issues of ridesharing payloads and secondary payloads. These smaller satellites can have an orbit that is not determined by a larger payload and can launch on their own schedule instead of waiting on the readiness of all other payloads.

Alpha is also intended to be a direct American competitor in the small satellite market to India's Polar Satellite Launch Vehicle (PSLV), as the company believes that PSLV's ride-share capability threatens U.S. domestic launchers in this market.

== Launch sites ==
Firefly Aerospace is leasing Vandenberg pad SLC-2W to support Firefly Alpha and Eclipse launches; this launch pad formerly supported Delta, Thor-Agena, and Delta II launch vehicles launches. Additionally, As of September 2024 Firefly holds a lease at Cape Canaveral Space Launch Complex 20 for low-inclination launches of Alpha in the future. Firefly is working with Northrop Grumman to use LP-0A at the Mid-Atlantic Regional Spaceport in Virginia, and has plans for a launch site at the Esrange Space Center in Sweden. Launches from Virginia and Sweden were expected as soon as 2026. As of June 2026, first launch from Esrange is planned in 2028.

== Launch history ==
Flight No.	Name	Date / time (UTC)	Rocket, configuration	Launch site	Payload	Orbit	Customer	Launch outcome
1	"DREAM"	3 September 2021; 01:59	Firefly Alpha Block I	Vandenberg, SLC-2W	Various	Retrograde LEO	Various	Failure
1	Maiden flight of the Firefly Alpha; carrying various payloads as part of their Dedicated Research and Education Accelerator Mission program. Due to an engine failure approximately 15 seconds after the launch, the rocket lost control at transonic speed approximately two and a half minutes after launch that resulted in the activation of the flight termination system and loss of the vehicle.							
2	"To The Black"	1 October 2022; 07:01	Firefly Alpha Block I	Vandenberg, SLC-2W	TechEdSat-15 (TES-15), TIS Serenity, PicoBus (deploying five PocketQubes)	Retrograde LEO	NASA Ames, SJSU, Teachers in Space, Inc., Libre Space Foundation, Fossa Systems, AMSAT-EA	Partial failure
2	First partially successful orbital launch, carrying educational payloads, including a hosted payload, Firefly Capsule 2. Alpha deployed 7 satellites; however, due to the lower than intended final deployment orbit (219 km x 279 km, intended 300 km), most of the satellites re-entered approximately a week after launch.							
3	"VICTUS NOX"	15 September 2023; 02:28	Firefly Alpha Block I	Vandenberg, SLC-2W	VICTUS NOX	SSO	U.S. Space Force (SSC)	Success
3	Tactically Responsive Space-3 (TacRS-3) mission to display rapid response launch capabilities — the payload was integrated and launched 27 hours after launch order were received from the customer. First fully successful launch of Alpha. Second stage performed a re-ignition for a controlled deorbit. VICTUS NOX decayed from orbit on January 28, 2025.							
4	"Fly The Lightning"	22 December 2023; 17:32	Firefly Alpha Block I	Vandenberg, SLC-2W	Tantrum	LEO	Lockheed Martin	Partial failure
4	Dedicated commercial launch, carrying an Electronically Steerable Antenna technology demonstrator payload for Lockheed Martin integrated on a Terran Orbital Nebula satellite bus. Stage 2 engine relight did not deliver the payload to its planned target orbit. Communications to the spacecraft were established and some mission operations took place. The satellite decayed on February 10, 2024, at approximately 15:00 UTC.							
5	"Noise Of Summer"	4 July 2024; 04:04	Firefly Alpha Block I	Vandenberg, SLC-2W	VCLS Demo-2FB	SSO	NASA	Success
5	NASA Venture Class Launch Services 2 (VCLS 2) Mission Two, officially known as VCLS Demo-2FB. The ELaNa 43 mission, consisting of eight CubeSats, launched on this flight.							
6	"Message In A Booster"	29 April 2025; 13:37	Firefly Alpha Block I	Vandenberg, SLC-2W	LM 400 Demo	LEO	Lockheed Martin	Failure
6	Carried an experimental satellite for Lockheed Martin in the first of 15 launches contracted through 2029, with options for 10 more. A mishap during stage separation damaged the second stage engine, substantially reducing thrust and preventing the payload from reaching orbital velocity.							
7	"Stairway To Seven"	12 March 2026; 00:50	Firefly Alpha Block I	Vandenberg, SLC-2W	Test payload	LEO	Firefly Aerospace	Success
7	Return-to-flight mission following the failure of "Message In A Booster" in April 2025. Test flight for validating various systems components to be used on Block II. Also carried a demonstrator payload for Lockheed Martin. Final Block I launch.							

== Future launches ==
Future launches are listed chronologically when firm plans are in place. The order of the later launches is much less certain. Launches are expected to take place "no earlier than" (NET) the listed date.

Date / time (UTC)	Rocket, configuration	Launch site	Payload	Orbit	Customer
Q2 2026	Firefly Alpha Block II	Vandenberg, SLC-2W	VICTUS HAZE Jackal	LEO	U.S. Space Force (SSC)
Q2 2026	Planned maiden flight of Block II. Part of the United States Space Force's Tactically Responsive Space (TacRS) program. Will carry the Jackal Autonomous Orbital Vehicle manufactured by True Anomaly.				
Q3 2026	Firefly Alpha Block II	Vandenberg, SLC-2W	QuickSounder	LEO	NOAA
Q3 2026	First satellite in NOAA's Near Earth Orbit Network (NEON) Program.				
2026	Firefly Alpha Block II	Vandenberg, SLC-2W	EOS SAR 1	SSO	EOS Data Analytics
2026	First EOS synthetic-aperture radar (SAR) constellation satellite.				
2026	Firefly Alpha Block II	Vandenberg, SLC-2W	TacSat	LEO	Lockheed Martin
2026	Second of 15 launches contracted by Lockheed Martin through 2029. Formerly slated to launch in Q2 2025.				
2026	Firefly Alpha Block II	Vandenberg, SLC-2W	OTB-2	LEO	General Atomics
2026	Part of General Atomics Electromagnetic Systems Group's Orbital Test Bed (OTB) program, designed to host experiments created by various customers.				
2026	Firefly Alpha Block II	Vandenberg, SLC-2W	VICTUS SOL	LEO	U.S. Space Force (SSC)
2026	Part of the United States Space Force's Tactically Responsive Space (TacRS) program.				
2026	Firefly Alpha Block II	Vandenberg, SLC-2W	TBA	LEO	L3Harris
2026	First of three dedicated launches for L3Harris.				
2026	Firefly Alpha Block II	Vandenberg, SLC-2W	TBA	LEO	L3Harris
2026	Second of three dedicated launches for L3Harris.				
2026	Firefly Alpha Block II	Vandenberg, SLC-2W	TBA	LEO	L3Harris
2026	Third of three dedicated launches for L3Harris.				
2027	Firefly Alpha Block II	MARS, LP-0A	INCUS	LEO	NASA
2027	Part of NASA's Venture-Class Acquisition of Dedicated and Rideshare (VADR) program. First announced Alpha launch from the Mid-Atlantic Regional Spaceport at Wallops.				
TBD	Firefly Alpha Block II	TBD	Dedicated rideshare mission	LEO	Spaceflight, Inc.
TBD	Dedicated smallsat rideshare mission to low Earth orbit utilizing Firefly's Elytra Dawn orbital tug.				
TBD	Firefly Alpha Block II	TBD	Satlantis EO Constellation	LEO	Satlantis
TBD	Satlantis earth observation satellite constellation.				

== See also ==
- Rocket Lab Electron
- Vega – European Space Agency launch system
- Polar Satellite Launch Vehicle – Indian expendable launch vehicle
- Small Satellite Launch Vehicle – Indian small-lift launch vehicle
- Small-lift launch vehicle
