= HSWN =

HSWN is the four letter abbreviation used for the following:

- Heraklion Student Wireless Network, a Greek wireless network
- Homeland Security Weatherbug Network, a joint collaboration between the National Weather Service and the creators of the Weatherbug program encompassing about 8,000 weather stations in the United States
