= Vigoride =

Space tug by Momentus Space

- Function: Space tug
- Manufacturer: Momentus space
- Country of origin: United States

Capacity

Payload to low Earth orbit
- Mass: 750 kg (1,650 lb)

Launch history
- Status: Operational
- Total launches: 3
- Success(es): 2

Vigoride is a space tug developed and operated by Momentus Space. The total payload capacity that it can support to LEO is 750 kg. Vigoride is capable of changing orbital planes, inclination, and propelling spacecraft to up to 2 km/s. It also provides small satellite operators access to power, communications, and station keeping while with the tug. Momentus states that the cost is roughly $15,000 per kg depending on the exact customer specifications. Vigoride uses a microwave electrothermal thruster (MET) and water as the propellant. In 2019, the first test of the MET in space was completed and was deemed a success in a press release, while the U.S. Securities and Exchange Commission accused it of misleading investors. The maiden launch was originally scheduled for January 2021, but was delayed due to Momentus not being able to receive FAA approval before the launch. On 22 March 2021, a Vigoride mock-up named Vigoride SC was launched in place of a functional Vigoride. In October 2020, the company stated that it had already booked 1.5 Vigorides out of the 3 planned to be launched in December 2021. On 25 May 2022, Momentus launched its first Vigoride spacecraft aboard SpaceX Transporter 5 mission.

== Missions ==
=== Past missions ===
Mission Name	Spacecraft	Date	Launch Vehicle	Payload	Customer	Outcome
Demo 1	Vigoride-3	25 May 2022	(United States) Falcon 9 Block 5	(Norway) SelfieSat	Orbit NTNU	Partial failure
Demo 1	Vigoride-3	25 May 2022	(United States) Falcon 9 Block 5	(United States) Veery-FS1	Care Weather	Partial failure
Demo 1	Vigoride-3	25 May 2022	(United States) Falcon 9 Block 5	(Spain) FOSSASAT-2E x7	FOSSA Systems	Partial failure
Demo 1	(third party port)	25 May 2022	(United States) Falcon 9 Block 5	(United States) BRONCOSAT-1	Cal Poly Pomona	Success
Demo 2 (Proximus Gradus)	Vigoride-5	3 January 2023	(United States) Falcon 9 Block 5	(Singapore) ZEUS-1	Qosmosys / NuSpace	Success
Demo 2 (Proximus Gradus)	Vigoride-5	3 January 2023	(United States) Falcon 9 Block 5	(United States) SSPD-1 (hosted)	Caltech	Success
Tertio In Orbita	Vigoride-6	15 April 2023	(United States) Falcon 9 Block 5	(Denmark) DISCO-1	Aarhus University	Success
Tertio In Orbita	Vigoride-6	15 April 2023	(United States) Falcon 9 Block 5	(Taiwan) IRIS-C	NCKU	Success
Tertio In Orbita	Vigoride-6	15 April 2023	(United States) Falcon 9 Block 5	(United States) LLITED-A	NASA	Success
Tertio In Orbita	Vigoride-6	15 April 2023	(United States) Falcon 9 Block 5	(United States) LLITED-B	NASA	Success
Tertio In Orbita	Vigoride-6	15 April 2023	(United States) Falcon 9 Block 5	(Italy) REVELA	ARCA Dynamics	Success
Tertio In Orbita	Vigoride-6	15 April 2023	(United States) Falcon 9 Block 5	(Hungary) VIREO	C3S	Success
Tertio In Orbita	Vigoride-6	15 April 2023	(United States) Falcon 9 Block 5	(Italy) SMPOD03 (hosted)	ARCA Dynamics	Success
Tertio In Orbita	Vigoride-6	15 April 2023	(United States) Falcon 9 Block 5	(United States) TApe Spring Solar Array (TASSA) (hosted)	Momentus space	Success
?	ISIL deployer	11 November 2023	(United States) Falcon 9 Block 5	(United States) Gossamer Vendelinus (Picacho)	Lunasonde	Failure
?	ISIL deployer	11 November 2023	(United States) Falcon 9 Block 5	(South Korea) Jinjusat-1	Contec Co.	Failure
?	ISIL deployer	11 November 2023	(United States) Falcon 9 Block 5	(Poland) (Oman) STORK-7 / AMAN-1	SatRevolution	Failure
?	ISIL deployer	11 November 2023	(United States) Falcon 9 Block 5	(Turkey) Hello Test 1	Hello Space	Success
?	ISIL deployer	11 November 2023	(United States) Falcon 9 Block 5	(Turkey) Hello Test 2	Hello Space	Success

=== Upcoming missions ===
Mission Name	Date	Launch Vehicle	Payload	Customer
Vigoride-7 (SpaceX Transporter 16)	NET February 2026	(United States) Falcon 9 Block 5	(United States) NOM4D	DARPA
Vigoride-7 (SpaceX Transporter 16)	NET February 2026	(United States) Falcon 9 Block 5	(United States) RPO Demo	AFRL
Vigoride-7 (SpaceX Transporter 16)	NET February 2026	(United States) Falcon 9 Block 5	(United States) Deke Space Communicator	Solstar Space
Delayed or Unassigned Payloads	NET 2025	TBA	(Denmark) DISCO-2	Aarhus University
Delayed or Unassigned Payloads	NET 2025	TBA	(Spain) PocketPod Deployer (8p)	FOSSA Systems
Delayed or Unassigned Payloads	NET 2025	TBA	(Singapore) ZEUS-2	Qosmosys / NuSpace
Delayed or Unassigned Payloads	NET 2025	TBA	(Turkey) HelloPod	Hello Space
Delayed or Unassigned Payloads	NET 2025	TBA	(United States) OreSat0.5	Portland State University
Delayed or Unassigned Payloads	NET 2025	TBA	(Italy) PiCo × 9	Apogeo Space
Delayed or Unassigned Payloads	NET 2025	TBA	(Spain) CLIP+ [FP002]	FOSSA Systems
Delayed or Unassigned Payloads	NET 2025	TBA	(United States) Crypto-3A	Cryptosat
Delayed or Unassigned Payloads	NET 2025	TBA	(Luxembourg) Triton-X (hosted)	LuxSpace
Delayed or Unassigned Payloads	NET 2025	TBA	(Senegal) Gaindesat	Ride! Space
Delayed or Unassigned Payloads	NET 2025	TBA	Djibouti	Ride! Space
Delayed or Unassigned Payloads	NET 2025	TBA	(Spain) FOSSASAT FEROX x?	FOSSA Systems
Delayed or Unassigned Payloads	NET 2025	TBA	(United States) (Luxembourg) Vigoride Robotic Arm Demo (Hosted Payload)	Redwire (Made In Space) / Momentus Space
Delayed or Unassigned Payloads	NET 2025	TBA	(Hungary) Undisclosed Satellites	C3S
