= SBUDNIC =

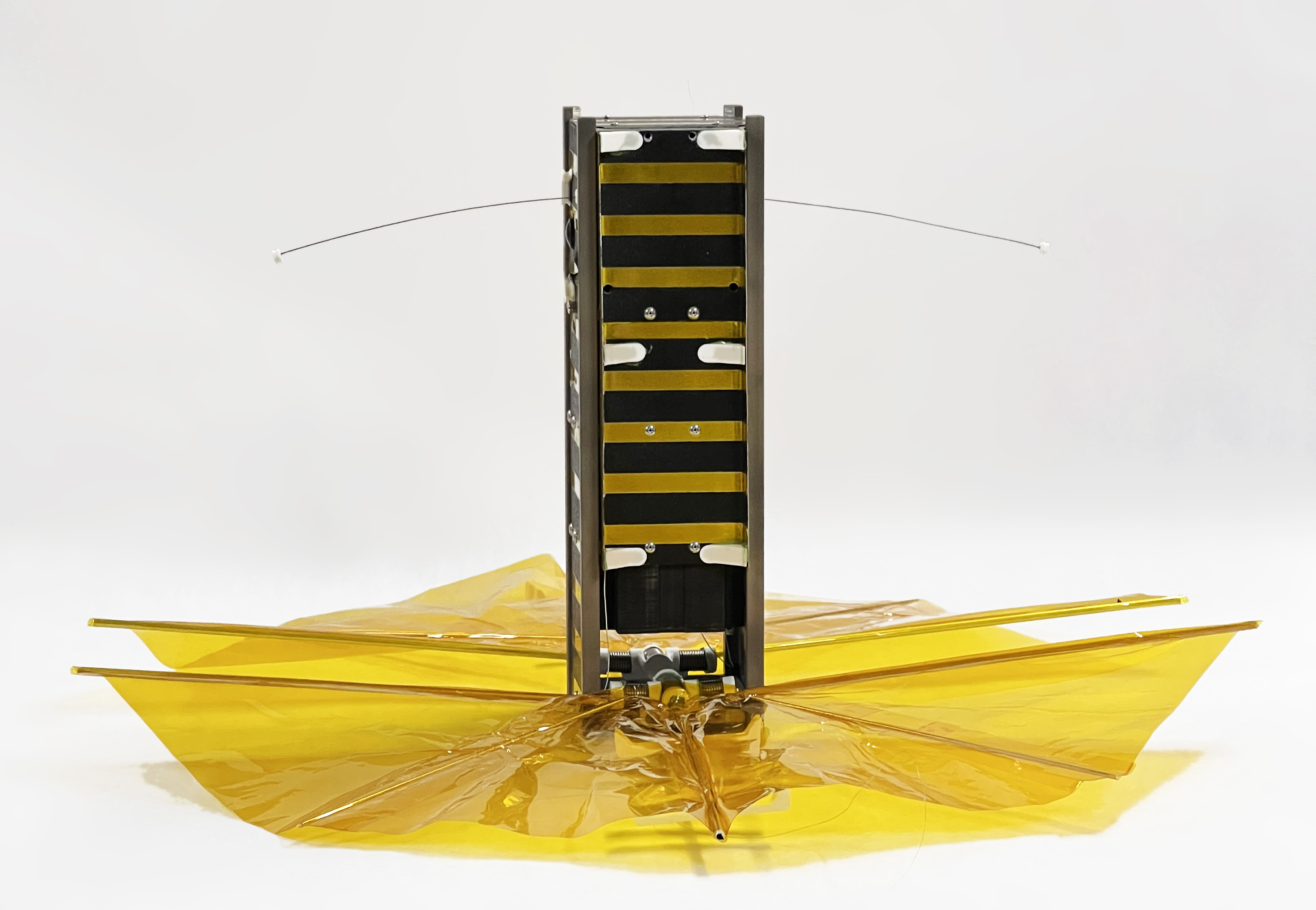
- SBUDNIC before launch in March, 2022
- Mission type: Education
- COSPAR ID: 2022-057AU
- SATCAT no.: 52774
- Website: www.sbudnic.space
- Mission duration: 3–6 months planned

Spacecraft properties
- Spacecraft type: 3U CubeSat
- Manufacturer: Brown University SBUDNIC Team
- Dry mass: 5.5 kilograms (12 lb)
- Dimensions: 10cm x 10cm x 30cm

End of mission
- Decay date: 10 August 2023

SBUDNIC was a 3U (one unit) CubeSat designed and built by an interdisciplinary group of undergraduate and graduate students at Brown University and the National Research Council of Italy, for research and educational purposes.

== Overview ==
The satellite was an open-source hardware project designed to be cheaply and easily reproduced, using commercial off-the-shelf parts like an Arduino Nano and AA Energizer batteries.

== History ==
The project was financed by Brown's Undergraduate Finance Board, the National Research Council of Italy, and Rhode Island's NASA Space Grant Consortium.

The satellite was deployed on 9 June 2022 from D-Orbit's ION Satellite Carrier on the SpaceX Falcon 9 Transporter 5 mission.

The satellite decayed from orbit on 10 August 2023.
