= WeatherBug =

American weather information service

- Operating system: Desktop; Microsoft Windows, macOS, Linux; Mobile; Android,iOS, Windows OS
- Website: weatherbug.com

WeatherBug is a brand based in New York City that provides location-based advertising to businesses. WeatherBug consists of a mobile app reporting live and forecast data on hyperlocal weather to consumer users.

== History ==
Originally owned by Automated Weather Source, the WeatherBug brand was founded by Bob Marshall and other partners in 1993. It started in the education market by selling weather tracking stations and educational software to public and private schools and then used the data from the stations on their website. Later, the company began partnering with TV stations so that broadcasters could use WeatherBug's local data and camera shots in their weather reports.

In 2000, the WeatherBug desktop application and website were launched. Later, the company launched WeatherBug and WeatherBug Elite as smartphone apps for iOS and Android, which won an APPY app design award in 2013. The company also sells a lightning tracking safety system that is used by schools and parks in southern Florida and elsewhere.

The company used lightning detection sensors throughout Guinea in Africa to track storms as they develop and has more than 50 lightning detection sensors in Brazil. Earth Networks received The Award for Outstanding Services to Meteorology by a Corporation in 2014 from the American Meteorological Society for "developing innovative lightning detection data products that improve severe-storm monitoring and warnings."

WeatherBug announced in 2004 it had been certified to display the TRUSTe privacy seal on its website. In 2005, Microsoft AntiSpyware flagged the application as a low-risk spyware threat. According to the company, the desktop application is not spyware because it is incapable of tracking users' overall Web use or deciphering anything on their hard drive.

In early 2011, AWS Convergence Technologies, Inc. (formerly Automated Weather Source) changed its name to Earth Networks, Inc.

In April 2013, WeatherBug was the second most popular weather information service on the Internet, behind only The Weather Channel's Web site, and ahead of the sites run by Weather Underground and AccuWeather.

In November 2016, it was announced that xAd acquired WeatherBug from Earth Networks.

In June 2017, xAd rebranded as GroundTruth to reflect a change in company focus from advertising to media and data services.

In May 2026, it was announced that WeatherBug would be changing their logo to a more refined look.

== Mobile application ==
WeatherBug
- Developer: WeatherBug
- Release: Android: November 2008
- Platform: Android; iOS; Windows OS
- Website: https://www.weatherbug.com

The company developed WeatherBug, a mobile application of their service for Android, iOS and Windows Phone platforms. Spark is a component of the WeatherBug app that reports where the nearest lightning strike is to the user based on data from the Total Lightning Network (run by WeatherBug's former owner, Earth Networks) and your phone's GPS location.

WeatherBug is a mobile application created by WeatherBug for Android and iOS platforms. An iPhone version was available in October 2007, and the Android version was released in November 2008 and 2009.

== See also ==
- AccuWeather
- MyRadar
