= MyRadar =

Weather forecasting application

Coordinates: 28°32′42″N 81°22′53″W

- Developer: ACME AtronOmatic LLC
- Release: January 24, 2012; 14 years ago
- Operating system: Desktop; Microsoft Windows; Mobile; Android, iOS
- Type: Weather forecasting
- Website: Official website

MyRadar is a free weather forecasting application developed by Andy Green and his Orlando, Florida-based company ACME AtronOmatic (ACME). The app began operations in 2008 and ran on government-provided weather and radar data for its first decade. In 2019, ACME launched personal satellites to improve weather predictions. The app received funding from the Federal Communications Commission (FCC), National Oceanic and Atmospheric Administration (NOAA), and the Office of Naval Research (ONR) to improve its radar and imaging capabilities. ACME created a weather data satellite constellation named "Hyperspectral Orbital Remote Imaging Spectrometer" (HORIS), which utilizes machine learning and artificial intelligence (AI) to create a current weather map. With the introduction of additional features, including wildfire and illegal fishing detection, the app has become an environmental intelligence app since 2022. In 2024, the app partnered with the Total Traffic and Weather Network (TTWN) to provide traffic flow and incident data for users with paying subscriptions via CarPlay and Android Auto.

== History ==
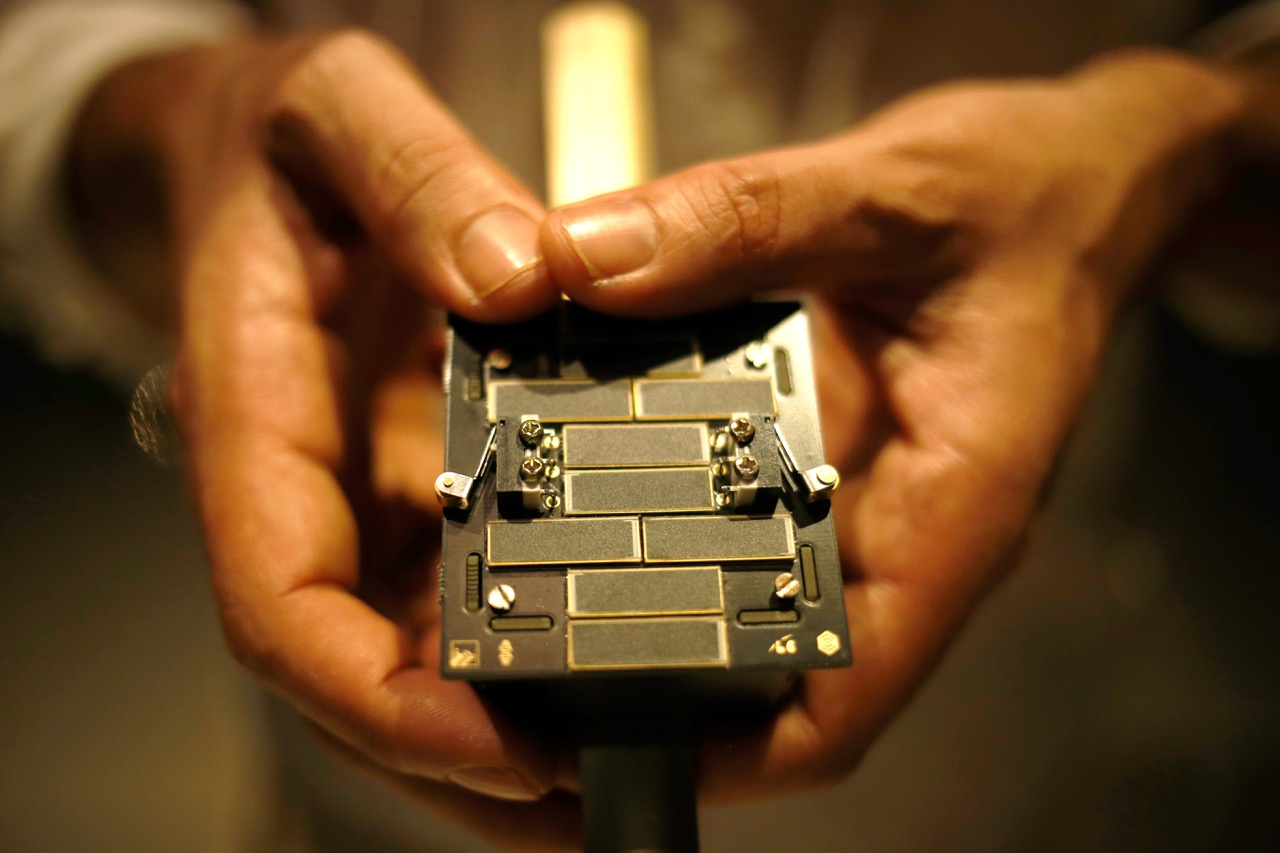
A close-up of a PocketQube satellite

The app's creator, Andy Green, has worked in internet technology since the 1980s. His first major project was the development of a public access internet service company based in Rhode Island, which he later sold to finance the creation of ACME AtronOmatic ("ACME" for short), based in Orlando, Florida. The first major app created by ACME was called "Flightwise", which provided users with flight tracking information. In summer 2008, Green had the idea to use the animated location tracker built into Flightwise to make a stand-alone weather forecasting app after wondering if he would get rained out while eating a meal outdoors. MyRadar was launched in 2012 out of an office in Orlando. In December 2017, the app partnered with "TripIt" to provide users with information about flight delays and gate changes, eliminating the need for a separate app like Flightwise.

In 2019, ACME launched their first personal satellite for the app, a small prototype from New Zealand, as part of an effort to provide detailed imagery and improved predictions of ongoing weather unique to the app. More satellites were eventually launched by ACME to create a weather data satellite constellation named "Hyperspectral Orbital Remote Imaging Spectrometer" (HORIS), monitored by ground stations maintained by Kongsberg Satellite Services. HORIS operates MyRadar by taking the environmental data and imagery it collects and pairing it with machine learning and artificial intelligence (AI) to create a real-time weather map. In 2022, HORIS was expanded upon after ACME won approval from the Federal Communications Commission (FCC) to improve their satellite constellation to include 250 satellites or more.

A screenshot of MyRadar

The main batch of satellites were PocketQubes, which entered the atmosphere on May 2, 2022, by Rocket Lab Electron launched from New Zealand, with the additional purpose to test and validate the existing satellites in orbit. In October 2022, ACME received a US$150,000 Small Business Innovation Research (SBIR) grant from the National Oceanic and Atmospheric Administration (NOAA) to improve the app's wildfire detection and air quality measurement technology to better detect smoke, aerosols, fire hotspots using satellites and aerial drones. On August 18, 2023, phase two of the NOAA grant was approved, providing an additional $650,000 to aid in the app's aforementioned goals by launching a pair of CubeSat satellites to provide high-definition infrared imagery. On September 8, 2023, ACME secured another $1,200,000 in crowd funding to aid accomplishing the goals of the NOAA grant by expanding the app's workforce from 35 to 100 employees by the end of 2024.

In January 2024, MyRadar partnered with Total Traffic and Weather Network (TTWN) to provide traffic data overlaid with its pre-existing weather graphics for users in the United States. The partnership allowed for the app to additionally become a tool for navigation. This officially became a feature days later on January 8, 2024, when the app was made compatible with Apple's CarPlay. On February 7, 2024, the Android equivalent Android Auto also gained the ability to display the app on car interfaces. In March 2024, the app launched a "meteorological wedding planning service" in the United States and Canada for prices between US$1,000 and $5,000, in which users can request a personal meteorologist to provide an in-person meeting about the best dates for a wedding, and on-call local weather updates. Scheduled for February 2025, four more satellites to help with the NOAA-sponsored wildfire detection are to be launched, and the first by ACME to have AI processing in the satellites themselves and not computers on the ground, allowing for quicker transfer of information.

== Features and general information ==
The app's primary function is to provide weather forecasting and predictions to users. The app includes toggleable options to track and send alerts to users for rain, wind patterns, earthquakes, tornadoes, tropical cyclones, wildfires, and more. In early 2020, a feature was added to track orbital objects such as the International Space Station. In May 2022, with the imagery improvement of HORIS, the app gained the secondary abilities to better monitor algae blooms, coral reefs, illegal fishing, and wildfires. In January and February 2024, the ability to display traffic flow and incident data in a feature called "RouteCast" was added, and can be displayed in video and 3D options via CarPlay and Android Auto for users with paying subscriptions. The app also provides annual tropical storm and tornado outlooks for their respective seasons, gathered through satellite and aerial drone data, as well as through on-the-ground storm chasers.

== See also ==
- AccuWeather
- WeatherBug
