= Federația Română de Radioamatorism =

Romanian radio nonprofit organization

Federaţia Română de Radioamatorism Romanian Federation of Amateur Radio
- Formation: 1926(original federation), 1950 (re-formed)
- Type: Non-profit organization
- Purpose: Advocacy, Education
- Location(s): Bucharest, Romania; KN34bk
- Region served: Romania
- Official language: Romanian
- Affiliations: International Amateur Radio Union
- Staff: 3
- Website: http://www.hamradio.ro/

The Federaţia Română de Radioamatorism (FRR) (in English, Romanian Federation of Amateur Radio) is a national non-profit organization for amateur radio enthusiasts in Romania that serves as a national governing body for amateur radio competitions. FRR represents the interests of its members before Romanian and international telecommunications regulatory authorities. FRR is the national member society representing Romania in the International Amateur Radio Union.

== See also ==
- International Amateur Radio Union
