= Launcher (company) =

American aerospace company

Launcher is an American aerospace company based in Hawthorne, California. It was founded in New York City in 2017 by Max Haot.

In February 2019 the company presented its E-2 engine, which was made in Germany by AMCM using its specialized M4K printer. The engine uses liquid oxygen and kerosene propellants. The company's Launcher Light rocket was designed to carry payloads of up to 150 kg to low Earth orbit.

In November 2019 the US Air Force awarded the company $1.5 million to accelerate development and testing of its E-2 rocket engine.

In March 2021 Launcher moved its headquarters from New York to a 24,000-square-foot building in Hawthorne, California.

In February 2023 Launcher was acquired by Vast, a startup company developing artificial gravity space stations, with Max Haot becoming Vast's president.

== Orbiter ==
The company has developed an orbital transfer vehicle named Orbiter that uses ethane and nitrous oxide as propellants for use as the third stage of the canceled Light rocket, or for use on other launch vehicles. In June 2021, the company raised $11.7 million in a Series-A round of funding to accelerate the development of its first orbital vehicle. Orbiter is compatible with both Launcher Light and SpaceX Falcon rideshare flights.

SN1, Orbiter's first mission was launched on January 3, 2023, from Cape Canaveral, Florida on SpaceX's Falcon 9 Transporter-6 rideshare flight, transporting payload from eight customers. SN1 failed shortly after deployment, with all but one customer payloads lost.

Following Vast's acquisition of Launcher the Orbiter program was discontinued, with the company now focusing on the development of the E-2 liquid rocket engine.

=== Missions ===
Mission	Date	Launch vehicle	Payload	Customer	Outcome
SN1	January 3, 2023	Falcon 9 Block 5	(Argentina) MDQSAT-1A, 1B	Innova Space	Failure
SN1	January 3, 2023	Falcon 9 Block 5	USA PROVES – Yearling	Cal Poly Pomona	Failure
SN1	January 3, 2023	Falcon 9 Block 5	(United States) Sapling-1	Stanford Student Space Initiative	Failure
SN1	January 3, 2023	Falcon 9 Block 5	(Germany) Unicorn-2G, 2H	Alba Orbital	Failure
SN1	January 3, 2023	Falcon 9 Block 5	(Italy) ?	NPC Spacemind	Failure
SN1	January 3, 2023	Falcon 9 Block 5	(United States) SAVER (hosted)	TRL11	Failure
SN1	January 3, 2023	Falcon 9 Block 5	(United States) Shooting Star Memorial (hosted)	Beyond Burials	Failure
SN1	January 3, 2023	Falcon 9 Block 5	(Switzerland) ? (hosted)	Logitech Mevo	Failure
SN3	June 12, 2023	Falcon 9 Block 5	(Argentina) MDQSAT-1C, 1D	Innova Space	Partial failure
SN3	June 12, 2023	Falcon 9 Block 5	(United States) Otter Pup	Starfish Space	Partial failure
SN3	June 12, 2023	Falcon 9 Block 5	(United States) Pleiades-Squared	Cal Poly Pomona	Partial failure
SN3	June 12, 2023	Falcon 9 Block 5	(United States) Nightingale 1 (hosted)	CesiumAstro	Partial failure
SN3	June 12, 2023	Falcon 9 Block 5	(United States) TRL11-SN3-Demo (hosted)	TRL11	Partial failure
SN3	June 12, 2023	Falcon 9 Block 5	(United States) Remora (hosted)	Millennium Space Systems	Partial failure
SN4	October 2023	Falcon 9 Block 5			Canceled
SN5	January 2024	Falcon 9 Block 5			Canceled

== See also ==
- List of private spaceflight companies
- Relativity Space
- Isar Aerospace
- Rocket Factory Augsburg AG
- Vector Launch
- Orbex
- Skyrora
- PLD Space
- Radian Aerospace
