= FOSSA Systems =

Satellite manufacturing company

FOSSA
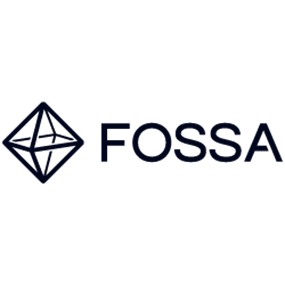
- Type: Private
- Industry: IoT, connectivity, spacecraft design, telecommunications
- Founded: 2020
- Headquarters: Madrid, Spain
- Area served: Worldwide
- Key people: Julián Fernandez Barcellona, Vicente Gonzalez Negro, Sergio Sarasola
- Services: Nanosatellites, Satellite Connectivity, IoT Solutions
- Number of employees: 40 (as of August 2025)
- Website: https://fossa.systems/

FOSSA Systems is a company based in Madrid, Spain and Lisbon, Portugal, specializing in satellite manufacturing and IoT solutions. Their services include space-related technologies and solutions for IoT applications. The company operates within the European market.

FOSSA offers worldwide IoT satellite connectivity and satellite space services for industrial properties with their assets in outlying regions.

== Business ==
FOSSA Systems builds nanosatellites and microsatellites launched into Low-Earth Orbit (LEO). Their LEO satellites carry IoT receivers and other payloads, such as SDRs (Software Defined Radios), which can act as IoT cell phone towers from Space.

FOSSA System's satellites provide LoRa IoT (The Internet of Things) to remote areas without mobile coverage for low-wattage devices. These satellite communication services are commercialized by FOSSA as Software as a Service (SaaS) for IoT solutions or sold as dedicated satellites and ad-hoc projects.

The company's solution has applications in monitoring and tracking millions of assets in logistics, linear infrastructure, utilities, or agriculture in remote areas with connectivity issues or as a unified mass IoT system.

The company plans to deploy a constellation of 80 satellites by 2024 and has four more spacecraft scheduled for launch in 2023.

FOSSA also manufactures ground stations for operating their constellation and currently has two installed, one in La Linea, Spain, and one in Madrid, Spain. FOSSA satellites receive messages from Space through their sensors and send the gained information to the ground stations on Earth. The sensors and ground stations use LoRa Technology to communicate.

== History ==
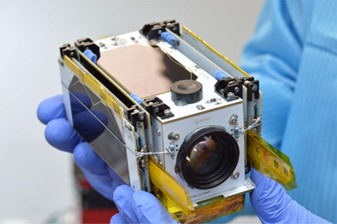
Fossa Systems 2022 PicoSatellite

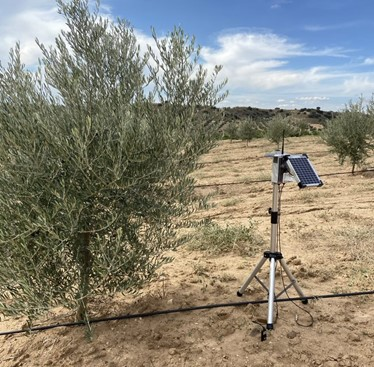
Fossa Systems Prototype Satellite. The IoT Node communicates as a gateway for smaller capacity sensors in space. It sends and receives IoT data to and from space.

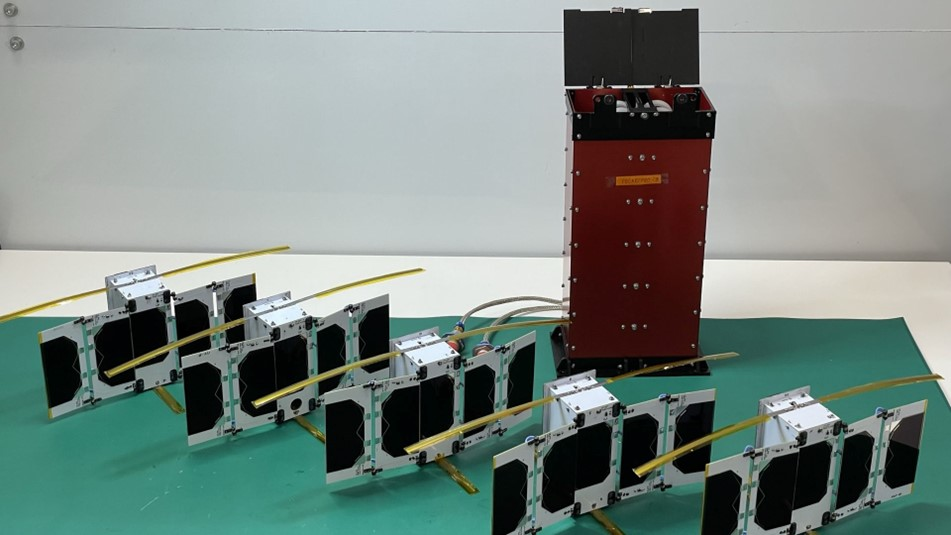
Fossa Systems PicoSatellites receive up to 400,000 messages per day.

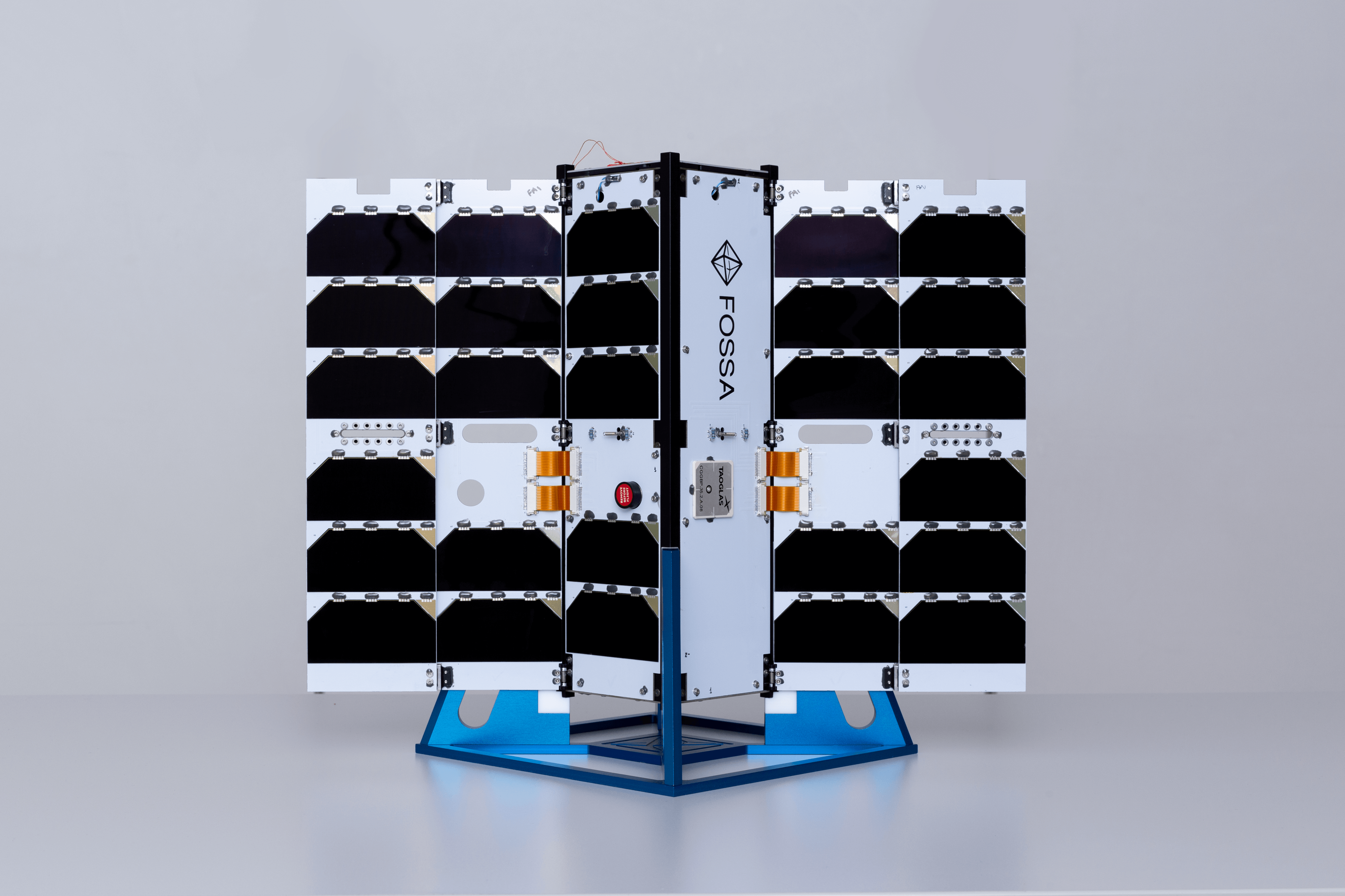
FOSSA 3U Satellite designed for IoT and SIGINT missions.

=== 2018-2019 ===
FOSSA Systems was initially founded as a non-profit project youth association in 2018 by 16-year-old Julián Fernandez to democratize access to space and the mass adoption of IoT. In 2019, they launched the first Spanish picosatellite FOSSASAT-1, which has a size of 5x5x5cm and a mass of 250g, to demonstrate their LoRa IoT Concept.

FOSSA Systems has made contributions to open-sourcing satellite software and hardware, which can be found on their GitHub.

=== 2020-2025 ===
Fossa Systems S.L. was officially founded in Spain on July 13, 2020, by Julián Fernández (CEO) and Vicente González (CTO). They noticed the need for a hardware manufacturer that provided remote IoT connectivity, so they created FOSSA Systems to offer affordable worldwide internet connections to those who need it. The company grew organically to six employees and €160,000 in sales before raising €765,000 in seed funding from their investors, WISeKey (a Swiss cybersecurity company), and Newmind Venture (A venture capital firm in Spain), in early 2021. The company has signed agreements to launch satellites for Platzi, WISeKey, and others since its foundation.

In 2021, the company closed its first financing round in 2021 with over 1M in revenue since its foundation.

FOSSA received a €318,000 NEOTEC project grant from the CDTI in 2022 to develop an earth-observation and IoT satellite platform.

In May 2023, FOSSA announced in partnership with WISeKey, it will be launching several new WISeSat-Ready FOSSA-powered satellites with SpaceX. These launches will add to the 13 FOSSA satellites currently in orbit. The satellites are set to be part of the 80-satellite constellation plan by FOSSA, with the goal of providing IoT connectivity in real time for industrial applications. The launch is set to be carried out by SpaceX on the Falcon 9 Vehicle in June 2023.

In 2024 the company raised a 6.3M EUR Series-A funding round led by Nabtesco Technology Ventures and Indico Capital Partners.

== FOSSASat constellation ==
FOSSA systems built the first Spanish picosatellite FOSSASat-1, launched in December 2019 aboard an Electron rocket. The satellite transmitted LoRa & RTTY messages to amateurs worldwide. In 2021, FOSSASat-1B and FOSSASat-2 were launched aboard a Firefly Alpha Rocket as part of the PICOBUS mission. The mission failed to reach orbit and was later successfully launched in 2022.

In January 2022, FOSSA launched six FOSSASat-2E satellites on board a Falcon-9 rocket to provide IoT services and other earth observation and edge-computing experiments. In May 2022, FOSSA launched seven PocketQubes called FOSSASat-2E x7, which are picosatellites that provide global IoT connectivity services. The seven satellites were on board a Momentus OTV (orbital transfer vehicle), amongst 52 others, flying on a Space X Falcon-9 ridesharing rocket. In 2022, FOSSA Systems was the European company to launch the most nanosatellites into space (satellites under 1 kg), totalling 13 through two SpaceX Transporter Missions.

In June 2023, FOSSA launched four FEROX satellites using a 6U form factor split into four sections aboard a SpaceX Falcon-9 mission (Transporter-8). In 2025 FOSSA Launched 3 3U nanosatellites aboard a Transporter-12 SpaceX Mission and later 1 3U nanosatellite aboard a Transporter-14. In July 2026, FOSSA-026 was launched on Transporter-17. In October 2026, FossaSat-2E27 was launched on Bandwagon-5.
