= Falcon 9 Block 5 =

Fifth version of the SpaceX medium-lift launch vehicle

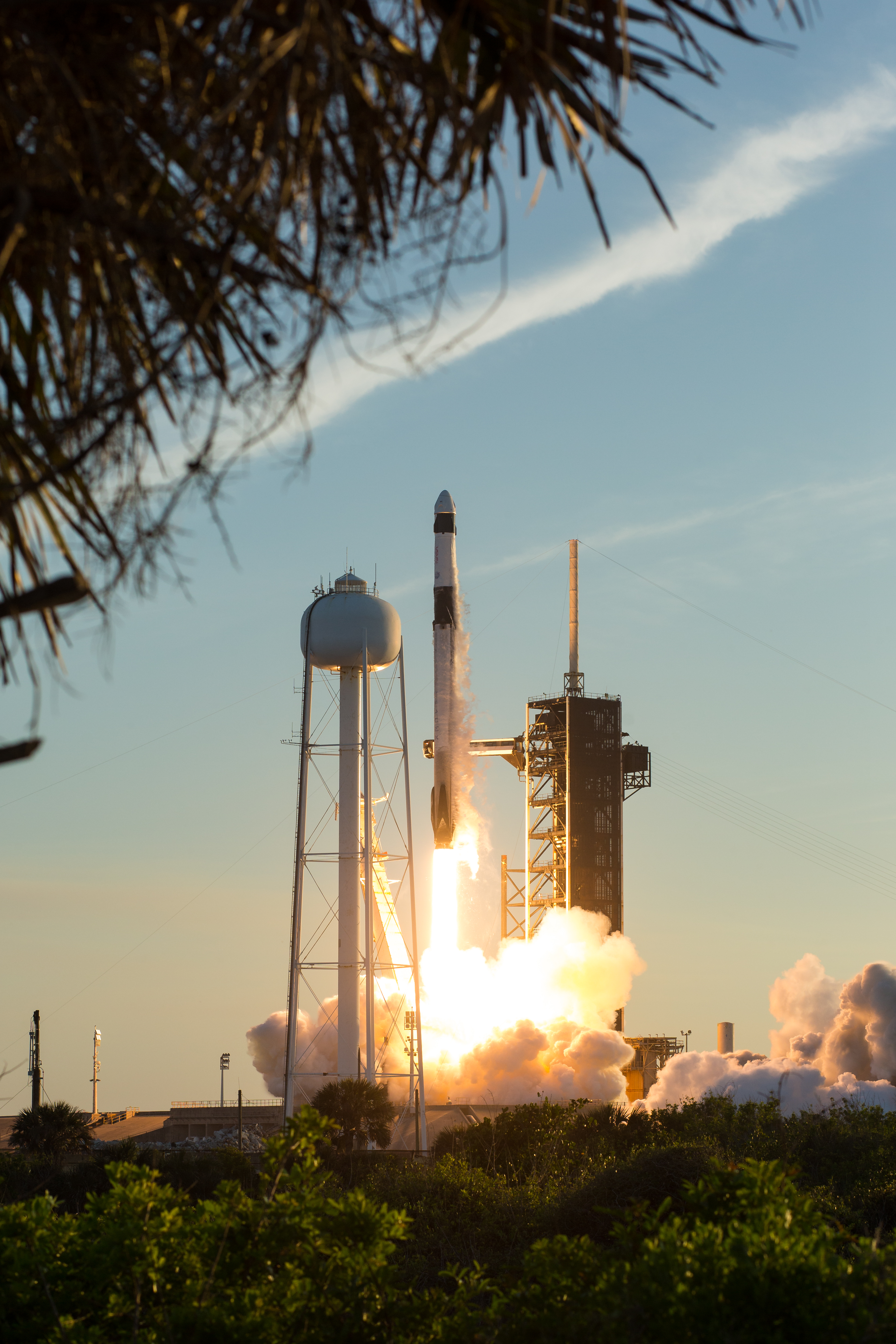
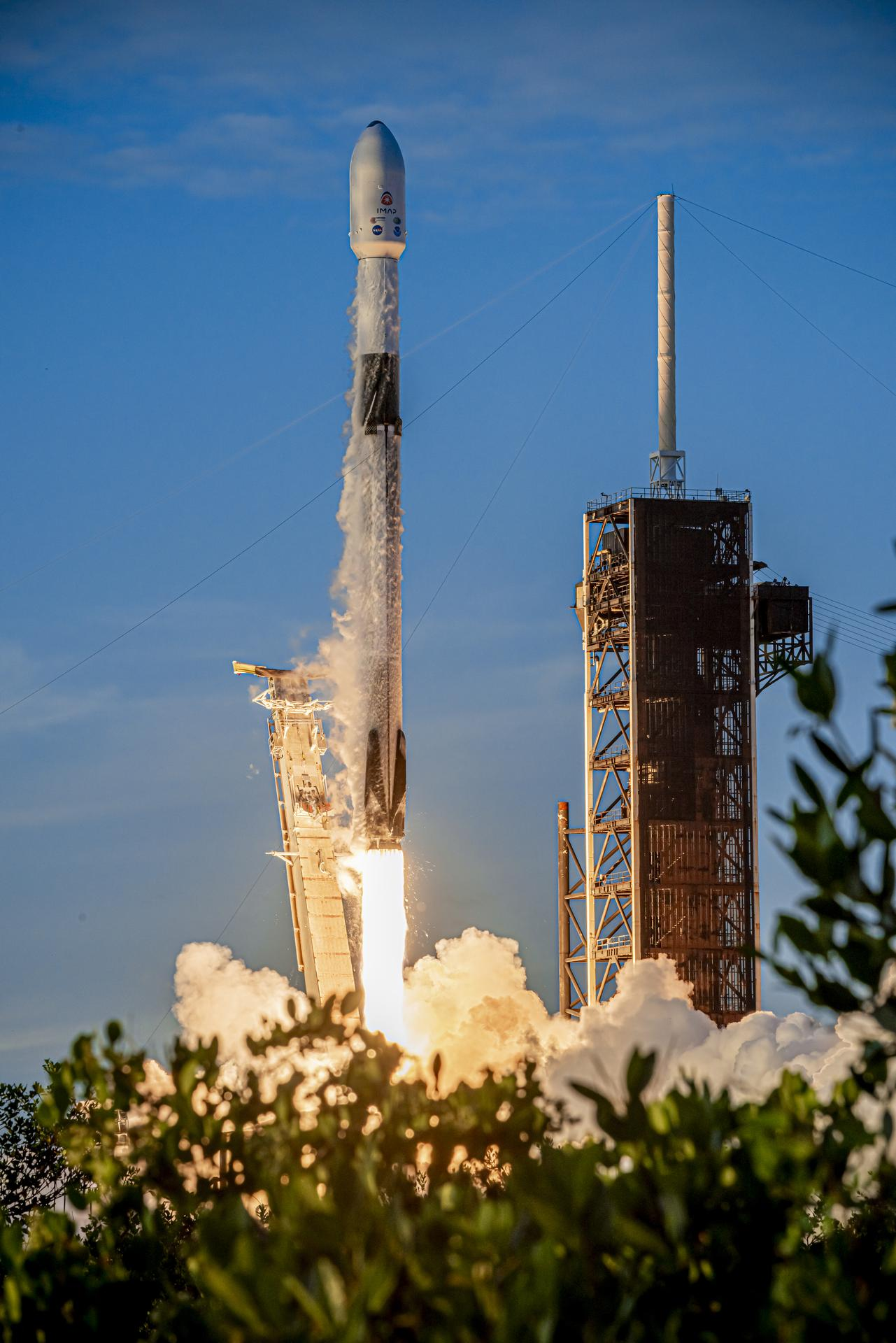
- Falcon 9 in its two configurations, with a Dragon 2 spacecraft (left) and payload fairing (right)
- Function: Medium-lift launch vehicle
- Manufacturer: SpaceX
- Country of origin: United States
- Cost per launch: US$69.75 million (2024)

Size
- Height: 69.8 m (229 ft) with payload fairing; 65.7 m (216 ft) with Dragon 2 (Note: 63.7 m (209 ft) with Dragon 1)
- Diameter: 3.7 m (12 ft)
- Mass: 549,000 kg (1,210,000 lb)
- Stages: 2

Capacity

Payload to LEO
- Orbital inclination: 28.5°
- Mass: Expended: 22,800 kg (50,300 lb); Reusable: 18,500 kg (40,800 lb)

Payload to GTO
- Orbital inclination: 27°
- Mass: Expended: 8,300 kg (18,300 lb); Reusable: 5,500 kg (12,100 lb)

Payload to TMI
- Mass: 4,000 kg (8,800 lb)

Associated rockets
- Family: Falcon 9
- Based on: Falcon 9 Full Thrust
- Comparable: Ariane 5; Atlas V; Long March 3B/E; Proton-M

Launch history
- Status: Active
- Launch sites: Cape Canaveral, SLC-40; Kennedy, LC-39A; Vandenberg, SLC-4 & SLC-6 (planned)
- Total launches: 644
- Success(es): 643
- Failure: 1 (Starlink Group 9‑3 (Note: Second stage engine disintegration))
- Landings: 648 / 654 attempts (Note: including use as side booster)
- First flight: May 11, 2018 (Bangabandhu-1)
- Last flight: October 31, 2026 (most recent)
- Carries passengers or cargo: SpaceX Dragon; Starlink; OneWeb; Iridium NEXT; Transporter & Bandwagon; DART; Euclid; Galileo; GPS Block IIIA; IXPE; KPLO; Nova-C; PACE; Hera; WorldView Legion; O3b mPOWER; SPHEREx; PUNCH; IMAP; CGO

First stage
- Height: 41.2 m (135 ft)
- Powered by: 9 × Merlin 1D
- Maximum thrust: 7,600 kN (1,700,000 lb_{f})
- Propellant: LOX / RP-1

Second stage (standard)
- Height: 13.8 m (45 ft 3 in)
- Powered by: 1 × Merlin 1D Vacuum
- Maximum thrust: 934 kN (210,000 lb_{f})
- Propellant: LOX / RP-1

Second stage (short nozzle)
- Height: 13.6 m (44 ft 7 in)
- Powered by: 1 × Merlin 1D Vacuum
- Maximum thrust: 840 kN (190,000 lb_{f})
- Propellant: LOX / RP-1

Falcon 9 Block 5 is a partially reusable, human-rated, two-stage-to-orbit, medium-lift launch vehicle (Note: If launched in expendable configuration, Falcon 9 has a theoretical payload capability of a heavy-lift launch vehicle) designed and manufactured in the United States by SpaceX. It is the fifth major version of the Falcon 9 family and the third version of the Falcon 9 Full Thrust. It is powered by Merlin 1D engines burning rocket-grade kerosene (RP-1) and liquid oxygen (LOX).

The main changes from Block 3 (the original Falcon 9 Full Thrust) to Block 5 are higher-thrust engines and improvements to the landing legs along with numerous other small changes to streamline recovery and re-use of first-stage boosters and fairing halves and increase the production rate. Each Block 5 booster is designed to fly ten times with only minor maintenance between launches and potentially up to 100 times with periodic refurbishment, while fairing halves have been recovered and reflown countless times.

In 2018, Block 5 succeeded the transitional Block 4 version. The maiden flight of the Block 5 launched the satellite Bangabandhu-1 on May 11, 2018. The CRS-15 mission on June 29, 2018, was the last to be launched on a Block 4 rocket, completing the transition to an all-Block 5 fleet.

== Overview ==
The Block 5 design changes are principally driven by upgrades needed for NASA's Commercial Crew program and National Security Space Launch requirements. They include performance upgrades, manufacturing improvements, and increase the margin for demanding customers.

In April 2017, SpaceX CEO Elon Musk said that Block 5 will feature 7–8% more thrust by uprating the engines (from 176,000 pounds-force (780,000 N) to 190,000 pounds-force (850,000 N) per engine). Block 5 includes an improved flight control system for an optimized angle of attack on the descent, lowering landing fuel requirements.

For reusability endurance:

- expected to be able to fly ten times with only minor maintenance between launches achieved in 2021
- potentially fly up to 100 times with periodic refurbishment
- a reusable heat shield protecting the engines and plumbing at the base of the rocket;
- more temperature-resistant cast and machined titanium grid fins;
- a thermal-protection coating on the first stage to limit reentry heating damage, including a black thermal protection layer on the landing legs, raceway, and interstage;
- redesigned and requalified more robust and longer life valves;
- redesigned composite overwrapped pressure vessels (COPV 2.0) for helium, to avoid oxygen freezing inside the structure of the tanks that lead to rupture.

For rapid reusability:

- reduced refurbishment between flights;
- a set of retractable landing legs for rapid recovery and shipping.
- the Octaweb structure is bolted together instead of welded, reducing manufacturing time.

== Improvements ==
Since the debut of Block 5, SpaceX has continued to iterate on its design, manufacturing processes, and operational procedures. Later Block 5 boosters are also easier to prepare for flight, so SpaceX "prefer to retire" older cores by assigning them to expendable missions when possible.

A pressure relief valve was added to the grid fins’ hydraulic system following a stall that resulted in a landing failure in 2018. Similarly, after a booster was damaged at sea in 2022, much of the fleet was upgraded with "self-leveling" landing legs. These legs help ensure the booster can be properly secured to the Octograbber, even in suboptimal sea states.

To improve the rocket's performance, SpaceX has tweaked throttle settings and separation timings.

=== COPV 2.0 ===
Initial Block 5 flights flew with the original COPV design and existing operational mitigations. COPV 2.0 tanks initially flew on the upper stage only, flying for the first time on the Es'hail 2 mission on November 15, 2018, and for a second time on the December 5, 2018 CRS-16 mission.

The first booster to feature COPV 2.0s was B1054, which launched GPS III SV01 on December 23, 2018. This was the first mission to fly COPV 2.0 on both stages.

=== Mission extension kits ===
SpaceX CRS-18 featured a Falcon mission-extension kit to the standard second stage, which equipped the second stage with a dark-painted band (for thermal control), extra COPVs for pressurization control, and additional TEA-TEB ignition fluid. The upgrades afforded the second stage with the endurance needed to inject the payloads directly into geosynchronous or high energy orbit where the second stage needs hours after launch. Based on mission requirements, they are Medium Coast & Long Coast kits, i.e., the number of helium bottles for pressurization and added batteries for power and other hardware to make sure that the fuel and stages systems operate as long as needed.

=== Short nozzle second stage ===
The Transporter-7 mission marked the debut of a second stage with a Merlin 1D Vacuum engine with a shorter nozzle extension designed to accelerate production and reduce costs. Unlike the first stage, the second stage on the Falcon 9 is not reused. This variant sacrifices 10% thrust in exchange for a 75% reduction in material usage, primarily the rare metal niobium. As a result, SpaceX can triple its launch frequency using the same amount of this critical resource. Due to its reduced performance, this nozzle is exclusively used on missions with lower performance requirements.

== Human rating ==
The NASA certification processes of the 2010s specified seven flights of any launch vehicle without major design changes before the vehicle would be NASA-certified for human spaceflight, and allowed to fly NASA astronauts.

The Block 5 design launched astronauts for the first time on May 30, 2020, on a NASA-contracted flight, Crew Dragon Demo-2. This was the first crewed orbital spaceflight launched from the United States since the final Space Shuttle mission in 2011, and the first ever operated by a commercial provider.

== Specifications ==
Specifications and characteristics are as follows:

Characteristic	First stage	Second stage
Height	42.6 m (140 ft)	12.6 m (41 ft)
Diameter	3.7 m (12 ft)	3.7 m (12 ft)
Empty mass (Note: without propellant)	22,200 kg (48,900 lb)	4,000 kg (8,800 lb)
Gross mass (Note: with propellant)	433,100 kg (954,800 lb)	111,500 kg (245,800 lb)
Structure type	LOX tank: monocoque Fuel tank: skin and stringer	LOX tank: monocoque Fuel tank: skin and stringer
Structure material	Aluminum lithium skin; aluminum domes	
Engines	9 × Merlin 1D	1 × Merlin 1D Vacuum
Engine type	Liquid, gas-generator	
Fuel	Kerosene (RP-1)	
Oxidizer	Subcooled liquid oxygen (LOX)	Liquid oxygen (LOX)
LOX tank capacity	287,400 kg (633,600 lb)	75,200 kg (165,800 lb)
RP-1 tank capacity	123,500 kg (272,300 lb)	32,300 kg (71,200 lb)
Engine nozzle	Gimbaled, 16:1 expansion	Gimbaled, 165:1 expansion
Total thrust	7,607 kN (1,710,000 lb_{f})	934 kN (210,000 lb_{f})
Propellant feed system	Turbopump	
Throttle capability	845–482 kN (190,000–108,300 lbf)	930–360 kN (210,000–81,000 lb_{f})
Restart capability	Yes (only 3 engines for boostback/reentry/landing burns)	Yes, dual redundant TEA-TEB pyrophoric igniters
Tank pressurization	Heated helium	
Ascent attitude control (pitch, yaw)	Gimbaled engines	Gimbaled engine and nitrogen gas thrusters
Ascent attitude control (roll)	Gimbaled engine	Nitrogen gas thrusters
Coast/descent attitude control	Nitrogen gas thrusters and grid fins	Nitrogen gas thrusters
Shutdown process	Commanded	

== Gallery ==
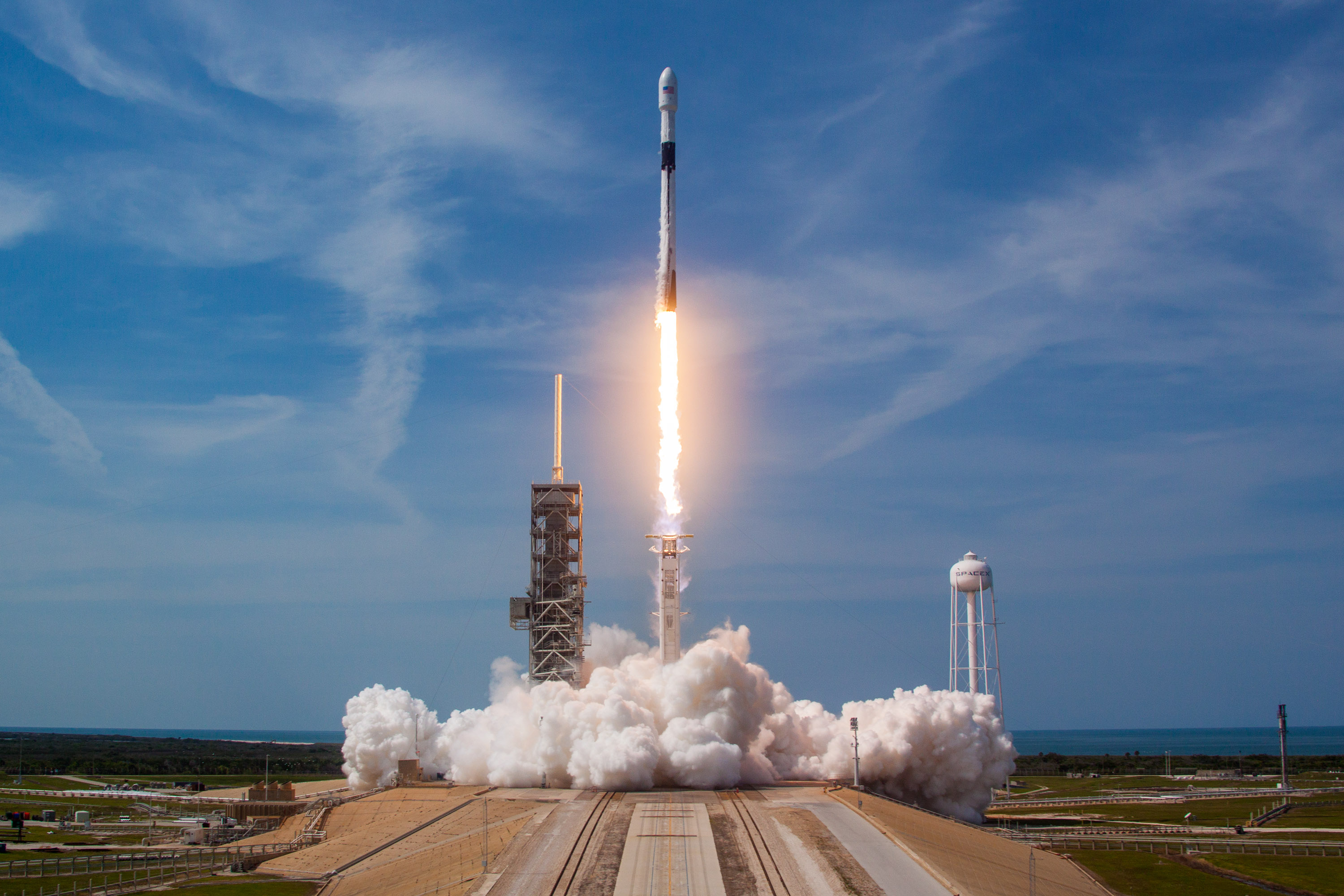
Bangladesh Satellite-1 was the first payload launched by Falcon 9 Block 5

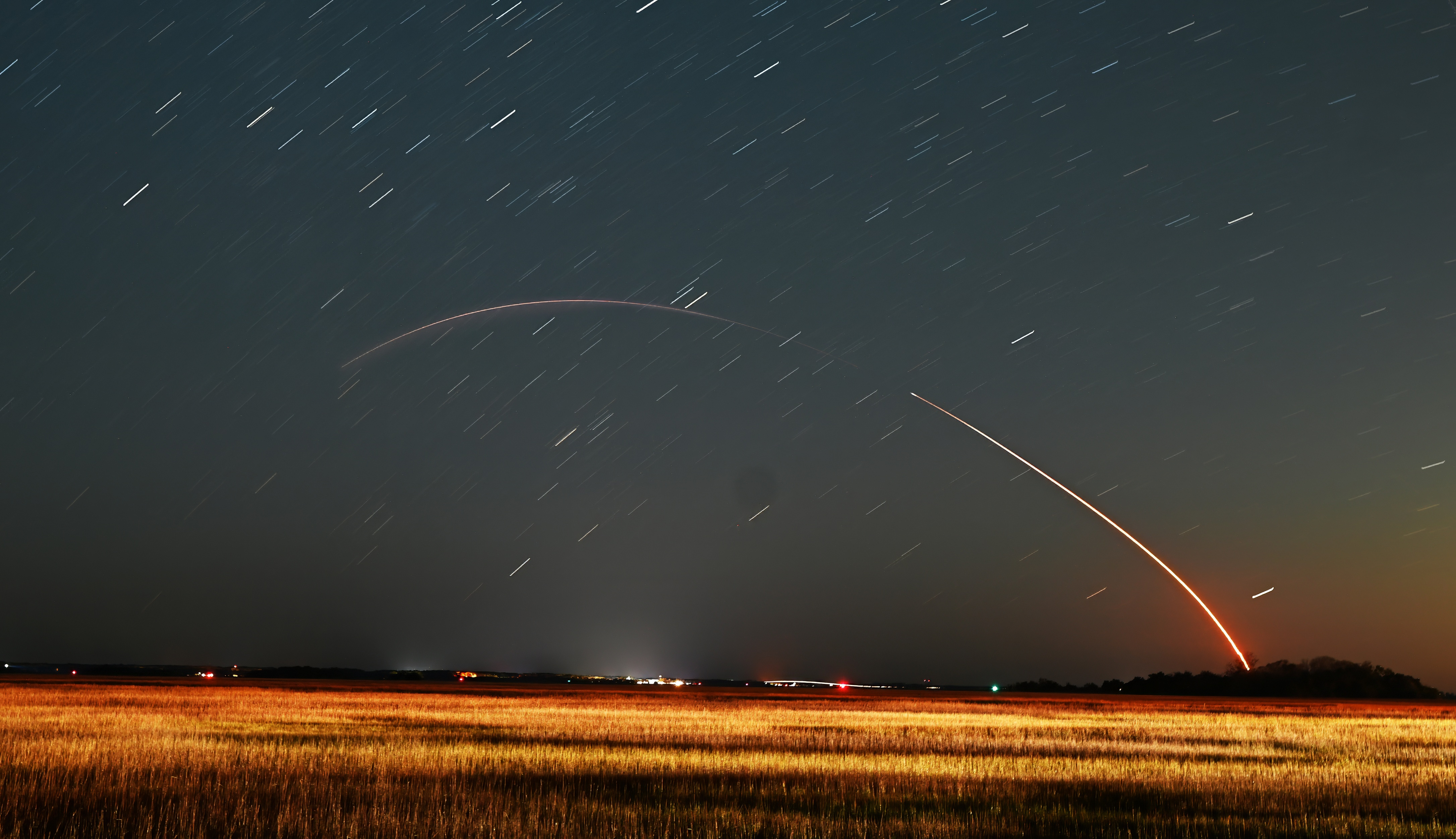
Time-lapse photo (243 seconds) of the launch on the night of December 18, 2023

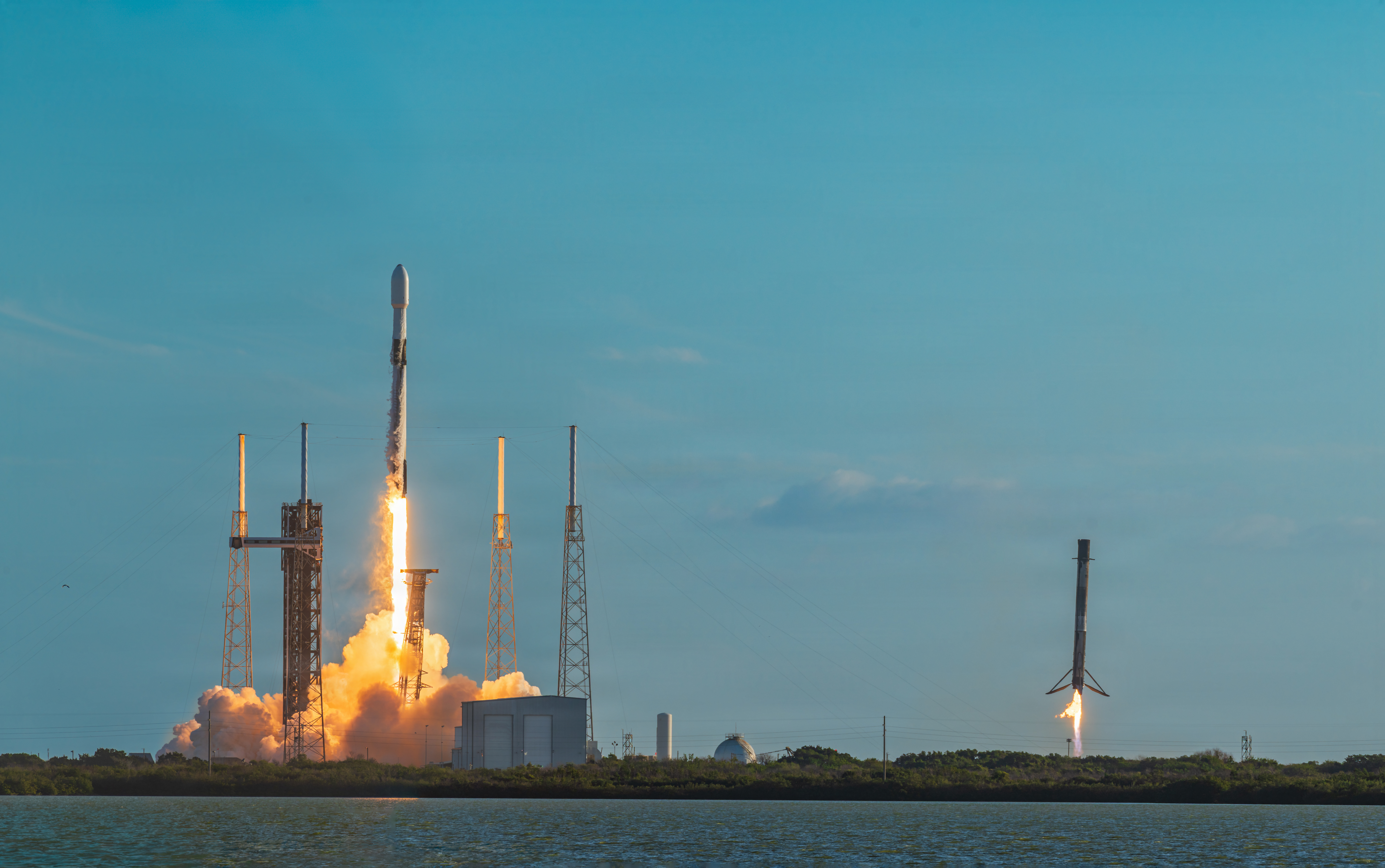
Composite image of NG-24 launch from SLC-40 and subsequent booster landing at LZ-40, capturing both events 8 minutes apart

== See also ==
- List of Falcon 9 and Falcon Heavy launches
- List of Falcon 9 Block 5 first-stage boosters
