= 2023 in spaceflight =

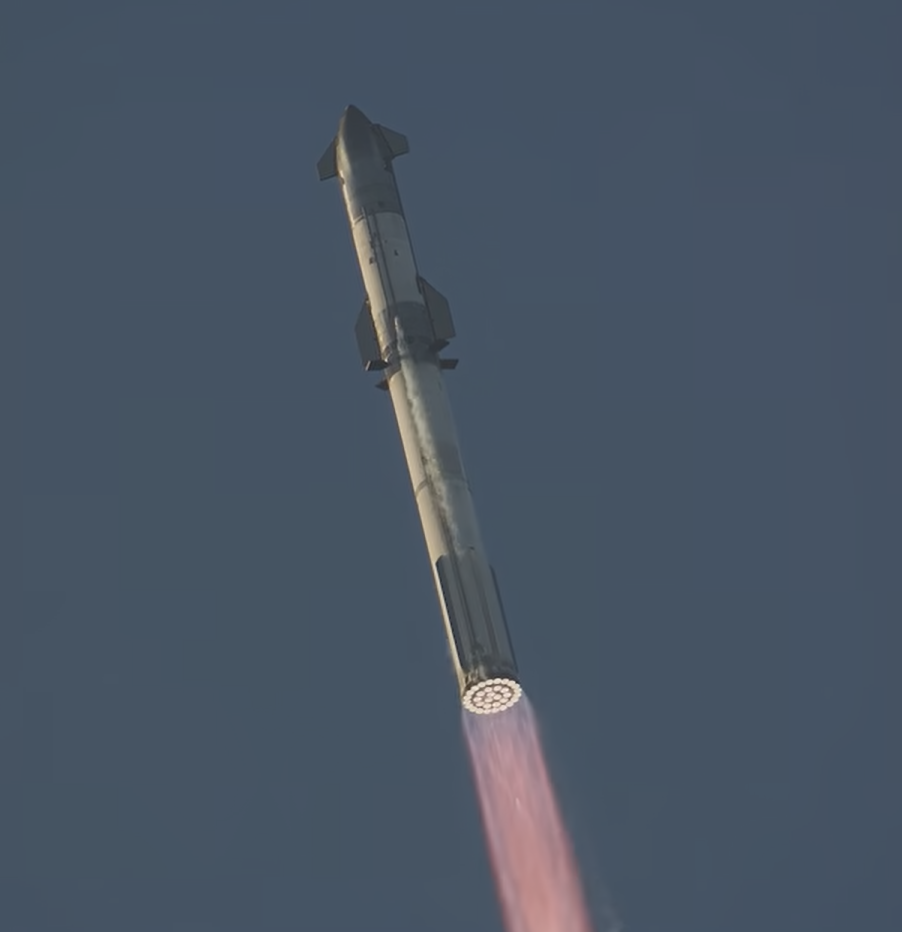
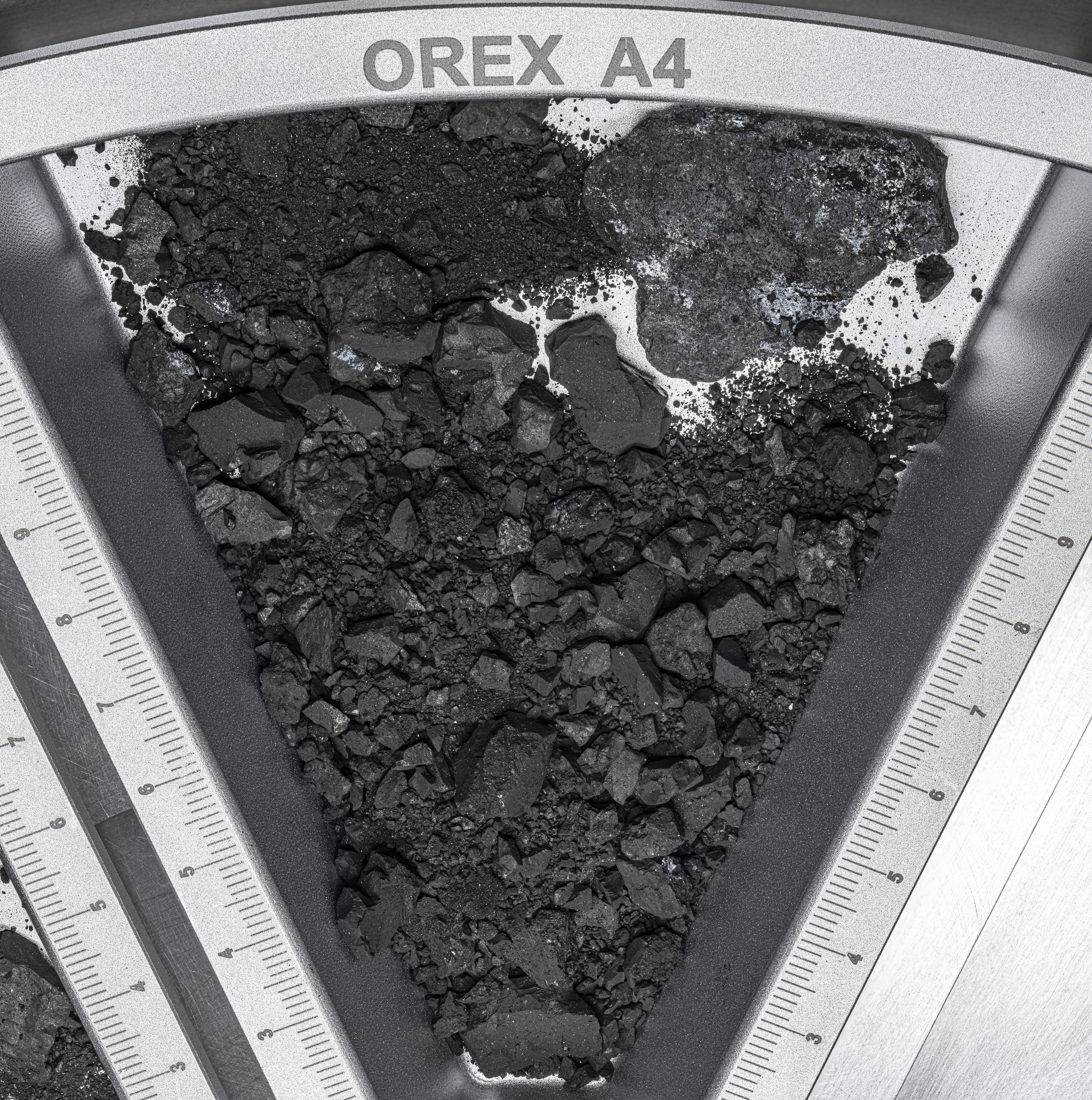
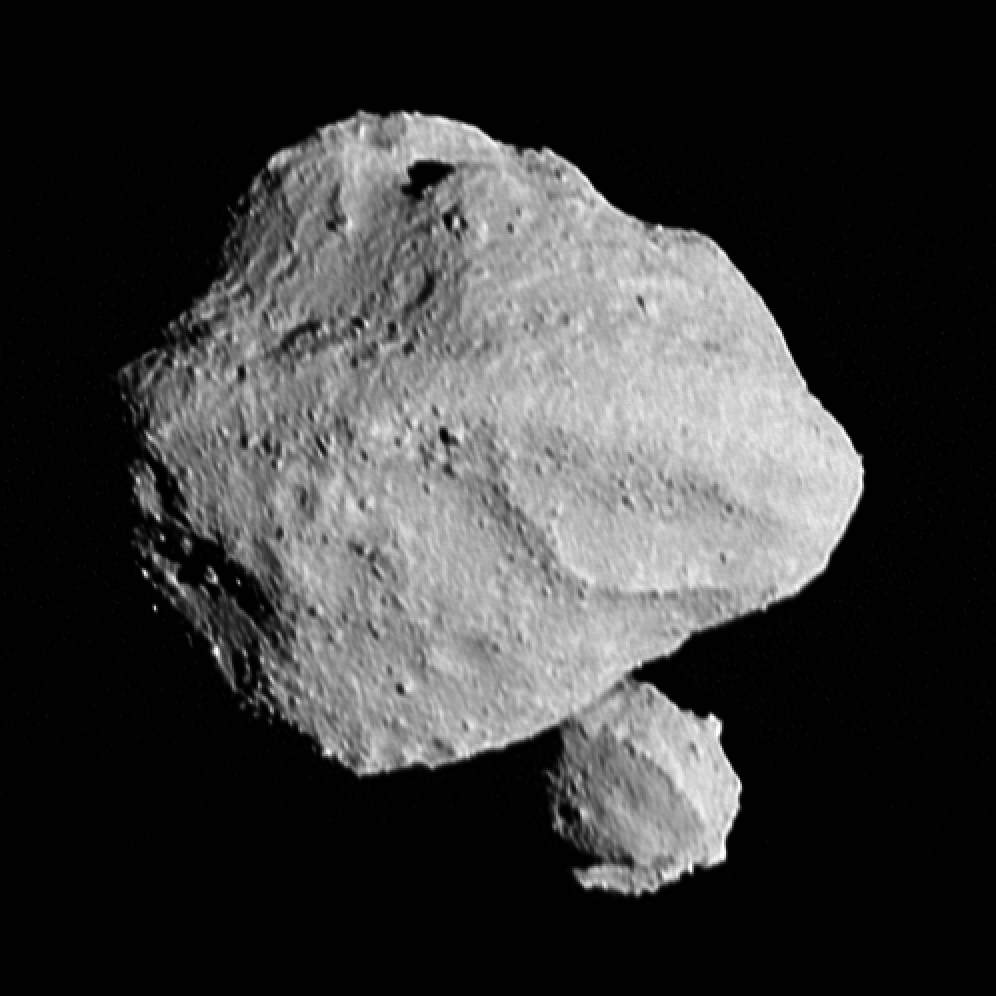
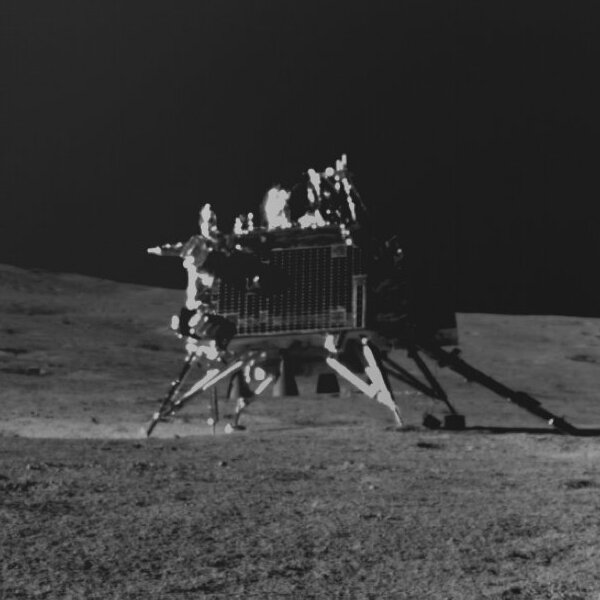
- Highlights from spaceflight in 2023 (Note: Clockwise from top: Starship, the most powerful rocket ever built, launched for the first and second time in 2023; Lucy flew past asteroid Dinkinesh, revealing its contact-binary moon Selam; Chandrayaan 3 landed on the lunar surface in August 2023, making India the fourth country to successfully do so; OSIRIS-REx returned samples from 101955 Bennu to Earth, completing a seven-year roundtrip journey)

Orbital launches
- First: 3 January
- Last: 30 December
- Total: 223
- Successes: 211
- Failures: 11
- Partial failures: 1
- Catalogued: 212

National firsts
- Spaceflight: Oman (suborbital spaceflight due to failed orbital launch)
- Satellite: Albania; Djibouti; Ireland; Oman; Vatican City; Macau
- Space traveller: Antigua and Barbuda; Pakistan

Rockets
- Maiden flights: Chŏllima 1; Ceres-1S; H3-22S; Qaem 100; RS1; SK solid fueled TV2; Starship Block 1; Terran 1; Tianlong-2
- Retirements: Antares 230+; Ariane 5; RS1; Atlas V 501; LauncherOne; Terran 1; Zhuque-2

Crewed flights
- Orbital: 6
- Orbital travellers: 21
- Suborbital: 5
- Suborbital travellers: 30
- Total travellers: 51

2023 in spaceflight

The year 2023 saw rapid growth and significant technical achievements in spaceflight. For the third year in a row, new world records were set for both orbital launch attempts (223) and successful orbital launches (211). The growth in orbital launch cadence can in large part be attributed to SpaceX, as they increased their number of launches from 61 in 2022 to 98 in 2023. The deployment of the Starlink satellite megaconstellation was a major contributing factor to this increase over previous years. This year also featured numerous maiden launches of new launch vehicles. In particular, SSLV, Qaem 100, Tianlong-2, Chollima-1, and Zhuque-2 performed their first successful orbital launch, while SpaceX's Starship – the world's largest rocket – launched two times during its development stage: IFT-1 and IFT-2.

In terms of national-level scientific space missions, ISRO successfully soft-landed Chandrayaan-3 on the Moon, Roscosmos's Luna 25 failed to land on the Moon, NASA's OSIRIS-REx returned an asteroid sample from 101955 Bennu back to Earth and NASA's Lucy probe performed a flyby of asteroid 152830 Dinkinesh. This year also saw the launch of ESA's Jupiter Icy Moons Explorer probe, JAXA's XRISM space telescope, JAXA's SLIM lunar lander, and NASA's Psyche asteroid probe.

Two crewed space stations, the International Space Station (ISS) and Tiangong, were in operation in 2023. In terms of crewed missions, the ISS saw Expedition 68, 69, and 70, while Tiangong saw Shenzhou 15, 16, and 17. The ISS also briefly hosted crews of Axiom Mission 2, a private spaceflight mission. Notably, because Soyuz MS-22 was afflicted by a coolant leak, Soyuz MS-23 was launched as a replacement crew return vehicle.

This year also saw the first time citizens of Antigua and Barbuda and Pakistan crossed the 50 mi (80 km) altitude mark, which is the United States's definition of outer space. They did so in a suborbital launch organized by Virgin Galactic, however, they did not managed to cross the Kármán line (100 km or 62 mi). Albania, Djibouti, Ireland, Oman and Vatican City (on behalf of Italy) have their own satellite in orbit for the first time in 2023.

== Overview ==
=== Astronomy and Astrophysics ===
European Space Agency's (ESA) Euclid satellite was launched towards Sun-Earth L2 point by a Falcon 9 rocket on 1 July. The satellite observes distant galaxies to study dark matter and dark energy.

ISRO launched Aditya-L1 to study the Sun on 2 September.

JAXA launched XRISM (X-Ray Imaging and Spectroscopy Mission) X-ray space telescope and SLIM lunar lander on 6 September.

=== Exploration of the Solar System ===
On 14 April, ESA launched the Jupiter Icy Moons Explorer (JUICE) spacecraft to explore Jupiter and its large ice-covered moons following an eight-year transit.

The OSIRIS-REx mission returned to Earth on 24 September with samples collected from asteroid Bennu.

NASA launched the Psyche spacecraft on 13 October 2023, an orbiter mission that will explore the origin of planetary cores by studying the metallic asteroid 16 Psyche, on a Falcon Heavy launch vehicle.

On 1 November, NASA's Lucy probe performed a flyby of asteroid 152830 Dinkinesh, revealing it to be a binary pair.

=== Lunar exploration ===
ISRO launched its third lunar mission Chandrayaan-3 on 14 July 2023 at 9:05 UTC; it consisted of lander, rover and a propulsion module, and successfully landed in the south pole region of the Moon on 23 August 2023. For technology demonstration experiments, hop experiment on the Vikram Lander was conducted and the Propulsion Module (PM) of Chandrayaan-3 was moved from an orbit around Moon to an orbit around Earth, where it operated until 22 August 2024.

Russian lunar lander Luna 25 was launched on 10 August 2023, 23:10 UTC, atop a Soyuz-2.1b rocket from the Vostochny Cosmodrome. It is the first Russian attempt to land a spacecraft on the Moon since the Soviet lander Luna 24 in 1974. It crashed on the Moon on 19 August after technical glitches.

JAXA launched SLIM (Smart Lander for Investigating Moon) lunar lander (carrying two mini rovers) and a space telescope (XRISM) on 6 September. SLIM entered orbit around the Moon on 25 December (UTC).

=== Human spaceflight ===
A new record for the number of people in space at the same time, though not necessarily all in orbit, was reached on 25 May 2023. 20 people were in space simultaneously, with eleven people aboard the ISS, three on Tiangong, and six on VSS Unity. Five days later on 30 May, the record for the number of people in orbit simultaneously was broken as well, with 17 people in orbit at once; 6 people on Tiangong from Shenzhou 15 and 16, 7 people from Expedition 69 on the ISS as well 4 crew members from Axiom-2 also on the ISS.

==== Private Human Spaceflight and Tourism ====
Axiom Mission 2 private crew mission to the International Space Station was launched on 21 May 2023 on a SpaceX Falcon 9. The mission ended with the successful return of the crew to Earth on 31 May 2023.

Virgin Galactic Unity 25 mission took place 25 May 2023. This was the first mission for Virgin Galactic's suborbital spaceplane VSS Unity since 2021. On 29 June 2023, Virgin Galactic flew their first commercial suborbital spaceflight mission, Galactic 01, with their suborbital spaceplane VSS Unity. Onboard Unity were three employees of the company and three passengers (whose flight had been paid from outside the company) from the Italian Air Force and Italy's National Research Council. On 10 August Virgin Galactic flew their Galactic 02 mission, the first VSS Unity flight carrying a space tourist. Galactic 03 mission flew on 8 September, followed by Galactic 04 on 6 October and Galactic 05 on 2 November 2023. All of these crewed suborbital missions were flown by Unity.

=== Rocket innovation ===
On 10 January, ABL Space Systems' RS1 had its debut flight, but failed to reach orbit.

On 10 February, SSLV rocket developed by ISRO had its first successful orbital launch.

On 4 March, IRGC's Qaem 100 performed its orbital maiden flight following a successful suborbital test flight in 2022. However the vehicle, which was carrying the Nahid-1 satellite, failed to put the payload in orbit.

On 7 March, JAXA/MHI H3's maiden flight was terminated in-flight due to failure to ignite the second stage, resulting in the loss of the ALOS-3 land observation satellite.

On 23 March, Relativity Space's Terran 1 had its debut flight. The flight goal, which was to demonstrate the viability of 3D printing for major structural components of a rocket, was achieved when Terran 1 passed max q and continued to perform nominally. However, after stage separation, the second stage failed to ignite, ending the mission. Following the failed launch, Relativity retired the rocket in favor of developing the much larger, reusable Terran R vehicle.

On 2 April, Space Pioneer's Tianlong-2 had its debut flight, and successfully reached orbit. It was the first successful launch of a Chinese privately-funded liquid-fueled rocket. Space Pioneer is the first private company to reach orbit on its first attempt using a fully liquid fueled rocket.

On 20 April, SpaceX's Starship had its first test flight, aiming to complete about three-quarters of an orbit and landing in the Pacific Ocean northwest of Kauai. Several engines on the booster failed during the flight and the flight termination system was triggered, ending the flight before stage separation.

On 22 April, Evolution Space completed its first suborbital space flight test with the Gold Chain Cowboy solid-fueled rocket.

On 30 May, the North Korean Chollima-1 made its first orbital launch attempt, carrying the military reconnaissance satellite Malligyong-1. However, the launch failed to achieve orbit when the second stage ignited too early in the mission. The launch vehicle crashed into the Yellow Sea.

On 12 July, LandSpace's Zhuque-2 rocket, in its second flight, became the world's first methane-fuelled rocket to successfully reach orbit.

On 5 September, the sea-launched version of the Ceres-1 launch vehicle, designated Ceres-1S, made its successful debut.

On 15 September, Firefly's Alpha rocket made its successful flight for a tactically responsive mission for the U.S. Space Force.

On 18 November 2023, SpaceX Starship attempted its second flight test, becoming the heaviest rocket to enter space, although the first stage exploded shortly after separation, while the second stage was lost nearly eight minutes after launch. In the same month, they completed the construction of crew access tower at CCSFS SLC-40 launch pad, where they completed 50 launches alone on that launch pad. They also completed 250th Falcon booster landing.

=== Satellite technology ===
On 27 January, ESA reported the successful demonstration of a braking sail-based satellite deorbiter, ADEO, which could be used by space debris mitigation measures.

In April, Chinese media first reported on tests of flexible organic solar cells on balloons in the 35 km stratosphere.

On 29 July a Falcon Heavy rocket launched the Jupiter-3 (EchoStar-24) communications satellite to geosynchronous orbit. With a mass of over 9 tonnes, EchoStar's Jupiter-3 is the heaviest geostationary satellite ever launched.

On 1 June, Caltech reported the first successful demonstration of solar energy from space via its SSPD-1 spacecraft.

== Orbital launches ==
List of orbital launches
| Month | Num. of successes | Num. of failures | Num. of partial failures |
|---|---|---|---|
| January | 14 | 2 | 0 |
| February | 12 | 0 | 0 |
| March | 22 | 3 | 0 |
| April | 11 | 1 | 0 |
| May | 19 | 1 | 0 |
| June | 13 | 0 | 0 |
| July | 18 | 0 | 0 |
| August | 21 | 1 | 0 |
| September | 21 | 2 | 0 |
| October | 17 | 0 | 0 |
| November | 15 | 1 | 0 |
| December | 28 | 0 | 1 |
| Total | 211 | 11 | 1 |

== Deep-space rendezvous ==
| Date (UTC) | Spacecraft | Event | Remarks |
|---|---|---|---|
| 17 March | Parker Solar Probe | 15th perihelion | Success |
| 21 March | Hakuto-R Mission 1 | Lunar orbit insertion | Success |
| 25 April | Hakuto-R Mission 1 | Lunar landing | Communications were lost, landing failed. |
| 19 June | BepiColombo | Third gravity assist at Mercury | Success |
| 22 June | Parker Solar Probe | 16th perihelion | Success |
| 31 July | Juno | 53rd perijove | On this perijove Juno flew by Io at a distance of 22,000 km. |
| 5 August | Chandrayaan-3 | Lunar orbit insertion | Success |
| 16 August | Luna 25 | Lunar orbit insertion | Success |
| 19 August | Luna 25 | Lunar landing | Communications were lost, crashed onto the Moon's surface. |
| 21 August | Parker Solar Probe | Sixth gravity assist at Venus | Success |
| 23 August | Chandrayaan-3 | Lunar landing | Success |
| 24 September | OSIRIS-REx | Sample return to Earth and gravity assist at Earth | Success |
| 27 September | Parker Solar Probe | 18th perihelion | Success |
| 4 October | SLIM | Flyby of the Moon | Part of the spacecraft's approach to lunar orbit via a Weak stability boundary like trajectory |
| Between 13 October and 10 November | Chandrayaan-3 | 4 Lunar flybys on Earth return | Success |
| 1 November | Lucy | Flyby of 152830 Dinkinesh | The spacecraft flew by the asteroid at a distance of 425 km. |
| 25 December | SLIM | Lunar orbit insertion | Success |
| 29 December | Parker Solar Probe | 18th perihelion | Success |
| 30 December | Juno | 57th perijove | On the day of this perijove, Juno flew by Io at a distance of 1,500 km. Orbital period around Jupiter reduced to 35 days. |

== Extravehicular activities (EVAs) ==
| Start date/time | Duration | End time | Spacecraft | Crew | Remarks |
|---|---|---|---|---|---|
| 20 January 2023; 13:14 | 7 hours 21 minutes | 20:35 | Expedition 68; ISS Quest | (Japan) Koichi Wakata (United States) Nicole Mann | First spacewalk of 2023 to finish installation of the IROSA mounting brackets on the starboard side of the station. Wakata and Mann installed cables on the 1B Array at the S6 truss, which was not completed on the last spacewalk, tightened bolts and installed a terminator on a cable along with its connected jumper on the SSDCDC converter box to isolate the 1B array until the IROSA solar arrays are installed following the arrival of SpaceX CRS-28 in June. They also assembled and installed the IROSA mounting bracket onto the 1A array, which was also left incomplete on the last spacewalk. Wakata and Mann were unable to secure the final strut on the 1A solar array because of debris in the guide track of the mounting pad and only one of the jumpers was installed. The astronauts returned the strut to the Quest Airlock and will use special tools to clean the tracks before it is remounted on the next spacewalk. They were also unable to connect the cables for 1A due to time constraints. NASA astronaut Zena Cardman was Ground IV, assisted by JAXA astronaut Akihiko Hoshide, who was the Capcom for the astronauts inside the ISS during the spacewalk. |
| 2 February 2023; 12:45 | 6 hours 41 minutes | 19:26 | Expedition 68; ISS Quest | (United States) Nicole Mann (Japan) Koichi Wakata | Final spacewalk to install the mounting brackets for the 1A solar array in preparation for the delivery of IROSA on SpaceX CRS-28. Tasks included installing the final strut, securing the bolts on the 1A solar array, relocating foot restraints that were left on P6 inboard, and routing cables. NASA astronaut Zena Cardman was Ground IV. |
| 9 February 2023; 9:10 | 7 hours 6 minutes | 16:16 | Shenzhou 15; TSS Wentian airlock | (China) Fei Junlong (China) Zhang Lu | They completed a series of tasks, including installing the fourth external pump (Z01-04) on the Mengtian lab module and other tasks related to Mengtian's payload airlock, which allows astronauts to deploy science payloads and small satellites using the station's robotic arms. After successfully completing the installation and commissioning of the extended pump set in the Mengtian experimental cabin, Fei Junlong needs to transfer to the core cabin of Tianhe, remove the foot stopper in the tool box outside the node, and then return to the Mengtian experimental cabin, and install it in the designated location for the second time out of the cabin to install large equipment. For the first time, Fei Junlong held a large-scale foot stopper and an external operating platform to carry out a large-scale transfer, which put forward higher requirements for the safety of the task. It is China's longest spacewalk to date. |
| 2 March 2023 ??:?? | ? hours ? minutes | ??:?? | Shenzhou 15 TSS Wentian airlock | (China) Fei Junlong (China) Zhang Lu | Fei Junlong and Zhang Lu went out of the cabin again to perform tasks such as the installation of external equipment on the space station. After leaving the cabin, Fei Junlong and Zhang Lu first autonomously transferred to the operating point with the help of the handrail outside the cabin. During the crawling process, Fei Junlong had to take off the two safety rope hooks of the previous handrail and hang them on the next handrail every time he moved a handrail. Repeatedly picking and hanging the hooks was a small challenge and not good for the strength of the astronaut's upper limbs. The equipment that Fei Junlong and Zhang Lu are going to install for the second time out of the cabin has about 20 plugs, and these plugs have protective covers. When installing, you need to pull out the protective covers before inserting the plugs. Do a power test. Other tasks were to dump trash bags during spacewalk. |
| 30 March 2023 ??:?? | ? hours ? minutes | ??:?? | Shenzhou 15 TSS Wentian airlock | (China) Fei Junlong (China) Zhang Lu | Fei Junlong and Zhang Lu partnered again to perform the third out-of-cabin activity and complete the task of installing and connecting cables across the cabin. There are more than 40 plugs at both ends of the cross-cabin cable, and the work intensity and difficulty are greater than last time. Fei Junlong and Zhang Lu successfully completed this mission in a way that they had not trained before. Other tasks were to dump trash bags during spacewalk. |
| 15 April 2023 ??:?? | ? hours ? minutes | ??:?? | Shenzhou 15 TSS Wentian airlock | (China) Fei Junlong (China) Zhang Lu | During the fourth spacewalk, the three astronauts of the Shenzhou 15 crew worked closely together inside and outside the cabin, and successfully completed the installation of the fifth extended pump (Z02-01) set outside the Mengtian, the installation and connection of cross-cabin cables, and the external load exposure platform. The installation of support rods and other tasks laid the foundation for the subsequent large-scale extravehicular science and technology experiments. Other tasks were to dump trash bags during spacewalk. |
| 19 April; 01:40 | 7 hours 55 minutes | 09:35 | Expedition 69 ISS Poisk | (Russia) Sergey Prokopyev (Russia) Dmitry Petelin | Ninth in a series of spacewalks to outfit Nauka and to prepare ERA for operations. The spacewalkers used ERA to pick up the radiator with the arm where it was relocated at the end of the spacewalk. They closed valves on the nitrogen jumpers, removed covers over the nitrogen jumpers, disconnected the radiator heater cable and capped it, removed bolts and launch restraints, and transferred the radiator over to Nauka and installed it into a socket on the forward face where it will be deployed at the end of EVA 4. As part of get-ahead tasks, they will prepare the airlock for transfer to Nauka on the next spacewalk and stowed the ERA adapter on the airlock. Because of time and issues with matting the radiator the task to jettison the covers was moved to the next spacewalk. This was the longest spacewalk of this expedition and a critical one to get the lab activated. |
| 28 April; 13:11 | 7 hours 1 minute | 20:12 | Expedition 68; ISS Quest | (United States) Stephen Bowen (United Arab Emirates) Sultan Al Neyadi | Bowen and Al Neyadi, who became the first Arab astronaut to perform a spacewalk, finished routing cables and secured the struts with MLI at the 1B and 1A solar arrays in preparation for the arrival of the IROSA arrays in June. The primary task to retrieve the Space to Ground Antenna (SASA) was deferred to the next spacewalk because a stuck bolt on the electronics box prevented the antenna from being released from the FRAM. NASA Astronaut Anne McClain was Ground IV CAPCOM. |
| 4 May; 20:00 | 7 hours 11 minutes | 03:11 | Expedition 69 ISS Poisk | (Russia) Sergey Prokopyev (Russia) Dmitry Petelin | Tenth in a series of spacewalks to outfit Nauka and to prepare ERA for operations. The spacewalkers removed bolts, removed covers, disconnected cables, and used ERA to transfer the airlock over to Nauka where it was installed on the forward facing port. Once the airlock was installed they mated cables and jettisoned their trash which included hardware and covers from the previous spacewalks and this spacewalk. Spacewalk faced a delay when ERA entered an uncontrolled roll placing the airlock out of alignment. Prokopyev and Petelin improvised with a little elbow grease and got the airlock rotated into the correct position and got it latched in place. Spacewalk faced another delay when tape was found on the electrical connectors requiring Prokopyev to cut it before the cables were connected. |
| 12 May; 15:47 | 5 hours 14 minutes | 23:01 | Expedition 69 ISS Poisk | (Russia) Sergey Prokopyev (Russia) Dmitry Petelin | Eleventh and final spacewalk to outfit Nauka and to prepare ERA for operations. To wrap up work on Nauka, the cosmonauts deployed the radiator, and installed nitrogen and ammonia jumpers to cool the Russian Segment and connected the radiator to electrical power, hydraulics, and mechanical connections. As a getahead task while the radiator was being filled with coolant the cosmonauts installed gap spanners on ERA's boom to allow for translation on future spacewalks. |
| 9 June; 13:15 | 6 hours 3 minutes | 19:18 | Expedition 69; ISS Quest | (United States) Stephen Bowen (United States) Woody Hoburg | NASA astronauts Steve Bowen and Woody Hoburg exited the station's Quest airlock and installed an upgraded IROSA (International Space Station Roll-Out Solar Array) on the 1A power channel on the starboard truss of the station. Task included removing bolts, deploying the rollers, and installing cables before the solar array was picked up by Hoburg with assistance from Canadarm 2 and installed on the 1A solar array on the S4 Truss. The array was deployed at 16:32 hours and is receiving power. |
| 15 June; 12:42 | 5 hours 35 minutes | 18:17 | Expedition 69; ISS Quest | (United States) Stephen Bowen (United States) Woody Hoburg | NASA astronauts Steve Bowen and Woody Hoburg exited the station's Quest airlock to install the final upgraded IROSA (International Space Station Roll-Out Solar Array) on the 1B power channel on the starboard truss of the station. Task included removing bolts, deploying the rollers, and installing cables before the solar array was picked up by Hoburg with assistance from Canadarm 2 and installed on the 1B solar array on the S6 Truss. The array was deployed at 16:51 hours and is receiving power. As part of getahead task they covered the cables in MLI and secured the struts, relocated their foot restraints inboard, and stowed the support beams on the flight support structure for disposal. |
| 22 June; 14:24 | 6 hours 24 minutes | 20:48 | Expedition 69 ISS Poisk | (Russia) Sergey Prokopyev (Russia) Dmitry Petelin | Prokopyev and Petelin exited the Poisk airlock and routed an Ethernet cable to the port experiment frame on the Zvezda Service Module, jettisoned experiment hardware including the TMTC Monoblock antennas, the highspeed data transmission antenna, and the Seismo Prognos payload, installed a data transmission radio onto the port frame, removed experiments from the Zvezda Service Module, photographed Zvezda including the thrusters so they can patch the leak, inspected an antenna, and retrieved the Biorisk containers. As a getahead they cleaned the windows on the Russian segment, reposition the Plume Measurement Unit, and jettisoned a towel. |
| 20 July 2023; 05:45 | 7 hours 55 minutes | 13:40 | Shenzhou 16; TSS Wentian airlock | (China) Jing Haipeng (China) Zhu Yangzhu | They installed & lifted the bracket for panoramic camera B of core module, unlocked & lifted panoramic camera A/B of Mengtian lab module. Zhu Yangzhu became first Chinese flight engineer to conduct an extravehicular activity. |
| 9 August; 14:44 | 6 hours 35 minutes | 21:19 | Expedition 69 ISS Poisk | (Russia) Sergey Prokopyev (Russia) Dmitry Petelin | Twelfth and final spacewalk to outfit Nauka and to prepare ERA for operations. Both cosmonauts ventured outside the station's Poisk Airlock to attach three debris shields to the Rassvet module. They also tested the sturdiness of the last MLM outfitting called the ERA portable workpost, that will be affixed to the end of the European robotic arm attached to the Nauka multipurpose laboratory module. |
| 25 October; 17:49 | 7 hours 41 minutes | 01:30 (next day) | Expedition 70 ISS Poisk | (Russia) Oleg Kononenko (Russia) Nikolai Chub | The cosmonauts ventured outside and installed a mini radar experiment on Nauka, launched a CubeSat which will test solar sails, and photographed the RTOd radiator and closed valves to isolate the radiator and vented residual coolant so plans can be done to fix a leaking cooling line that delayed two US spacewalks. During one of the vents, Kononenko got sprayed and the coolant got on one of his tethers. The tether was placed in a trash bag and stowed externally to decontaminate it, while Kononenko's suit was wiped down to prevent coolant from entering the station. During the radar deployment, one of the hinges got stuck. The cosmonauts will go out on the next spacewalk with a pole and lock the hinges so it can be deployed. During the satellite deployment, the telescoping booms did not come out and ground controllers are working to manually deploy them so the satellite can track the sun. |
| 1 November 2023; 12:05 | 6 hours 42 minutes | 18:47 | Expedition 70; ISS Quest | (United States) Jasmin Moghbeli (United States) Loral O'Hara | Moghbeli and O'Hara ventured outside and removed an H fixture from the 3B mass canister on the P4 truss in preparation for the arrival of the struts and the IROSA solar arrays in 2025. They also replaced a damaged Trundle Bearing under Cover 2 which had been giving them trouble in the past and greased the tracks before the new Trundle Bearing was installed on the port SARJ, secured a cable on Camera 8 which was shorting out a light used for dockings, and released wedge clamps on the SASA antenna. The primary task to retrieve the SASA antenna from ESP2 so it can be returned to Earth on SpaceX CRS-29 was moved to the next spacewalk because of issues removing the covers from the SARJ. O'Hara was not secured properly during the removal and had to be assisted by Moghbeli to get the cover stowed. During the spacewalk, the bag containing the grease gun was lost, but the tools were not needed and the bag posed no collision risk to the station. This was the fourth all-female spacewalk on the station, following Christina Koch and Jessica Meir's three spacewalks during Expedition 61. |
| 21 December 2023; 6:10 | 7 hours 25 minutes | 13:35 | Shenzhou 17; TSS Wentian airlock | (China) Tang Hongbo (China) Tang Shengjie | Tasks included a repair test of the Tianhe core module's solar panels, which have sustained minor damage caused by impacts of space debris and micrometeoroids. |

== Space debris events ==
| Date/Time (UTC) | Source object | Event type | Pieces tracked | Remarks |
|---|---|---|---|---|
| 4 January | (Russia) Kosmos 2499 | Breakup | 85 | Energetic fragmentation event; Cause Unknown |
| 11 March | (United States) Orbcomm F36 | Breakup | 7 | Unknown; likely energetic fragmentation event caused by a malfunction in the hydrazine orbit adjust system |
| 29 June | (Soviet Union) Kosmos 2143 (Strela-3) | Breakup | 6 | Unknown; likely energetic fragmentation caused by battery overpressure. Six fragments alongside the primary vehicle. |
| 21 August | (Italy) Vega VV02 VESPA adapter | Breakup | 7 | Unknown; likely debris impact |

== Orbital launch statistics ==
=== By country ===
For the purposes of this section, the yearly tally of orbital launches by country assigns each flight to the country of origin of the rocket, not to the launch services provider or the spaceport.

| Country | Launches | Successes | Failures | Partial failures |
|---|---|---|---|---|
| China | 67 | 66 | 1 | 0 |
| France | 2 | 2 | 0 | 0 |
| India | 7 | 7 | 0 | 0 |
| Iran | 2 | 1 | 1 | 0 |
| Israel | 1 | 1 | 0 | 0 |
| Italy | 1 | 1 | 0 | 0 |
| Japan | 3 | 2 | 1 | 0 |
| North Korea | 3 | 1 | 2 | 0 |
| Russia | 19 | 19 | 0 | 0 |
| South Korea | 2 | 2 | 0 | 0 |
| United States | 116 (Note: Includes Electron launches from Māhia) | 109 | 6 | 1 |
| World | 223 | 211 | 11 | 1 |

=== By rocket ===
- Ceres-1
- Chŏllima 1
- Electron
- Falcon 9 new
- Falcon 9 reused
- Falcon Heavy
- H-IIA
- H3
- Kuaizhou-1A
- Long March 2
- Long March 3
- Long March 4
- Long March 5
- Long March 6
- Long March 7
- Long March 11
- PSLV
- Soyuz-2
- Soyuz-2-1v
- Alpha
- Ariane 5
- Atlas V
- Hyperbola-1
- LVM 3
- Proton-M
- Starship
- Zhuque-2
- Others

==== By family ====
| Family | Country | Launches | Successes | Failures | Partial failures | Remarks |
|---|---|---|---|---|---|---|
| Alpha | United States | 2 | 1 | 0 | 1 | |
| Antares | United States | 1 | 1 | 0 | 0 | |
| Ariane | France | 2 | 2 | 0 | 0 | |
| Atlas | United States | 2 | 2 | 0 | 0 | |
| Ceres | China | 7 | 6 | 1 | 0 | |
| Chŏllima | North Korea | 3 | 1 | 2 | 0 | Maiden flight |
| Delta | United States | 1 | 1 | 0 | 0 | |
| Electron | United States | 9 | 8 | 1 | 0 | |
| Falcon | United States | 96 | 96 | 0 | 0 | |
| GSLV | India | 1 | 1 | 0 | 0 | |
| H-series | Japan | 3 | 2 | 1 | 0 | |
| Hyperbola | China | 2 | 2 | 0 | 0 | |
| Jielong | China | 1 | 1 | 0 | 0 | |
| Kinetika | China | 1 | 1 | 0 | 0 | |
| Kuaizhou | China | 6 | 6 | 0 | 0 | |
| LauncherOne | United States | 1 | 0 | 1 | 0 | Final flight |
| Long March | China | 47 | 47 | 0 | 0 | |
| LVM 3 | India | 2 | 2 | 0 | 0 | |
| Nuri | South Korea | 1 | 1 | 0 | 0 | |
| PSLV | India | 3 | 3 | 0 | 0 | |
| Qaem | Iran | 1 | 0 | 1 | 0 | Maiden flight |
| RS1 | United States | 1 | 0 | 1 | 0 | Maiden flight |
| R-7 | Russia | 17 | 17 | 0 | 0 | |
| Safir | Iran | 1 | 1 | 0 | 0 | |
| Shavit | Israel | 1 | 1 | 0 | 0 | |
| SK solid fueled LV | South Korea | 1 | 1 | 0 | 0 | Maiden flight |
| SSLV | India | 1 | 1 | 0 | 0 | |
| Starship | United States | 2 | 0 | 2 | 0 | Maiden flight |
| Terran | United States | 1 | 0 | 1 | 0 | Maiden flight |
| Tianlong | China | 1 | 1 | 0 | 0 | Maiden flight |
| UR | Russia | 2 | 2 | 0 | 0 | |
| Vega | Italy | 1 | 1 | 0 | 0 | |
| Zhuque | China | 2 | 2 | 0 | 0 | |

==== By type ====
| Rocket | Country | Family | Launches | Successes | Failures | Partial failures | Remarks |
|---|---|---|---|---|---|---|---|
| Alpha | United States | Alpha | 2 | 1 | 0 | 1 | |
| Antares | United States | Antares | 1 | 1 | 0 | 0 | |
| Ariane 5 | France | Ariane | 2 | 2 | 0 | 0 | Final flight |
| Atlas V | United States | Atlas | 2 | 2 | 0 | 0 | |
| Ceres-1 | China | Ceres | 7 | 6 | 1 | 0 | |
| Chŏllima 1 | North Korea | Chŏllima | 3 | 1 | 2 | 0 | Maiden flight |
| Delta IV | United States | Delta | 1 | 1 | 0 | 0 | |
| Electron | United States | Electron | 9 | 8 | 1 | 0 | |
| Falcon 9 | United States | Falcon | 96 | 96 | 0 | 0 | |
| GSLV | India | GSLV | 1 | 1 | 0 | 0 | |
| H-IIA | Japan | H-series | 2 | 2 | 0 | 0 | |
| H3 | Japan | H-series | 1 | 0 | 1 | 0 | Maiden flight |
| Hyperbola-1 | China | Hyperbola | 2 | 2 | 0 | 0 | |
| Jielong 3 | China | Jielong | 1 | 1 | 0 | 0 | |
| Kinetika 1 | China | Kinetika | 1 | 1 | 0 | 0 | |
| Kuaizhou-1 | China | Kuaizhou | 6 | 6 | 0 | 0 | |
| LauncherOne | United States | LauncherOne | 1 | 0 | 1 | 0 | Final flight |
| Long March 2 | China | Long March | 25 | 25 | 0 | 0 | |
| Long March 3 | China | Long March | 6 | 6 | 0 | 0 | |
| Long March 4 | China | Long March | 7 | 7 | 0 | 0 | |
| Long March 5 | China | Long March | 1 | 1 | 0 | 0 | |
| Long March 6 | China | Long March | 3 | 3 | 0 | 0 | |
| Long March 7 | China | Long March | 3 | 3 | 0 | 0 | |
| Long March 11 | China | Long March | 2 | 2 | 0 | 0 | |
| LVM 3 | India | LVM 3 | 2 | 2 | 0 | 0 | |
| Nuri | South Korea | Nuri | 1 | 1 | 0 | 0 | |
| PSLV | India | PSLV | 3 | 3 | 0 | 0 | |
| Proton | Russia | UR | 2 | 2 | 0 | 0 | |
| Qaem 100 | Iran | Qaem | 1 | 0 | 1 | 0 | Maiden flight |
| Qased | Iran | Safir | 1 | 1 | 0 | 0 | |
| RS1 | United States | RS1 | 1 | 0 | 1 | 0 | Maiden flight |
| Shavit 2 | Israel | Shavit | 1 | 1 | 0 | 0 | |
| SSLV | India | SSLV | 1 | 1 | 0 | 0 | |
| SK solid fueled TV | South Korea | SK solid fueled LV | 1 | 1 | 0 | 0 | Maiden flight |
| Soyuz-2 | Russia | R-7 | 17 | 17 | 0 | 0 | |
| Starship | United States | Starship | 2 | 0 | 2 | 0 | Maiden flight |
| Terran 1 | United States | Terran | 1 | 0 | 1 | 0 | Only flight |
| Tianlong-2 | China | Tianlong | 1 | 1 | 0 | 0 | Maiden flight |
| Vega | Italy | Vega | 1 | 1 | 0 | 0 | |
| Zhuque-2 | China | Zhuque | 2 | 2 | 0 | 0 | |

==== By configuration ====
| Rocket | Country | Type | Launches | Successes | Failures | Partial failures | Remarks |
|---|---|---|---|---|---|---|---|
| Alpha | United States | Alpha | 2 | 1 | 0 | 1 | |
| Antares 230+ | United States | Antares | 1 | 1 | 0 | 0 | Final flight |
| Ariane 5 ECA | France | Ariane 5 | 2 | 2 | 0 | 0 | Final flight |
| Atlas V 501 | United States | Atlas V | 1 | 1 | 0 | 0 | Final flight |
| Atlas V 551 | United States | Atlas V | 1 | 1 | 0 | 0 | |
| Ceres-1 | China | Ceres-1 | 6 | 5 | 1 | 0 | |
| Ceres-1S | China | Ceres-1 | 1 | 1 | 0 | 0 | Maiden flight |
| Chŏllima 1 | North Korea | Chŏllima 1 | 3 | 1 | 2 | 0 | Maiden flight |
| Delta IV Heavy | United States | Delta IV | 1 | 1 | 0 | 0 | |
| Electron | United States | Electron | 9 | 8 | 1 | 0 | |
| Falcon 9 Block 5 | United States | Falcon 9 | 91 | 91 | 0 | 0 | |
| Falcon Heavy | United States | Falcon 9 | 5 | 5 | 0 | 0 | |
| GSLV Mk II | India | GSLV | 1 | 1 | 0 | 0 | |
| H-IIA 202 | Japan | H-IIA | 2 | 2 | 0 | 0 | |
| H3-22S | Japan | H3 | 1 | 0 | 1 | 0 | Maiden flight |
| Hyperbola-1 | China | Hyperbola-1 | 2 | 2 | 0 | 0 | |
| Jielong 3 | China | Jielong 3 | 1 | 1 | 0 | 0 | |
| Kinetika 1 | China | Kinetika 1 | 1 | 1 | 0 | 0 | |
| Kuaizhou-1A | China | Kuaizhou-1 | 6 | 6 | 0 | 0 | |
| LauncherOne | United States | LauncherOne | 1 | 0 | 1 | 0 | Final flight |
| Long March 2C | China | Long March 2 | 6 | 6 | 0 | 0 | |
| Long March 2C / YZ-1S | China | Long March 2 | 3 | 3 | 0 | 0 | |
| Long March 2D | China | Long March 2 | 12 | 12 | 0 | 0 | |
| Long March 2D / YZ-3 | China | Long March 2 | 1 | 1 | 0 | 0 | Maiden flight |
| Long March 2F/G | China | Long March 2 | 2 | 2 | 0 | 0 | |
| Long March 2F/T | China | Long March 2 | 1 | 1 | 0 | 0 | |
| Long March 3B/E | China | Long March 3 | 5 | 5 | 0 | 0 | |
| Long March 3B/E / YZ-1 | China | Long March 3 | 1 | 1 | 0 | 0 | |
| Long March 4B | China | Long March 4 | 1 | 1 | 0 | 0 | |
| Long March 4C | China | Long March 4 | 6 | 6 | 0 | 0 | |
| Long March 5 | China | Long March 5 | 1 | 1 | 0 | 0 | |
| Long March 6 | China | Long March 6 | 1 | 1 | 0 | 0 | |
| Long March 6A | China | Long March 6 | 2 | 2 | 0 | 0 | |
| Long March 7 | China | Long March 7 | 1 | 1 | 0 | 0 | |
| Long March 7A | China | Long March 7 | 2 | 2 | 0 | 0 | |
| Long March 11 | China | Long March 11 | 2 | 2 | 0 | 0 | |
| LVM 3 | India | LVM 3 | 2 | 2 | 0 | 0 | |
| Nuri | South Korea | Nuri | 1 | 1 | 0 | 0 | |
| PSLV-CA | India | PSLV | 2 | 2 | 0 | 0 | |
| PSLV-XL | India | PSLV | 1 | 1 | 0 | 0 | |
| Proton-M / DM-03 | Russia | Proton | 1 | 1 | 0 | 0 | |
| Proton-M / Briz-M | Russia | Proton | 1 | 1 | 0 | 0 | |
| Qaem 100 | Iran | Qaem 100 | 1 | 0 | 1 | 0 | Maiden flight |
| Qased | Iran | Qased | 1 | 1 | 0 | 0 | |
| RS1 | United States | RS1 | 1 | 0 | 1 | 0 | Maiden flight |
| Shavit 2 | Israel | Shavit 2 | 1 | 1 | 0 | 0 | |
| SSLV | India | SSLV | 1 | 1 | 0 | 0 | |
| SK solid fueled TV2 | South Korea | SK solid fueled TV | 1 | 1 | 0 | 0 | Maiden flight |
| Soyuz-2.1a | Russia | Soyuz-2 | 8 | 8 | 0 | 0 | |
| Soyuz-2.1a / Fregat-M | Russia | Soyuz-2 | 1 | 1 | 0 | 0 | |
| Soyuz-2.1b | Russia | Soyuz-2 | 2 | 2 | 0 | 0 | |
| Soyuz-2.1b / Fregat-M | Russia | Soyuz-2 | 4 | 4 | 0 | 0 | |
| Soyuz-2-1v | Russia | Soyuz-2 | 2 | 2 | 0 | 0 | |
| Starship Block 1 | United States | Starship | 2 | 0 | 2 | 0 | Maiden flight |
| Terran 1 | United States | Terran 1 | 1 | 0 | 1 | 0 | Only flight |
| Tianlong-2 | China | Tianlong-2 | 1 | 1 | 0 | 0 | Maiden flight |
| Vega | Italy | Vega | 1 | 1 | 0 | 0 | |
| Zhuque-2 | China | Zhuque-2 | 2 | 2 | 0 | 0 | Final flight |

=== By spaceport ===
- Jiuquan
- South China Sea
- Taiyuan
- Wenchang
- Xichang
- Yellow Sea
- Kourou
- Satish Dhawan
- Shahroud
- Palmachim
- Tanegashima
- Baikonur
- Mahia
- Sohae
- Plesetsk
- Vostochny
- Naro
- Jeju
- Cornwall
- Cape Canaveral
- Kennedy
- MARS
- PSCA
- Starbase
- Vandenberg

| Site | Country | Launches | Successes | Failures | Partial failures | Remarks |
|---|---|---|---|---|---|---|
| Baikonur | Kazakhstan | 9 | 9 | 0 | 0 | |
| Cape Canaveral | United States | 59 | 58 | 1 | 0 | |
| Cornwall | United Kingdom | 1 | 0 | 1 | 0 | First launch |
| Jeju | South Korea | 1 | 1 | 0 | 0 | First launch |
| Jiuquan | China | 36 | 35 | 1 | 0 | |
| Kennedy | United States | 13 | 13 | 0 | 0 | |
| Kourou | France | 3 | 3 | 0 | 0 | |
| Mahia | New Zealand | 7 | 6 | 1 | 0 | |
| MARS | United States | 3 | 3 | 0 | 0 | |
| Naro | South Korea | 1 | 1 | 0 | 0 | |
| PSCA | United States | 1 | 0 | 1 | 0 | |
| Palmachim | Israel | 1 | 1 | 0 | 0 | |
| Plesetsk | Russia | 7 | 7 | 0 | 0 | |
| Satish Dhawan | India | 7 | 7 | 0 | 0 | |
| Shahroud | Iran | 2 | 1 | 1 | 0 | |
| Sohae | North Korea | 3 | 1 | 2 | 0 | |
| South China Sea | China | 2 | 2 | 0 | 0 | |
| Starbase | United States | 2 | 0 | 2 | 0 | First orbital launch |
| Taiyuan | China | 9 | 9 | 0 | 0 | |
| Tanegashima | Japan | 3 | 2 | 1 | 0 | |
| Vandenberg | United States | 30 | 29 | 0 | 1 | |
| Vostochny | Russia | 3 | 3 | 0 | 0 | |
| Wenchang | China | 4 | 4 | 0 | 0 | |
| Xichang | China | 15 | 15 | 0 | 0 | |
| Yellow Sea | China | 1 | 1 | 0 | 0 | |
| Total | | 223 | 211 | 11 | 1 | |

=== By orbit ===
- Low Earth
- Low Earth (ISS)
- Low Earth (CSS)
- Low Earth (SSO)
- Low Earth (retrograde)
- Medium Earth
- Molniya
- Geosynchronous
- Tundra
- Lunar transfer
- High Earth Orbit
- Heliocentric

| Orbital regime | Launches | Achieved | Not achieved | Accidentally achieved | Remarks |
|---|---|---|---|---|---|
| Transatmospheric | 2 | 0 | 2 | 0 | |
| Low Earth / Sun-synchronous | 185 | 176 | 9 | 0 | Including flights to ISS and Tiangong (CSS) |
| Geosynchronous / Tundra / GTO | 25 | 25 | 0 | 0 | |
| Medium Earth / Molniya | 6 | 6 | 0 | 0 | |
| High Earth / Lunar transfer | 2 | 2 | 0 | 0 | |
| Heliocentric orbit / Planetary transfer | 3 | 3 | 0 | 0 | |
| Total | 223 | 212 | 11 | 0 | |

== Suborbital launch statistics ==
=== By country ===
For the purposes of this section, the yearly tally of suborbital launches by country assigns each flight to the country of origin of the rocket, not to the launch services provider or the spaceport. Flights intended to fly below 80 km (50 mi) are omitted.

| Country | Launches | Successes | Failures | Partial failures |
|---|---|---|---|---|
| Brazil | 3 | 3 | 0 | 0 |
| Canada | 7 | 6 | 1 | 0 |
| China | 2 | 2 | 0 | 0 |
| France | 2 | 2 | 0 | 0 |
| Germany | 1 | 0 | 1 | 0 |
| Iran | 2 | 2 | 0 | 0 |
| Israel | 1 | 1 | 0 | 0 |
| Japan | 1 | 1 | 0 | 0 |
| North Korea | 7 | 7 | 0 | 0 |
| Pakistan | 3 | 2 | 1 | 0 |
| Russia | 5 | 4 | 1 | 0 |
| South Korea | 1 | 1 | 0 | 0 |
| Turkey | 1 | 1 | 0 | 0 |
| United States | 39 | 35 | 4 | 0 |
| Yemen | 1 | 1 | 0 | 0 |
| World | 76 | 68 | 8 | 0 |
