= Salman (rocket motor) =

Rocket engine developed by Iran

Salman upper-stage
- Manufacturer: IRGCASF
- Country of origin: Iran
- Used on: Qased; Qaem-100

General characteristics
- Diameter: 1 m (3 ft 3 in)
- Gross mass: 1,900 kg (4,200 lb)

Associated stages
- Comparable: Star 48, Castor 30

Launch history
- Status: Active
- Total launches: 5
- Successes (stage only): 5
- Failed: 0
- First flight: 22 April 2020

Salman upper-stage
- Burn time: 60 seconds
- Propellant: Solid

The Salman (Persian: سلمان) is a solid-propellant rocket motor designed and built by the Islamic Revolutionary Guard Corps. It is used as the second stage of the Qased and Qaem-100 satellite launch vehicles. The system was announced on 9 February 2020 and was launched for the first time on 22 April 2020, placing Iran's first military satellite, named Noor, into orbit.

== Design ==
Salman weighs 1,900 kilograms, has a diameter of 1 meter, and fires for 60 seconds. In contrast to previous Iranian commercial and military rocket designs, Salman has a wound carbon-fiber composite casing rather than the traditional steel motor casings typical of other Iranian designs, this drastically reduces weight and improves performance, allowing for more payload capacity.

Another break with past Iranian designs is the first ever use of gimballed thrust vector control (TVC) for steering as opposed to aerodynamic control surfaces, jet vanes, or vernier thrusters previously used. A steerable nozzle provides several advantages to Salman as opposed to other methods that result in its superior performance and efficiency; as opposed to jet vanes, no thrust is lost in a gimballed system when steering; control surfaces only work in endo-atmospheric flight and cannot be used for injecting satellites or atmospheric re-entry; vernier thrusters and their associated piping, turbopumps and tanks are heavy and their omission could make way for a larger payload.

== Launch history ==
Flight No.	Date	Rocket	Payload	Outcome	Remarks
1	22 April 2020	Qased	Noor 1	Success	Iran's first military reconnaissance satellite
2	8 March 2022	Qased	Noor 2	Success	
3	5 November 2022	Qaem-100	Unknown	Success	Suborbital test flight
4	4 March 2023	Qaem-100	Nahid-1	Failure	
5	27 September 2023	Qased	Noor 3	Success	
6	20 January 2024	Qaem-100	Soraya	Success	
7	14 September 2024	Qaem-100	Chamran-1	Success	

== See also ==
- Qased (rocket)
- Qaem-100 (rocket)
- IRGC Aerospace Force
- Noor (satellite)
- List of upper-stages
- Iranian Space Agency
