= List of rocket stages =

Rocket upper stages are optimized for operation at the edge of space.

== Upper stages ==
bold denotes active configurations
italics denotes configurations in development

Name	Country	Flown on	Proposed for	Status	Remarks
Advanced Cryogenic Evolved Stage	United States		Vulcan	Development paused	
Agena	United States	Atlas, Thor, Thorad, Titan IIIB		Retired	
AVUM	(European Union) ESA/Italy	Vega, **Vega C**		In service	
Gamma-2	United Kingdom	Black Arrow		Retired	
Blok D	Soviet Union; Russia	N1, Proton, Proton-K		Retired	
Blok DM-03	Russia	**Proton-M**	Angara A5	In service	
Blok DM-SL	Soviet Union; Russia	**Zenit-3SL**		In service	
Briz-KM	Russia	**Rokot**	Angara 1.2	In service	
Briz-M	Russia	Proton-K, **Proton-M**, **Angara A5**		In service	
Castor 30	United States	**Antares**		In service	
Centaur	United States	Atlas, Atlas G, Atlas I, Atlas II, Atlas III, **Atlas V**, Titan IIIE, Titan IV, **Vulcan**		In service	
CTS	China	**Long March 2C**		In service	
Delta Cryogenic Second Stage	United States	Delta III, Delta IV, **Space Launch System Block I** (as Interim Cryogenic Propulsion Stage)		In service	
Electron Second Stage	New Zealand	**Electron**		In service	
Exploration Upper Stage	United States		Space Launch System	In development	
Falcon 9 Second Stage	United States	**Falcon 9**, **Falcon Heavy**		In service	
Fregat	Russia	Soyuz-U, **Soyuz-FG**, **Soyuz-2**, **Zenit-3F**		In service	
Inertial Upper Stage	United States	Titan 34D, Titan IV, Space Shuttle		Retired	
KVTK	Russia		Angara A5, Energia	In development	
PAM-G	India		Geosynchronous Satellite Launch Vehicle	In development	
Payload Assist Module/Star-48B	United States	Delta 3000, Delta 4000, **Delta II**, Space Shuttle	Delta 5000	In service	
Salman	Iran	**Qased, Qaem-100**		In Service	
Saman-1	Iran	**Simorgh**		In Service	
Starship	United States		Starship	In development	It is reusable, and is meant to use orbital refueling.
Transtage	United States	Titan IIIA, Titan IIIC, Titan 34D		Retired	
Volga	Russia	**Soyuz-2.1a**, Soyuz-2-1v			
Yuanzheng-1	China	**Long March 3B**, **Long March 3C**		In service	
Yuanzheng-1A	China	**Long March 7**		In service	
Yuanzheng-2	China	**Long March 5**		In service	

== See also ==
- Multistage rocket
- Apogee kick motor
- Space tug
- Lists of rockets
- List of orbital launch systems
- Comparison of orbital launchers families
- Comparison of orbital launch systems
- Comparison of space station cargo vehicles
- List of space launch system designs
- Lists of spacecraft
