= Noor 2 (satellite) =

Iranian military satellite

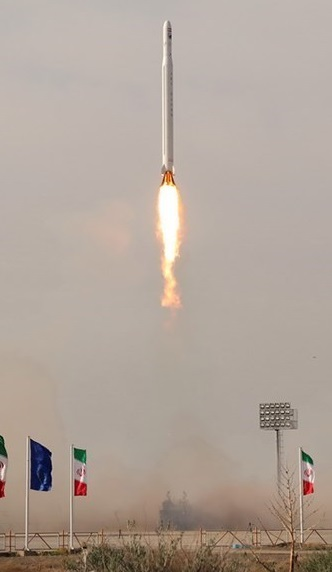
A photo of the moment of launching the triple launcher carrying the Iranian satellite Noor-2

The Nour 2 satellite (also spelled Noor 2, Persian: ماهواره نور, lit. 'Light') callsign "NOUR 02" or "NOOR 02", is an Iranian military satellite, which was launched into orbit on 8 March 2022. The Nour 2 satellite was lifted into space by the three-stage launcher Qased, or "Messenger". The satellite was placed into orbit at an altitude of 500 km. Before, the Islamic Revolutionary Guard Corps Aerospace Force (IRGCASF) launched the Nour 1 satellite into space on 22 April 2020 with the three-stage launcher Qased. The Nour 1 had reached an orbit of 425 kilometers above the surface of the Earth.

== Satellite launch ==
On 8 March 2022, the Nour 2 satellite, callsign "NOUR 02" or "NOOR 02", the Iranian military satellite, was launched to orbit by IRGCASF. The Nour 2 satellite was lifted into space from the Shahroud spaceport by the three-stage launcher Qased, or "Messenger," which utilizes a combination of liquid and solid fuels. Before 22 April 2020, the IRGCASF launched the Nour 1 satellite into space with the three-stage launcher Qased. The Nour 1 had reached an orbit of 425 kilometers above the surface of the Earth.

=== Operation ===
The Reconnaissance satellite orbits the Earth once every 90 minutes, and its mission will last three years.

On 10 May 2022, Iranian Minister of Communication and Information Technology, Issa Zarepour posted on his Instagram several images displaying the flat views of lands of Marvdasht in Fars province and Khormoj in Bushehr province in Southern Iran and a low-resolution, true-color, overhead image of the U.S. Navy's Fifth Fleet Base in Bahrain taken by the Noor-2 satellite. The minister's account was banned from Instagram hours later.

Noor-class Satellites
English name	Persian Name	Launch Date	Altitude	COSPAR	Operational Status
Noor-1	ماهواره نور ۱	22 April 2020	425 km	2020-024A	Non-operational, decayed from orbit on 13 April 2022
Noor-2	ماهواره نور ۲	13 April 2022	500 km	2022-024A	Operational

== Launch reactions ==
The attempts to launch were criticized by the United States, Germany, and France.

The U.S. claimed Iran would use the same long-range ballistic technology as Intercontinental ballistic missiles, launching more long-range weapons, including nuclear warheads. Iran rejected the claim by the US and described the purpose of launching satellites and missiles as civilian and defensive.

== See also ==
- Noor (satellite)
- List of air forces
- List of space forces
