= Noor-1 =

Noor-1 may refer to:

- First of the Noor (satellite) class of satellites
- Phase 1 of Ouarzazate Solar Power Station (also called Noor Power Station)
