= Project Koussar =

Alleged Iranian missile program

Project Koussar, also known as Project Kowsar, is an alleged intermediate range or intercontinental ballistic missile program of the Islamic Republic of Iran.

== Overview ==
The program is allegedly an IRBM with a range of 4,000 to 5,000 km.

The book Iran's Military Forces and Warfighting Capabilities by Anthony H. Cordesman and Martin Kleiber mentions Project Koussar in its description of the Shahab-5 and Shahab-6 missile projects, which also are allegedly based on the RD-216 engine. According to the book, "the effort to develop an ICBM with the Russian RD-216 engine in some sources has been named 'Project Koussar.' There reports about the missile projects remain uncertain, and Israeli media and official sources have repeatedly exaggerated the nature and speed of Iranian efforts."

The book Tehran Rising by Ilan Berman also mentions the missile project. According to the book, "Opposition groups have charged that Iran's overt missile development masks a much larger clandestine endeavor - one that encompasses both the 4,000-kilometer range Shahab-5 and even a follow in intercontinental ballistic missile (ICBM) known as the 'Kowsar'. This assessment rings true; according to U.S. intelligence officials, Iran is now estimated to have made sufficient headway to allow for testing of ICBM components in 2005."

== See also ==
- Qaem 100 - Iran satellite launch vehicle (SLV)
