= Soraya (satellite) =

Iranian satellite

- Mission type: Communication
- Operator: Iranian Space Agency; Iranian Space Research Center
- COSPAR ID: 2024-015A
- SATCAT no.: 58817
- Mission duration: 2 years, 5 months, 28 days (in progress)

Spacecraft properties
- Manufacturer: Iranian Space Research Center
- Launch mass: 50 kg
- Power: Solar

Start of mission
- Launch date: 20 January 2024 06:28:34 UTC
- Rocket: Qaem 100
- Launch site: Shahroud Space Center
- Contractor: IRGC

Orbital parameters
- Reference system: Geocentric
- Regime: Low Earth
- Periapsis altitude: 744 km
- Apoapsis altitude: 760 km
- Inclination: 64.5°

Soraya (Persian: ثریا, IPA: [soɹæj.jɒ́ː]), also spelled Sorayya, is an Iranian remote sensing satellite of the SRI series of research satellites built by the Iranian Space Research Center and sent into a 750 km Low Earth orbit on 20 January 2024 by an Iranian Qaem 100 rocket.

The Iranian Minister of Communications announced that Soraya was placed into orbit by Qaem 100 satellite carrier in 11 minutes. On the next day, he reported the signals and telemetry data received on the night of 20 January showed the satellite was working properly.

Reports indicate that several countries, including France, Britain, and Germany, expressed concern after Iran launched the Soraya satellite due to Iran's possible acquisition of long-range ballistic technology. The United States also considered Iran to be in violation of a UN Security Council resolution.
