= Intercontinental ballistic missile =

Ballistic missile with a range of more than 5,500 kilometres

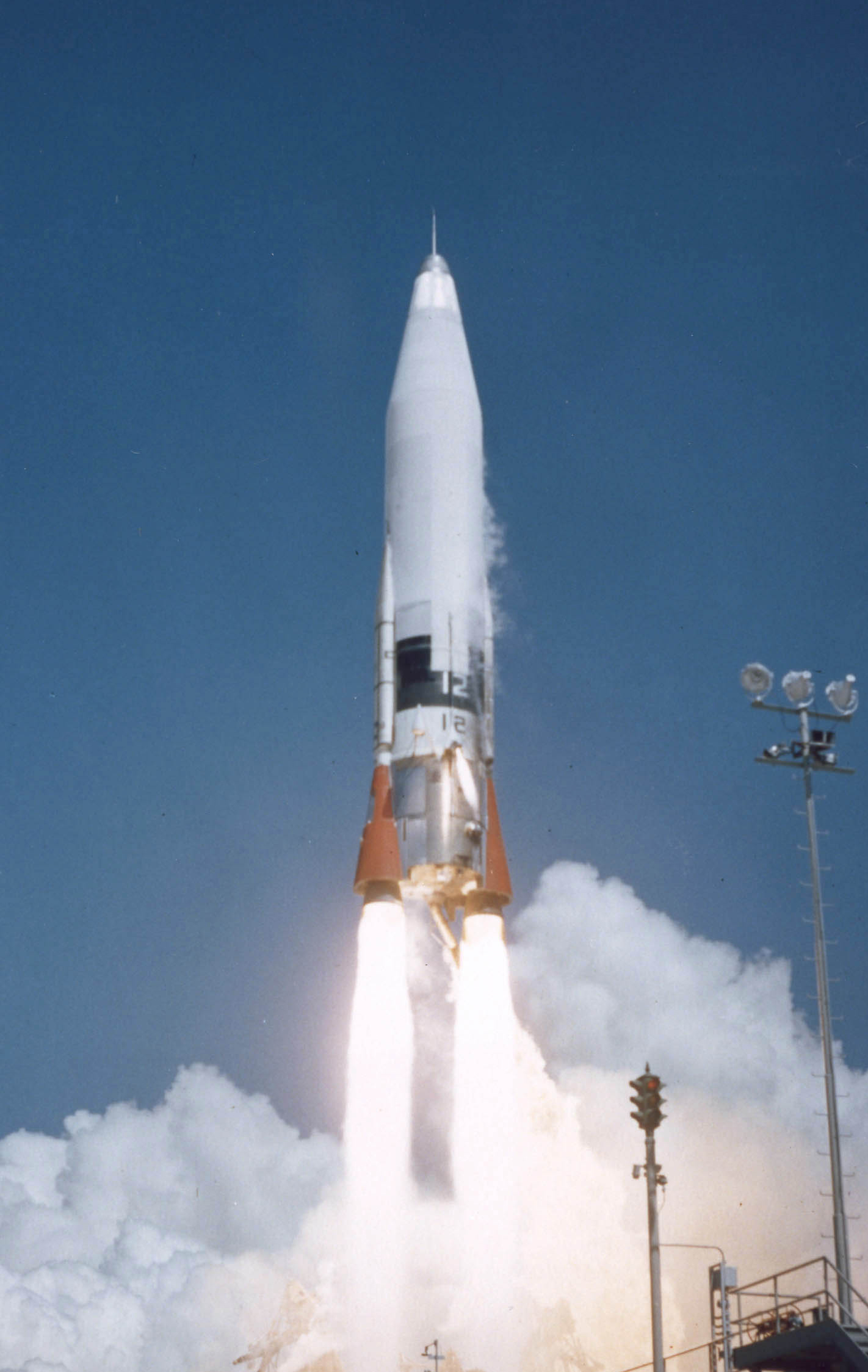
An SM-65 Atlas, the first US ICBM, first launched in 1957

Minuteman III launch from Vandenberg Space Force Base, California, on 9 February 2023.

An intercontinental ballistic missile (ICBM) is a ballistic missile with a range greater than 5,500 kilometres (3,400 mi), primarily designed for nuclear weapons delivery (delivering one or more thermonuclear warheads). Conventional, chemical, and biological weapons can also be delivered with varying effectiveness but have never been deployed on ICBMs. Some modern designs support multiple independently targetable reentry vehicles (MIRVs), allowing a single missile to carry several warheads, each of which can strike a different target. The United States, Russia, China, France, India, the United Kingdom, Israel, and North Korea are the only countries known to have operational ICBMs. Pakistan is the only nuclear-armed country that does not possess ICBMs.

ICBM development was a central part of the nuclear arms race of the Cold War, with early development led by the Soviet Union and the US. The world's first ICBM was the R-7 Semyorka, tested in 1957. Early designs used liquid propellant, often cryogenic, which require fuelling before launch, meaning high response time and low availability. Solid-propellant ICBMs do not require fuelling, having a much lower response time. ICBMs also shifted from early missile silo fields to later truck-based transporter erector launchers. Many have been adapted into space launch vehicles. The permanent members of the United Nations Security Council all possess submarine-launched ballistic missiles with intercontinental range.

Early ICBMs had limited precision, which made them suitable for use only against 'area' targets, such as cities. They were seen as a "safe" basing option, one that would keep the deterrent force close to home where it would be difficult to attack. Attacks against military targets (especially hardened ones) demanded the use of a more precise, crewed bomber. Second- and third-generation designs (such as the LGM-118 Peacekeeper) dramatically improved accuracy to the point where even the smallest point targets can be successfully attacked.

ICBMs are differentiated by having greater range and speed than other ballistic missiles: intermediate-range ballistic missiles (IRBMs), medium-range ballistic missiles (MRBMs), short-range ballistic missiles (SRBMs) and tactical ballistic missiles.

== History ==
=== World War II ===
Primary views of an R-7 Semyorka, the world's first ICBM and satellite launch vehicle

The first practical design for an ICBM grew out of Nazi Germany's V-2 rocket program. The liquid-fueled V-2, designed by Wernher von Braun and his team, was then widely used by Nazi Germany from mid-1944 until March 1945 to bomb British and Belgian cities, particularly Antwerp and London.

Under Projekt Amerika, von Braun's team developed the A9/10 ICBM, intended for use in bombing New York and other American cities. Initially intended to be guided by radio, it was changed to be a piloted craft after the failure of Operation Elster. The second stage of the A9/A10 rocket was tested a few times in January and February 1945.

After the war, the US executed Operation Paperclip, which took von Braun and hundreds of other leading Nazi scientists to the United States to develop IRBMs, ICBMs, and launchers for the US Army.

This technology was predicted by US General of the Army Hap Arnold, who wrote in 1943:

Someday, not too distant, there can come streaking out of somewhere – we won't be able to hear it, it will come so fast – some kind of gadget with an explosive so powerful that one projectile will be able to wipe out completely this city of Washington.

=== Cold War ===
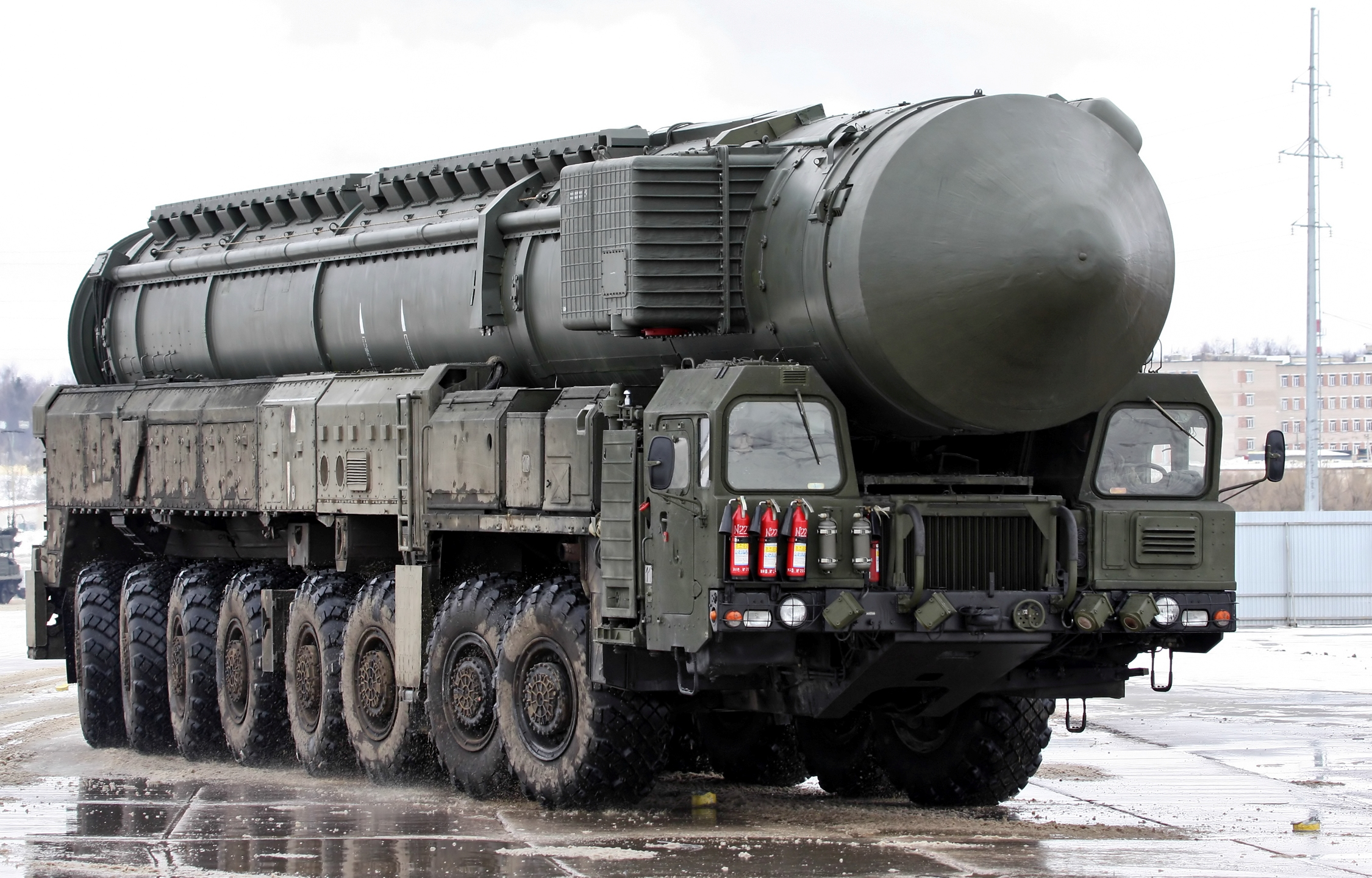
MZKT-79221 transporter erector launcher carrying missile container during rehearsals for the 2012 Moscow Victory Day Parade.

After World War II, the Americans and the Soviets started rocket research programs based on the V-2 and other German wartime designs. Each branch of the US military started its own programs, leading to considerable duplication of effort. In the Soviet Union, rocket research was centrally organized although several teams worked on different designs.

The US initiated ICBM research in 1946 with the RTV-A-2 Hiroc project. This was a three-stage effort with the ICBM development not starting until the third stage. However, funding was cut in 1948 after only three partially successful launches of the second stage design, that was used to test variations of the V-2 design. With overwhelming air superiority and truly intercontinental bombers, the newly formed US Air Force did not take the problem of ICBM development seriously. Things changed in 1953 with the Soviet testing of their first thermonuclear weapon, but it was not until 1954 that the Atlas missile program was given the highest national priority. The Atlas A first flew on 11 June 1957; the flight lasted only about 24 seconds before the rocket exploded. The first successful flight of an Atlas missile to full range occurred 28 November 1958. The first armed version of the Atlas, the Atlas D, was declared operational in January 1959 at Vandenberg, although it had not yet flown. The first test flight was carried out on 9 July 1959, and the missile was accepted for service on 1 September. The Titan I was another US multistage ICBM, with a successful launch 5 February 1959, with Titan I A3. Unlike the Atlas, the Titan I was a two-stage missile, unlike the Atlas' unique stage-and-a-half design. The Titan was larger, yet lighter, than the Atlas. Due to the improvements in engine technology and guidance systems the Titan I overtook the Atlas.

"The Martin Company: Ten Years To Remember" (1964). Official USAF ICBM development promotional film reel.

In the Soviet Union, early development was focused on missiles able to attack European targets. That changed in 1953, when Sergei Korolev was directed to start development of a true ICBM able to deliver newly developed hydrogen bombs. Given steady funding throughout, the R-7 developed with some speed. The first launch took place on 15 May 1957 and led to an unintended crash 400 km (250 mi) from the site. The first successful test followed on 21 August 1957; the R-7 flew over 6,000 km (3,700 mi) and became the world's first ICBM. The first strategic-missile unit became operational on 9 February 1959 at Plesetsk in north-west Russia.

It was the same R-7 launch vehicle that placed the first artificial satellite in space, Sputnik, on 4 October 1957. The first human spaceflight in history was accomplished on a derivative of R-7, Vostok, on 12 April 1961, by Soviet cosmonaut Yuri Gagarin. A heavily modernized version of the R-7 is still used as the launch vehicle for the Soviet/Russian Soyuz spacecraft, marking more than 60 years of operational history of Korolyov's original rocket design.

The R-7 and Atlas each required a large launch facility, making them vulnerable to attack, and could not be kept in a ready state. Failure rates were very high throughout the early years of ICBM technology. Human spaceflight programs (Vostok, Mercury, Voskhod, Gemini, etc.) served as a highly visible means of demonstrating confidence in reliability, with successes translating directly to national defense implications. The US was well behind the Soviets in the Space Race and so US President John F. Kennedy increased the stakes with the Apollo program, which used Saturn rocket technology that had been funded by President Dwight D. Eisenhower.

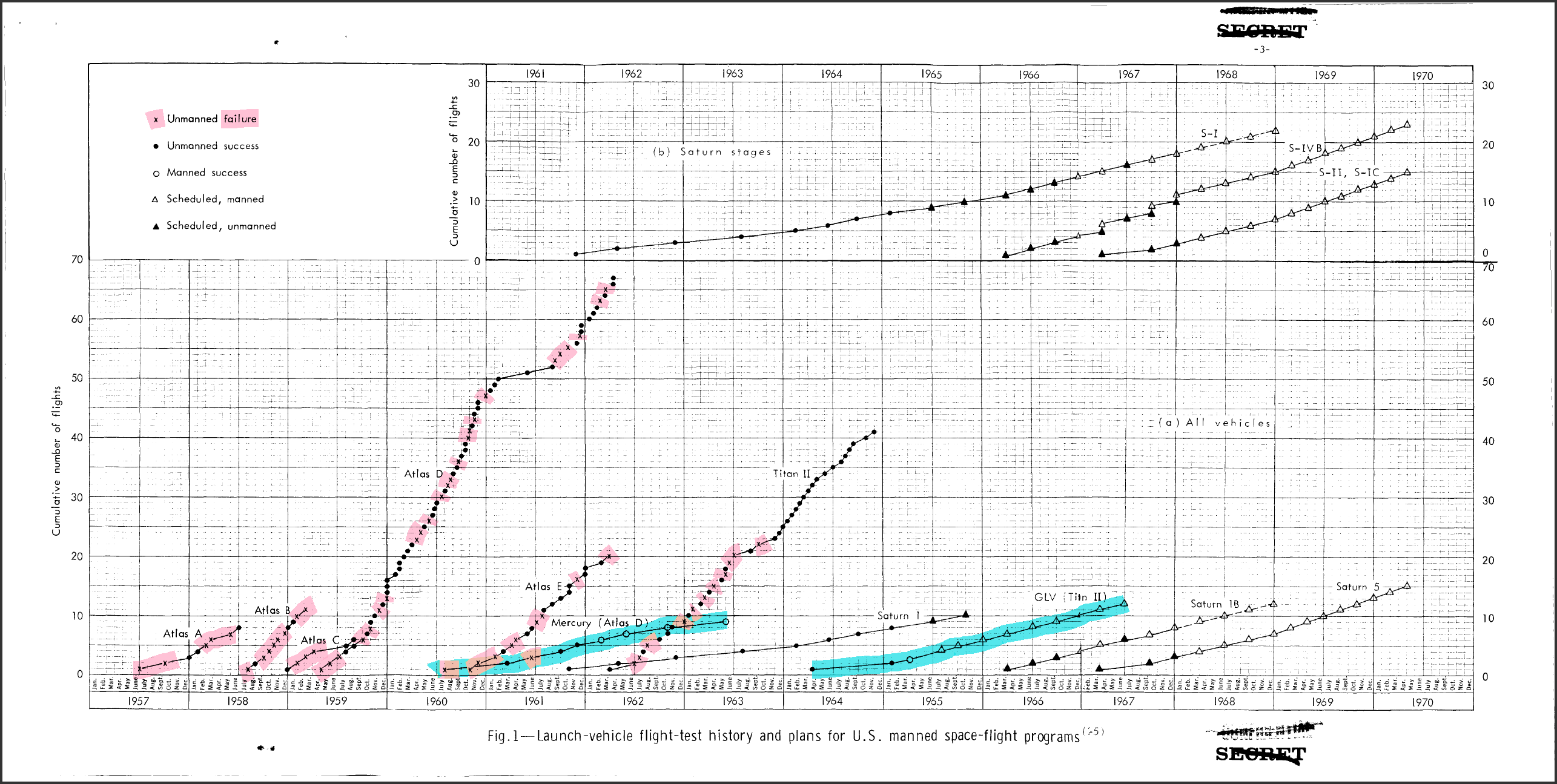
1965 graph of USAF Atlas and Titan ICBM launches, cumulative by month with failures highlighted (pink), showing how NASA's use of ICBM boosters for Projects Mercury and Gemini (blue) served as a visible demonstration of reliability at a time when failure rates had been substantial.

These early ICBMs also formed the basis of many space launch systems. Examples include R-7, Atlas, Redstone, Titan, and Proton, which was derived from the earlier ICBMs but never deployed as an ICBM. The Eisenhower administration supported the development of solid-fueled missiles such as the LGM-30 Minuteman, Polaris and Skybolt. Modern ICBMs tend to be smaller than their ancestors, due to increased accuracy and smaller and lighter warheads, and use solid fuels, making them less useful as orbital launch vehicles.

The Western view of the deployment of these systems was governed by the strategic theory of mutual assured destruction. In the 1950s and 1960s, development began on anti-ballistic missile systems by both the Americans and Soviets. Such systems were restricted by the 1972 Anti-Ballistic Missile Treaty. The first successful ABM test was conducted by the Soviets in 1961, which later deployed a fully operational system defending Moscow in the 1970s (see Moscow ABM system).

"Minutemen Missile And Mission" (1962) Official de-classified information film reel.

The 1972 SALT treaty froze the number of ICBM launchers of both the Americans and the Soviets at existing levels and allowed new submarine-based SLBM launchers only if an equal number of land-based ICBM launchers were dismantled. Subsequent talks, called SALT II, were held from 1972 to 1979 and actually reduced the number of nuclear warheads held by the US and Soviets. SALT II was never ratified by the US Senate, but its terms were honored by both sides until 1986, when the Reagan administration "withdrew" after it had accused the Soviets of violating the pact.

In the 1980s, President Ronald Reagan launched the Strategic Defense Initiative which funded large amounts of research into space-based ABM systems, such as Brilliant Pebbles. as well as launching the MX and Midgetman ICBM programs.

China developed a minimal independent nuclear deterrent entering its own cold war after an ideological split with the Soviet Union beginning in the early 1960s. After first testing a domestic built nuclear weapon in 1964, it went on to develop various warheads and missiles. Beginning in the early 1970s, the 3-stage liquid fueled DF-5 ICBM was developed and used as a satellite launch vehicle in 1975. with a range of 10,000 to 12,000 km (6,200 to 7,500 mi)—long enough to strike the Western United States and the Soviet Union—was silo deployed, with the first pair in service by 1981 and possibly twenty missiles in service by the late 1990s. China also deployed the JL-1 Medium-range ballistic missile with a reach of 1,700 kilometres (1,100 mi) aboard the ultimately unsuccessful Type 092 submarine.

=== Post–Cold War ===
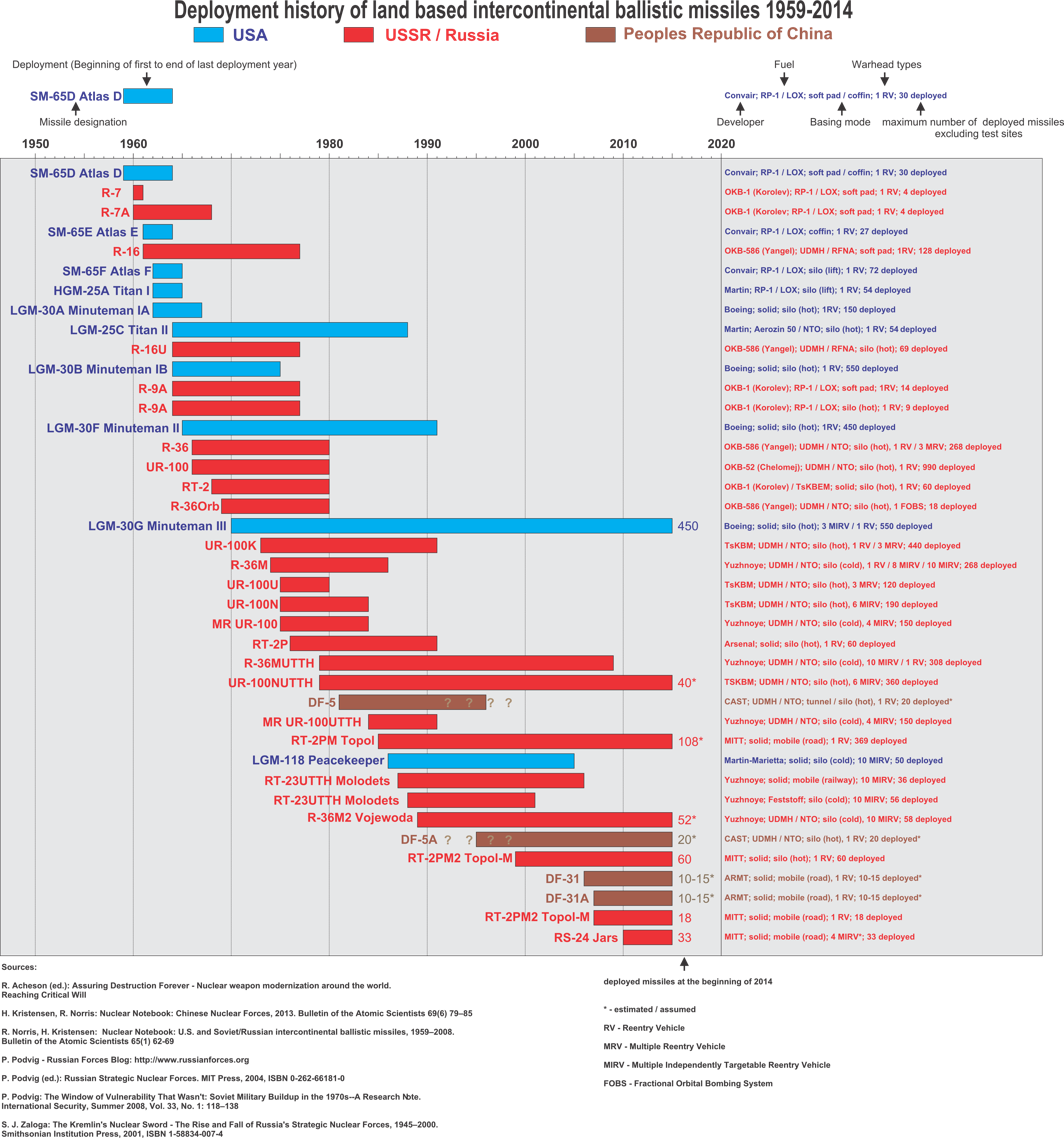
Deployment history of land-based ICBM, 1959–2014

Topol-M launch from silo

In 1991, the United States and the Soviet Union agreed in the START I treaty to reduce their deployed ICBMs and attributed warheads. This treaty expired in 2009 and was replaced in 2010 by the New START treaty, signed by US President Barack Obama and Russian Federation President Dmitry Medvedev. In February 2023 the Russian Federation suspended its participation in the treaty. The New START treaty expired in February of 2026, leaving no major Nuclear proliferation treaties between the United States and any other nation.

As of 2016, all five of the nations with permanent seats on the United Nations Security Council have fully operational long-range ballistic missile systems; Russia, the United States, and China also have land-based ICBMs (the US missiles are silo-based, while China and Russia have both silo and road-mobile (DF-31, RT-2PM2 Topol-M missiles).

Israel is believed to have deployed a road mobile nuclear ICBM, the Jericho III, which entered service in 2008; an upgraded version is in development.

As of 2026, China has silo launched, submarine launched, and road mobile ICBMs, with the third largest ICBM arsenal on earth at over 300 missiles, Including MIRVs and warheads in excess of 1 megaton. China rapidly modernized its nuclear arsenal, along with the rest of its military forces between the early 2000's and the early 2020's. with a warhead count estimated to be above 600, however nearly all Chinese warheads are thought to be stored separate from their launchers.

India successfully test fired Agni V, with a strike range of more than 5,000 km (3,100 mi) on 19 April 2012, joining the ranks of ICBM armed nations. The missile's actual range was speculated by foreign researchers to be up to 8,000 km (5,000 mi) with India having downplayed its capabilities to avoid causing concern to other countries. On 15 December 2022, first night trial of Agni-V was successfully carried out by the Indian Strategic Forces Command from Abdul Kalam Island, Odisha. The missile launched during this test was claimed to be 20 percent lighter, with a stated range of 7,000 km. On 12 March 2024 India announced that it had successfully tested a 'multiple independently targetable reentry vehicle' (MIRV).

By 2012, there was speculation by some intelligence agencies that North Korea had been secretly developing an ICBM. North Korea successfully put a satellite into space on 12 December 2012 using the 32-metre-tall (105 ft) Unha-3 rocket. The United States claimed that the launch was in fact a way to test an ICBM. (See Timeline of first orbital launches by country.) In early July 2017, North Korea claimed for the first time to have tested successfully an ICBM capable of carrying a large thermonuclear warhead.

Most countries in the early stages of developing ICBMs have used liquid propellants, with the known exceptions being the Indian Agni-V, the planned but cancelled South African RSA-4 ICBM, and the now in service Israeli Jericho III.

The RS-28 Sarmat (Russian: РС-28 Сармат; NATO reporting name: SATAN 2), is a Russian liquid-fueled, MIRV-equipped, super-heavy thermonuclear armed intercontinental ballistic missile in development by the Makeyev Rocket Design Bureau from 2009, intended to replace the previous R-36 missile. Its large payload would allow for up to 10 heavy warheads or 15 lighter ones or up to 24 hypersonic glide vehicles Yu-74, or a combination of warheads and massive amounts of countermeasures designed to defeat anti-missile systems; it was announced by the Russian military as a response to the US Prompt Global Strike.

In July 2023, North Korea fired a suspected intercontinental ballistic missile that landed short of Japanese waters. The launch follows North Korea's threat to retaliate against the US for alleged spy plane incursions.

== Operation ==
=== Targeting ===
United States: Strategic targets for an ICBM are determined via espionage, aerial reconnaissance, and reconnaissance satellites, among other methods, once valid targets are determined they are stored in a vault and assigned to the crews servicing the weapon. In most cases the crews do not know what their target will be until authorization is given to launch. Only the President of the United States or their successor can authorize a launch.

=== Launch ===
The earliest ICBMs were launched from above-ground launch mounts, in a similar fashion to modern orbital rockets. In some cases the rocket was stored upright, and in others it was stored horizontally, and then lifted into position before launch.

Later ICBMs used a variety of launch platforms such as:

- Underground concrete missile silos, which offer some protection from military attack (including, the designers hope, some protection from a nuclear first strike)
- Submarines: submarine-launched ballistic missiles (SLBMs); most SLBMs are ICBMs, but generally SLBMs have a shorter range than silo-based missiles due to weight and size constraints. A SLBM equipped submarine is extremely difficult to detect and destroy in a first strike.
- Transporter erector launchers (TELs) which are launch platforms mounted on heavy trucks, capable of moving through roadless terrain, and launching a missile from any point along its route.
- Mobile launchers on rails; this applies, for example, to РТ-23УТТХ "Молодец" (RT-23UTTH "Molodets" – SS-24 "Scalpel")
- Strategic bombers launching Air-launched ballistic missiles.

The last four kinds are mobile and therefore hard to detect prior to a missile launch. During storage, one of the most important features of the missile is its serviceability. One of the key features of the first computer-controlled ICBM, the Minuteman missile, was that it could quickly and easily use its computer to test itself.

ICBMs usually use the trajectory which optimizes range for a given amount of payload (the minimum-energy trajectory); an alternative is a depressed trajectory, which allows less payload, shorter flight time, and has a much lower apogee.

After launch, the following flight phases can be distinguished:

=== Boost ===
Boost phase, after launch, a rocket booster powers the missile through the boost phase along a ballistic trajectory, and is separated when fuel is depleted. This phase is shorter for a solid-fuel rocket than for a liquid-propellant rocket. Depending on the trajectory chosen, typical burnout speed is 4 km/s (2.5 mi/s), up to 7.8 km/s (4.8 mi/s). The altitude of the missile at the end of this phase is typically 150 to 400 km (90 to 250 mi). Most modern boosters are solid-propellant rocket motors, which can be stored easily for long periods of time. Early missiles used liquid-fueled rocket motors, which require much more maintenance of cryogenic systems, as well as having more expensive and complex rocket motors.

=== Midcourse ===
Midcourse phase, which lasts approximately 25 minutes, is sub-orbital spaceflight with the flight path being a part of an ellipse with a vertical major axis. The apogee (highest point in the flight, approximately halfway through the midcourse phase) is at an altitude of approximately 1,200 km (750 mi). The semi-major axis is between 3,186 and 6,372 km (1,980 and 3,959 mi) and the projection of the flight path on the Earth's surface is close to a great circle, though slightly displaced due to earth rotation during the time of flight. After the booster falls away, the remaining "bus" carries the payload, which may be one, or several independent warheads and penetration aids, such as metallic-coated balloons, aluminum chaff, and/or full-scale warhead decoys. Each of which continues on its own ballistic trajectory, much like an artillery shell or cannonball. The "bus" may have a limited capacity to make orbital maneuvers to change the projected impact point of the payload(s).

=== Terminal ===
Reentry/Terminal phase, which lasts around two minutes starting at an altitude of 100 km; 62 mi. The warhead is encased in a cone-shaped reentry vehicle and is difficult to detect in this phase of flight as there is no rocket exhaust or other emissions to mark its position to defenders. The high speeds of the warheads (in excess of 15,000 miles per hour) during this phase make them difficult to intercept with anything but anti-ballistic missiles equipped with nuclear warheads. The warheads are equipped to air burst at a certain altitude above the ground to maximize destruction from a given yield.

== Modern ICBMs ==
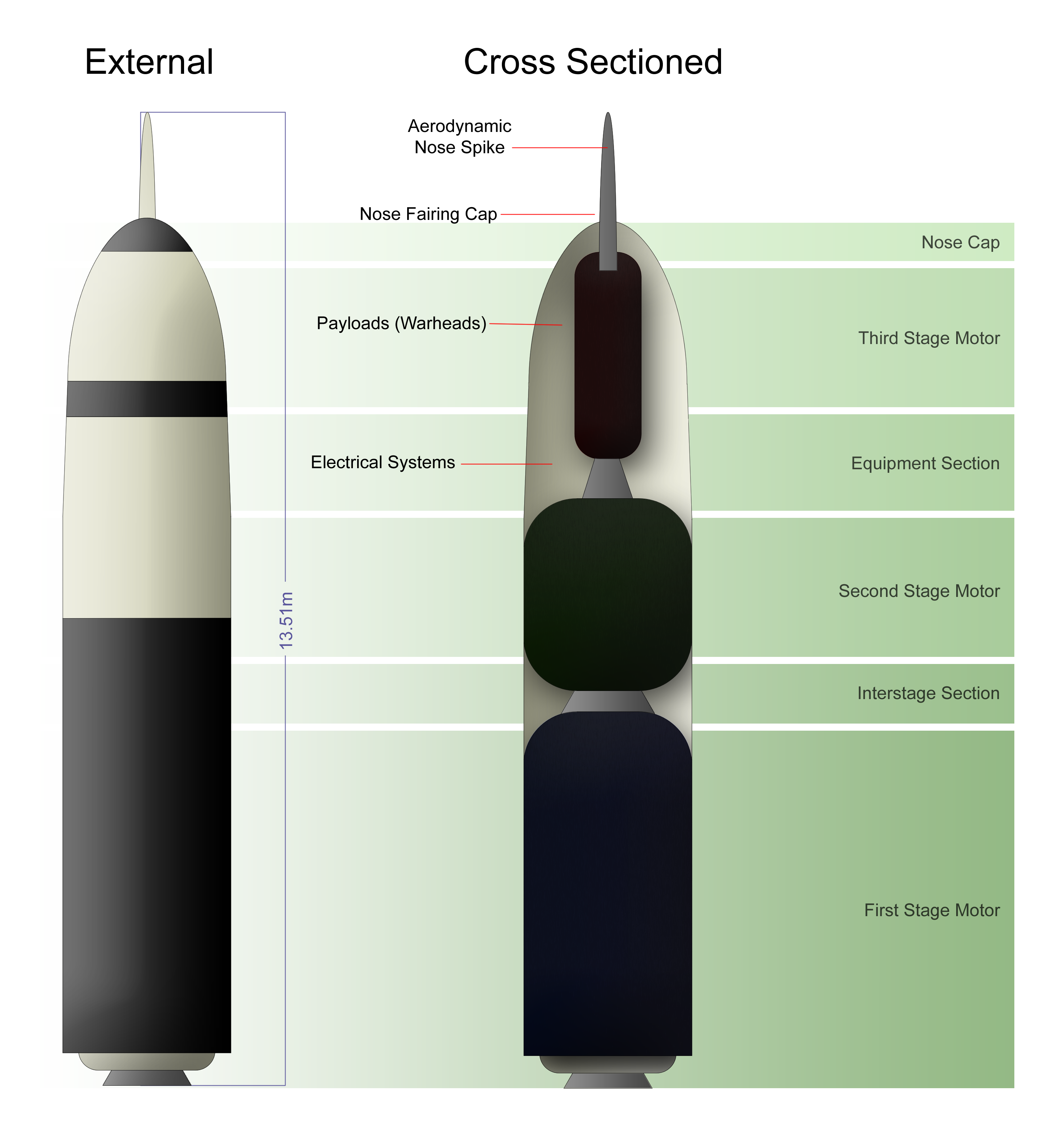
Schematic view of a submarine-launched Trident II D5 nuclear missile system, capable of carrying multiple nuclear warheads up to 8,000 km (5,000 mi)

Modern ICBMs typically carry multiple independently targetable reentry vehicles (MIRVs), each of which carries a separate nuclear warhead, allowing a single missile to hit multiple targets. MIRV was an outgrowth of the rapidly shrinking size and weight of modern warheads and the Strategic Arms Limitation Treaties (SALT I and SALT II), which imposed limitations on the number of launch vehicles. It has also proved to be an "easy answer" to proposed deployments of anti-ballistic missile (ABM) systems: It is far less expensive to add more warheads to an existing missile system than to build an ABM system capable of shooting down the additional warheads; hence, most ABM system proposals have been judged to be impractical.

SS-24 rail-based ICBM launch

Minimization of circular error probable is crucial, because halving the circular error probable decreases the needed warhead energy by a factor of four; thus allowing for highly accurate missiles to effectively utilize lower-yield (and thus less expensive) warheads to achieve the same effects. Accuracy is limited by the accuracy of the navigation system. Systems that have been used historically include, but are not limited to: inertial guidance (or 'Dead Reckoning'), celestial navigation, and radio navigation. Additionally, accuracy is limited by the available geodetic information, such as local gravity.

Strategic missile systems are thought to use custom integrated circuits designed to calculate navigational differential equations thousands to millions of FLOPS in order to reduce navigational errors caused by calculation alone. These circuits are usually a network of binary addition circuits that continually recalculate the missile's position. The inputs to the navigation circuit are set by a general-purpose computer according to a navigational input schedule loaded into the missile before launch.

One particular weapon developed by the Soviet Union – the Fractional Orbital Bombardment System – had a partial orbital trajectory, and unlike most ICBMs its target could not be deduced from its orbital flight path. It was decommissioned in compliance with arms control agreements, which address the maximum range of ICBMs and prohibit orbital or fractional-orbital weapons. However, according analysts, Russia is working on the capability of their Sarmat ICBM to leverage fractional orbital concepts to fly a reversed southern polar approach instead of flying over the northern polar regions. It is theorized that, by using that approach, it could potentially avoid the American missile defense batteries in California and Alaska.

New development of ICBM technology are ICBMs able to carry hypersonic glide vehicles or 'HGVs' as a payload.

As the nuclear warhead reenters the Earth's atmosphere, its high speed causes compression of the air, leading to a dramatic rise in temperature which would destroy it, if it were not shielded in some way. In one design, warhead components are contained within an aluminium honeycomb substructure, sheathed in a pyrolytic carbon-epoxy synthetic resin composite material heat shield. Warheads are also often radiation-hardened (to protect against nuclear armed ABMs or the nearby detonation of friendly warheads), one neutron-resistant material developed for this purpose in the UK is three-dimensional quartz phenolic.

== Specific ICBMs ==
=== Land-based ICBMs ===
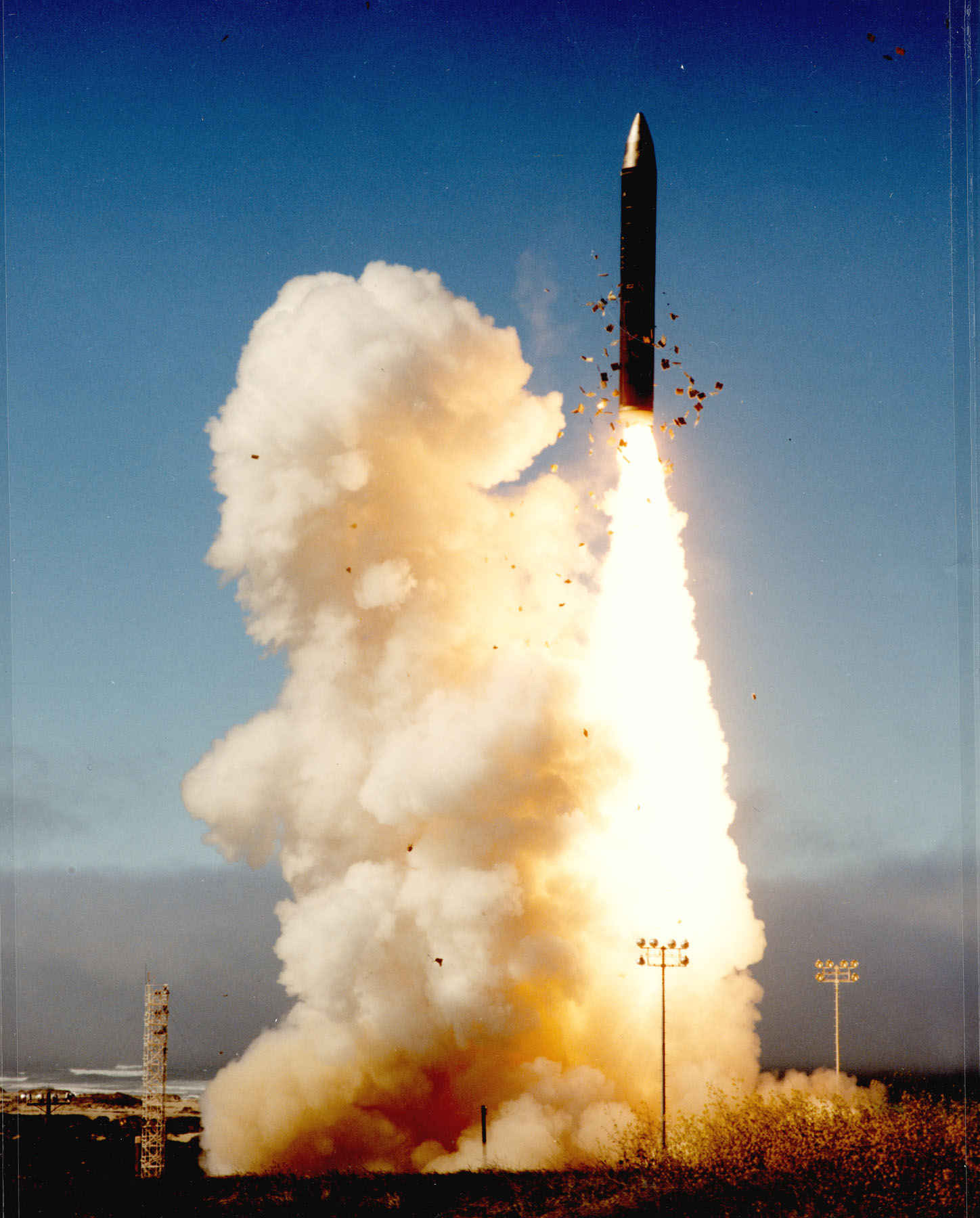
A US Peacekeeper missile launched from a silo

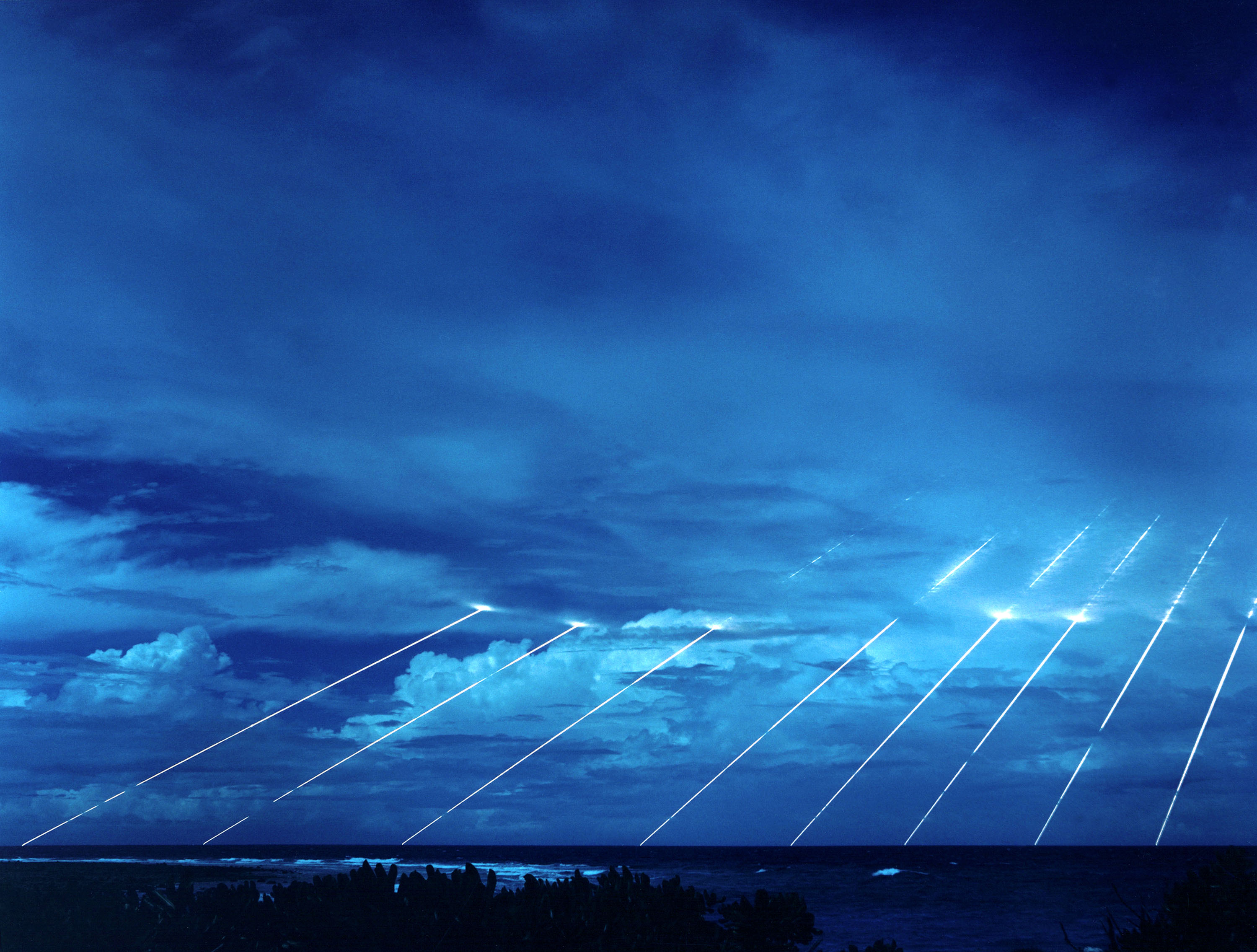
Testing of the Peacekeeper re-entry vehicles at the Kwajalein Atoll. All eight fired from only one missile. Each line, if its warhead were live, represents the potential explosive power of about 300 kilotons of TNT, about 20 times that of the detonation of the atomic bomb in Hiroshima.

Operational
Under development
Decommissioned or cancelled

Type	Minimum range (km)	Maximum range (km)	Country
LGM-30 Minuteman III		14,000	United States
RS-28 Sarmat		18,000	Russia
RT-2UTTH "Topol M" (SS-27)		11,000	Russia
RS-24 "Yars" (SS-29)		11,000	Russia
UR-100N		10,000	Soviet Union Russia
R-36 (SS-18)	10,200	16,000	Soviet Union Russia
DF-4	5,500	7,000	China
DF-31	7,200	11,200	China
DF-5	5,000	9,000	China
DF-41	12,000	15,000	China
DF-61	12,000	15,000	China
Hwasong-14	6,700	10,000	North Korea
Hwasong-15		13,000	North Korea
Hwasong-17		15,000	North Korea
Hwasong-18		15,000	North Korea
Hwasong-19		18,000	North Korea
Agni-V	7,000	8,000	India
Jericho III		11,500	Israel
LGM-35 Sentinel			United States
Agni-VI	8,000	12,000	India
Jericho IV			Israel
RS-26 Rubezh		5,800	Russia
Hwasong-20		15,000	North Korea
Yıldırımhan		6,000	Turkey
LGM-30F Minuteman II		11,265	United States
LGM-30A/B Minuteman I		10,186	United States
LGM-118 Peacekeeper		14,000	United States
Titan II (SM-68B, LGM-25C)		16,000	United States
Titan I (SM-68, HGM-25A)		11,300	United States
SM-65 Atlas (SM-65, CGM-16)		10,138	United States
MGM-134 Midgetman		11,000	United States
RTV-A-2 Hiroc	2,400	8,000	United States
RT-2		10,186	Soviet Union
RT-23 Molodets		11,000	Soviet Union Russia
RT-21 Temp 2S		10,500	Soviet Union
R-9 Desna	3,500	6,000	Soviet Union
R-16		13,000	Soviet Union
R-26		12,000	Soviet Union
MR-UR-100 Sotka	1,000	10,320	Soviet Union Russia
UR-100		10,600	Soviet Union
UR-200		12,000	Soviet Union
RT-20P		11,000	Soviet Union
R-7 Semyorka	8,000	8,800	Soviet Union
Hwasong-13	1,500	12,000	North Korea

Russia, the United States, China, North Korea, India and Israel are the only countries currently known to possess land-based ICBMs.

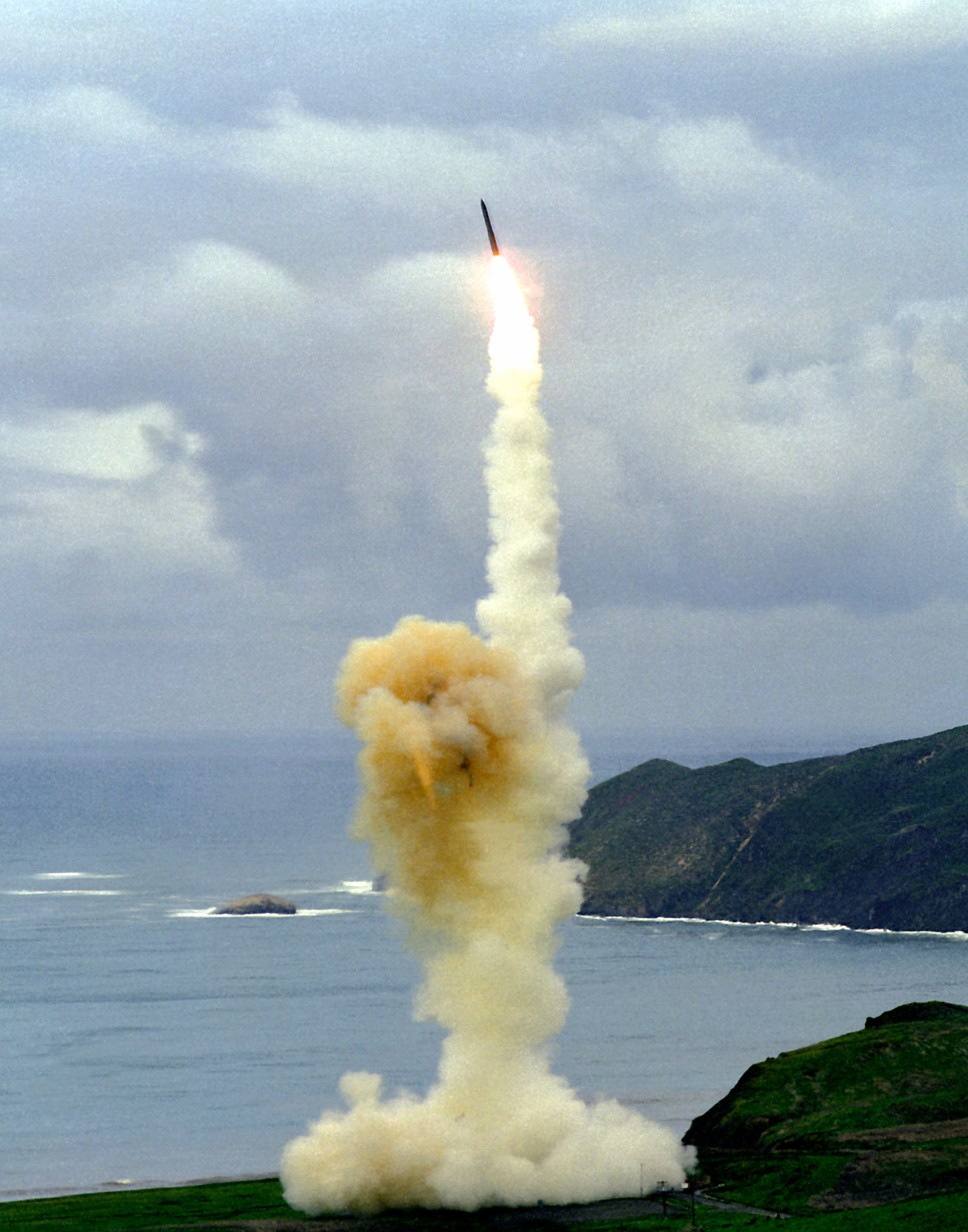
A Minuteman III ICBM test launch from Vandenberg Air Force Base, United States

The United States currently operates 405 ICBMs in three USAF bases. The only model deployed is LGM-30G Minuteman-III. All previous USAF Minuteman II missiles were destroyed in accordance with START II, and their launch silos have been sealed or sold to the public. The powerful MIRV-capable Peacekeeper missiles were phased out in 2005.

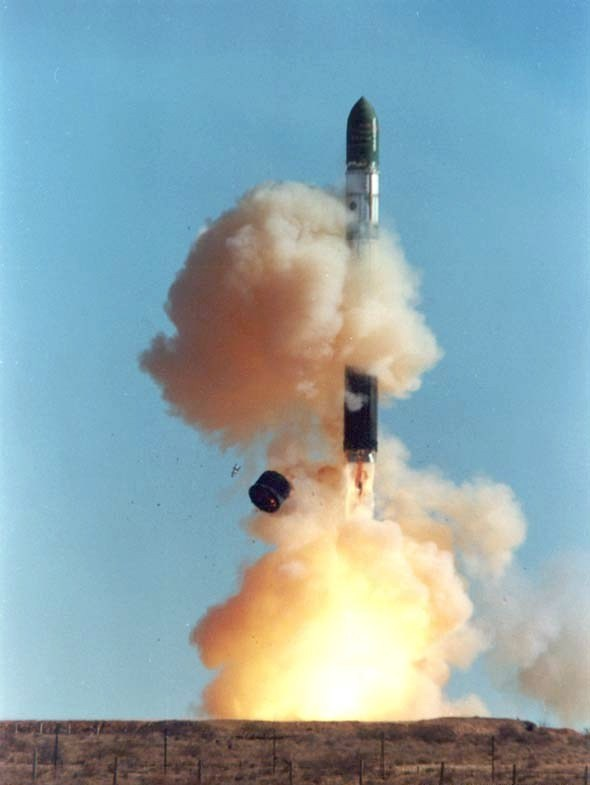
A Soviet R-36M (SS-18 Satan), the largest ICBM in history, with a throw weight of 8,800 kg

The Russian Strategic Rocket Forces have 286 ICBMs able to deliver 958 nuclear warheads: 46 silo-based R-36M2 (SS-18), 30 silo-based UR-100N (SS-19), 36 mobile RT-2PM "Topol" (SS-25), 60 silo-based RT-2UTTH "Topol M" (SS-27), 18 mobile RT-2UTTH "Topol M" (SS-27), 84 mobile RS-24 "Yars" (SS-29), and 12 silo-based RS-24 "Yars" (SS-29).

China has developed several long-range ICBMs, with the third largest ICBM arsenal on earth at over 300 missiles. The DF 31 or CSS-10 is a medium-range, three-stage, solid-propellant intercontinental ballistic missile, and is a land-based variant of the submarine-launched JL-2. The DF-41 or CSS-X-10 can carry up to 10 MIRVs and has a range of approximately 12,000–14,000 km (7,500–8,700 mi). The DF-41 is allegedly deployed underground in Xinjiang, Qinghai, Gansu and Inner Mongolia. The mysterious underground subway ICBM carrier systems are called the "Underground Great Wall Project".

Israel is believed to have deployed a road mobile nuclear ICBM, the Jericho III, which entered service in 2008. It is possible for the missile to be equipped with a single 750 kg (1,650 lb) nuclear warhead or up to three MIRV warheads. It is believed to be based on the Shavit space launch vehicle and is estimated to have a range of 4,800 to 11,500 km (3,000 to 7,100 mi). In November 2011 Israel tested an ICBM believed to be an upgraded version of the Jericho III.

India operates the Agni series of ballistic missiles . On 19 April 2012, India successfully test fired its first Agni-V, a three-stage solid fueled missile, with a strike range of more than 7,500 km (4,700 mi). Missile was test-fired for the second time on 15 September 2013. On 31 January 2015, India conducted a third successful test flight of the Agni-V from the Abdul Kalam Island facility. The test used a roadmobile, canisterised version of the missile, mounted on a heavy duty Tata truck. On 15 December 2022, first night trial of Agni-V was successfully carried out by the Indian Strategic Forces Command from Odisha.

=== Submarine-launched ICBMs ===
Operational
Under development
Decommissioned or Cancelled

Type	Minimum range (km)	Maximum range (km)	Country
UGM-133 Trident II (D5)		12,000	United States United Kingdom
RSM-54 R-29RMU "Sineva"		11,500	Russia
RSM-54 R-29RMU2 "Layner"	8,300	12,000	Russia
RSM-56 R-30 "Bulava"	8,000	9,300	Russia
M51	8,000	10,000	France
JL-2	7,400	8,000	China
JL-3	10,000	12,000	China
K-5		5,000	India
K-6	8,000	10,000	India
Pukguksong-6	4,000	12,000	North Korea
M45		6,000	France
UGM-96 Trident I (C-4)		12,000	United States
RSM-40 R-29 "Vysota"		7,700	Soviet Union Russia
RSM-50 R-29R "Vysota"		6,500	Soviet Union Russia
RSM-52 R-39 "Rif"		8,300	Soviet Union Russia
RSM-54 R-29RM "Shtil"		8,300	Soviet Union Russia

== Missile defense ==
An anti-ballistic missile is a missile which can be deployed to counter an incoming nuclear or non-nuclear ICBM. ICBMs can be intercepted in three regions of their trajectory: boost phase, mid-course phase or terminal phase. The United States, Russia, India, France, Israel, and China have now developed anti-ballistic missile systems. Early examples of anti-ICBM defenses were nuclear tipped systems such as the Soviet A-35 anti-ballistic missile system, and the American Safeguard Program, which were limited by the 1972 Anti-Ballistic Missile Treaty to only cover a limited geographical area. Modern systems (which are almost entirely conventional) include the American Ground-Based Midcourse Defense, RIM-161 Standard Missile 3, the Russian A-135 anti-ballistic missile system and the Israeli Arrow 3.

== See also ==
- Bernard Schriever
- DEFCON
- Dense Pack
- Emergency Action Message
- High-alert nuclear weapon
- ICBM address
- List of states with nuclear weapons
- Nuclear disarmament
- Nuclear navy
- Nuclear warfare
- Submarine
- Throw-weight
- Universal Rocket
- Project Koussar - alleged Iran ICBM program
