= Qaem 100 =

Iranian satellite expendable launch vehicle

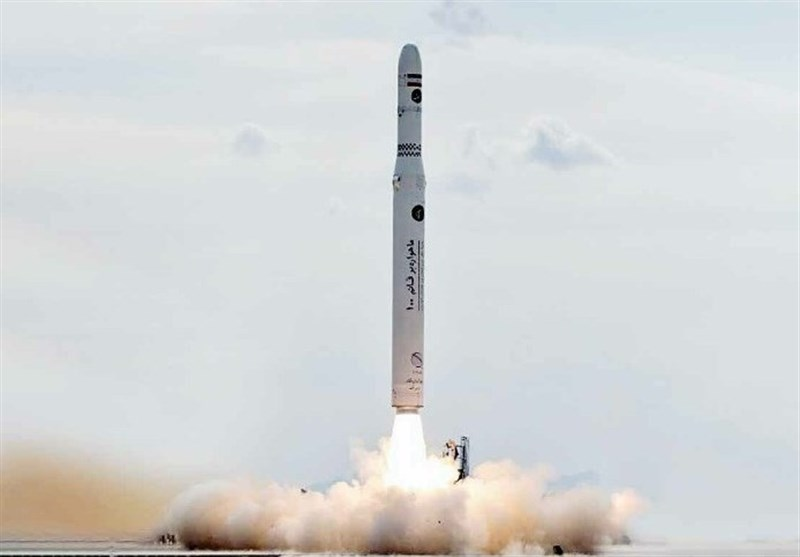
- Function: Small-lift space launch vehicle
- Manufacturer: Islamic Revolutionary Guard Corps
- Country of origin: Iran

Size
- Stages: 3

Capacity

Payload to LEO 500 km
- Mass: 80 kg

Associated rockets
- Family: Qaem
- Based on: Qased

Launch history
- Status: Active
- Launch sites: Shahroud space center
- Total launches: 4 (1 suborbital)
- Success(es): 3 (1 suborbital)
- Failure(s): 1
- First flight: 5 November 2022
- Last flight: 14 September 2024

First stage
- Powered by: Rafe motor
- Maximum thrust: 68,000 kilograms-force (670,000 N; 150,000 lbf)
- Propellant: Solid

Second stage
- Diameter: 1 m
- Powered by: Salman motor
- Burn time: 60 seconds
- Propellant: Solid

Third stage
- Diameter: 1 m
- Powered by: Vahab motor
- Propellant: Solid

Qaem 100 (also Ghaem 100, Persian: قائم ۱۰۰, from a word meaning "upright") is an Iranian expendable, small-lift, space launch vehicle developed by the Islamic Revolutionary Guard Corps (IRGC). It was unveiled on 5 November 2022 and is the first rocket of the Qaem family. After a successful suborbital test flight in 2022, the rocket performed its orbital maiden flight in 2023 carrying the Nahid telecommunication satellite but failed to put it in orbit. In the next launch in 2024, it succeeded in putting the Soraya satellite into 750 km orbit, breaking Iran's previous altitude record.

== Development history ==
In 2020, the Islamic Revolutionary Guard Corps successfully launched its first rocket, the Qased. Experience acquired through the Qased's development allowed the IRGC to develop the Qaem 100. Its first suborbital test flight has been successfully carried out on 5 November 2022. The IRGC then announced Qaem 100 will "soon" be used to launch the Nahid satellite manufactured by the Ministry of Information and Communications Technology of Iran. The Qaem 100 is planned to be followed by other Qaem rockets including the Qaem 105, Qaem 110 and Qaem 120, which will ultimately allow Iran to put satellites into the 36,000 km GEO orbit.

== Design ==
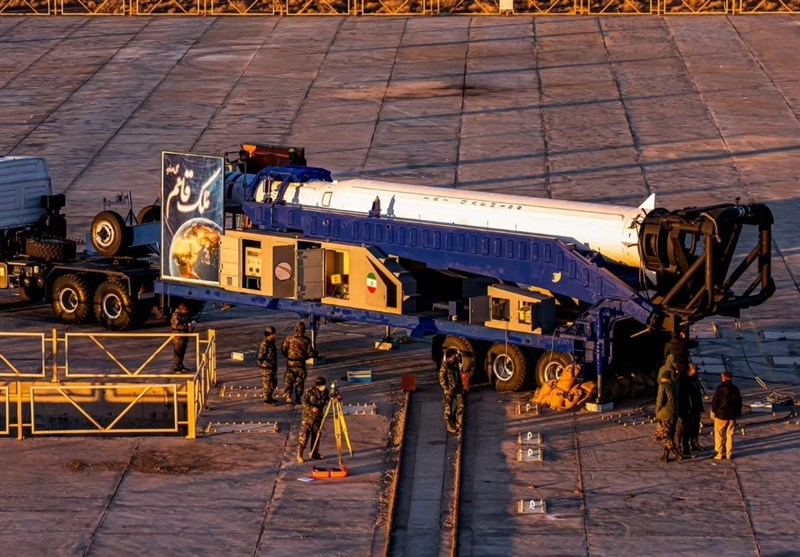
Qaem 100 on the transporter erector launcher truck

Qaem 100 is the first three-stage solid-fueled rocket manufactured by Iran. It will be able to put a satellite weighing 80 kg (180 lb) into a 500 kilometres (310 miles) LEO. This is twice the payload that the Qased rocket can lift while the two missiles weigh the same.

The first stage is the Rafe motor that successfully passed its static ground test in January 2022. Rafe is able to produce 68 tonnes-force (670 kN; 150,000 lbf) of thrust. It uses gimballed thrust vector control (TVC) for steering and has a carbon-fiber composite filament-wound casing, which reduces weight compared to traditional casing. it utilizes Vahab motor as its third stage.

== Launch history ==
Flight No.	Date (UTC)	Launch site	Payload	Orbit	Outcome	Remarks
1	5 November 2022	Shahroud	N/A	Suborbital	Success	Test flight
2	4 March 2023	Shahroud	Nahid-1	LEO	Failure	Maiden orbital flight
3	20 January 2024	Shahroud	Soraya	LEO	Success	First successful orbital flight. Satellite placed into 750 km orbit breaking Iran's previous record.
4	14 September 2024	Shahroud	Chamran-1	LEO	Success	Proof of Repeatability

== See also ==
- IRGC Aerospace Force
- Iranian Space Agency
- Science and technology in Iran
- Project Koussar - alleged Iran ICBM program
- Qaem 114

Other Iranian satellite launch vehicles

- Safir (rocket)
- Simorgh (rocket)
- Qased (rocket)
- Zuljanah (rocket)
