= Nahid-1 =

Failed-to-launch Iranian Earth observation satellite

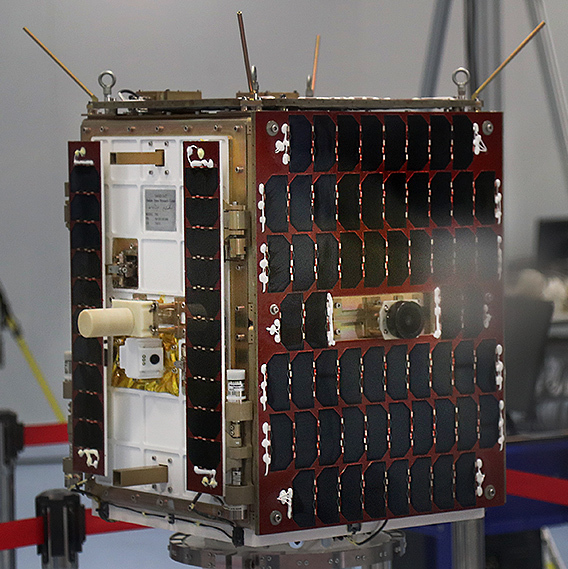
- Mission type: Communication
- Operator: Iranian Space Agency

Spacecraft properties
- Manufacturer: Iranian Space Agency
- Power: Solar

Start of mission
- Launch date: 4 March 2023
- Rocket: Qaem 100
- Launch site: Shahroud Space Center
- Contractor: IRGC

End of mission
- Disposal: launch vehicle failure
- Destroyed: 4 March 2023

Orbital parameters
- Reference system: Geocentric
- Regime: Low Earth

Nahid-1 (Persian: ناهید, meaning "Venus") was an Iranian solar-powered communications satellite.

== Satellite ==
It was originally planned to launch into low Earth orbit in September 2019 on a Safir rocket, however an explosion occurred on the launch pad during launch preparation on 29 August 2019, though the satellite itself was apparently not part of the test and remained undamaged. It was ultimately launched on board a Qaem 100 on 4 March 2023 as part of the rocket's maiden flight, however the launch failed and the satellite was destroyed together with the rocket.

Nahid-1 was built with the aim of gaining know-how and experience in the development of geosynchronous communication satellites. It was the first Iranian satellite equipped with deployable solar panels.

== See also ==
- Omid
- Kavoshgar 1 (rocket)
