= Noor (satellite) =

Iranian military satellite

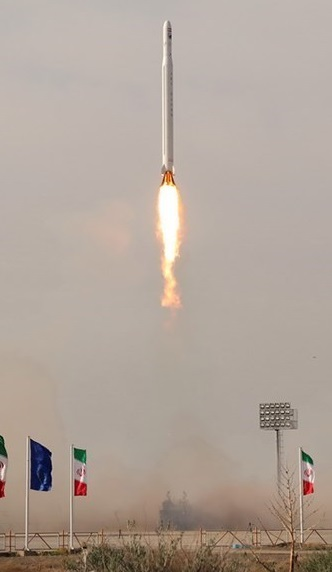
- Noor-1 is launched on board a Qased rocket
- Country of origin: Iran
- Operator: IRGC

Specifications
- Spacecraft type: Earth-imaging
- Bus: CubeSat (6U)
- Power: Solar cells, batteries
- Design life: 1 year

Production
- Built: 3
- Launched: 3
- Operational: 2
- Retired: 1
- Maiden launch: 22 April 2020
- Last launch: 27 September 2023

Noor (also spelled Nour, Persian: نور, lit. 'Light') is a class of Iranian military Earth-imaging CubeSat. Three Noor satellites have been launched from the Shahroud Space Center in Shahrud Desert in Iran into low Earth orbit aboard three-stage Qased (lit. 'message') space-launch vehicles.

Noor-1, the first Iranian military satellite, was launched on 22 April 2020 to a 425 kilometer orbit and decayed from orbit on 13 April 2022 marking a lifespan of one year, eleven months, and nine days, just past its expected one year service life. Noor-1 carried a photo of former Quds Force Commander Qassem Soleimani and a Quranic verse about overcoming adversaries.

Noor-2, the second satellite of the Noor class, was launched on 8 March 2022 (during the Sha'baniyah holiday) to a 500 kilometer orbit. It has a resolution of 12 to 15 meters, a weight of 17 kg, a swath width of 25 km and 6 passes. Noor-2 continues to provide the Islamic Revolutionary Guard Corps with low-resolution overhead imagery.

Noor-3, also called Najm is the third satellite of the Noor class, was launched on a Qassed launcher on 27 September 2023 to a 450 kilometer orbit. It has a weight of 24 kg with a resolution of 6 to 4.8 meters.

According to the Space Commander of the IRGC Aerospace Force, the Noor 3 satellite was stabilized in 1.5 hours and the process it took in the Noor 1 satellite was done automatically in 1 hour in the Noor 3 satellite.The camera used in Noor 3 satellite has up to 2.5 times better photo accuracy than Noor 2. He also added, "In the field of defense, we can use the satellite system for intelligence elites, command and control, and for guiding guided equipment".

The Noor satellite program is a unique development for Iran as it was the first satellite to be developed and launched by the IRGC instead of the Iranian Space Agency.

== Reaction ==
=== Iran ===
IRGC Commander-in-Chief General Hossein Salami remarked "Today, the world’s powerful armies do not have a comprehensive defense plan without being in space. Achieving this superior technology, which takes us into space and expands the realm of our abilities, is a strategic achievement."

=== United States ===
On April 22, 2020 U.S. Department of Defense acknowledged that Iran successfully launched its first military satellite.

Senior Pentagon officials called Iran's satellite launch a provocation. General John Hyten, vice chairman of the Joint Chiefs of Staff, stressed on the Qased satellite carrier technology, saying that "when you have a missile capable of going a very long way... it means that [Iran] has the ability once again to threaten their neighbors, our allies". The satellite itself, however, was dismissed by Space Force General John W. Raymond as "a tumbling webcam in space; unlikely providing intel."

Then President Donald Trump said that the satellite launch is not an advancement on the Iran's missile program and the showcasing "was only for television," while the US is watching Iran very closely.

=== France ===
The French Foreign Ministry condemned Iran's launch of a military satellite into orbit. Concurring with the United States' accusations that the same development would contribute to Iran's offensive ballistic missile program, the Foreign Ministry said "The Iranian ballistics program is a major concern for regional and international security. It contributes to the destabilization of the region and the rise in tensions."

=== Russia ===
Russia's Ambassador to the United Nations, Vasily Nebenzia, remarked to the international body "the ongoing attempts of the United States side to deprive Iran of the right to reap the benefits of peaceful space technology under false pretexts are a cause for serious concern and profound regret."

=== Other ===
Abdel Bari Atwan, the editor-in-chief of Rai al-Youm and Al Quds Al Arabi said that "Iran's recent launched military satellite to space will change the region's equations."

== Controversies ==
External image
- Doctored Google Earth image claimed by Fars as Noor imagery

On 29 July 2020, Iranian state-owned Fars News Agency published an article headlined "Al-Udeid Air Base Observed with Noor Satellite" claiming to show an overhead image of the United States' Al Udeid Air Base in Doha, Qatar "a gathering place for the CENTCOM terrorist air force" imaged by the Noor-1 satellite. Twitter open-source commentators suggested that the published image was a "recolored Maxar image from Google Earth".

== Operation ==
Noor satellites circle the Earth once every 90 minutes.

On 10 May 2022, Iranian Minister of Communication and Information Technology, Issa Zarepour published on his Instagram a low-resolution, true-color, overhead image of the U.S. Navy's Fifth Fleet Base in Bahrain taken from the Noor-2 satellite. The minister's account was banned from Instagram hours later.

Noor-class Satellites
English name	Persian Name	Launch Date	Altitude	Resolution	COSPAR	Operational Status
Noor-1	ماهواره نور ۱	22 April 2020	425 km	~20 m	2020-024A	Non-operational, decayed from orbit on 13 April 2022
Noor-2	ماهواره نور ۲	13 April 2022	500 km	~13 m	2022-024A	Operational
Noor-3	ماهواره نور ۳	27 September 2023	450 km	~5 m	2023-150A	Operational
