= Shahroud Space Center =

Iranian space launch center

Sharoud Space Center
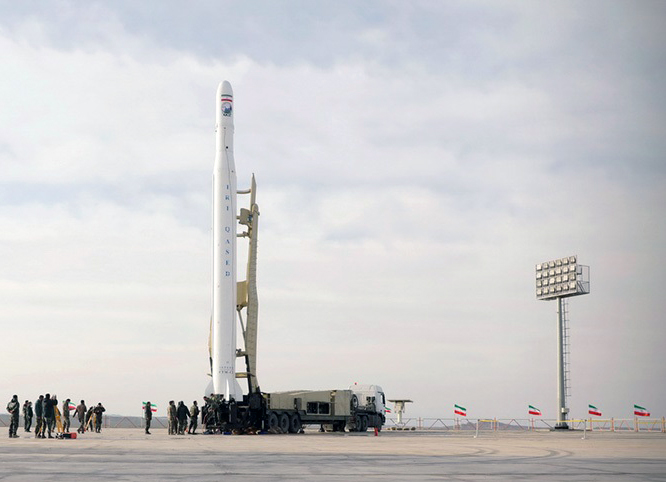

Site information
- Type: Spaceport
- Operator: IRGCASF
- Condition: Operational

Location
- Location within Iran
- Coordinates: 36.2009°N 55.3339°E

Site history
- Built: late 1980s

Shahroud Space Center (Persian:پایگاه فضایی شاهرود) is a Military Spaceport under control of the Islamic Revolutionary Guard Corps Aerospace Force (IRGCASF) located south-east of Shahroud Semnan Province, used to orbit military satellites for Iran's military space program.According to the International Institute for Strategic Studies, the Israel Defense Forces struck the Shahrud Space Center during the October 2024 Israeli strikes on Iran and the Twelve-Day War. The facility was ultimately targeted again during the 2026 Iran war., in attacks carried out between 6 and 10 March 2026, and a large part of it was destroyed.

== Overview ==
The launch of the Noor 1 satellite on April 22, 2020, using the Qased launch vehicle out of Shahroud space center revealed the existence of a parallel military space program run by the IRGC as opposed to Iran's civil space program run by the Iranian Space Agency (ISA).

The site features a 23-meter-tall servicing tower, a concrete launch pad 200 by 140 meters and an exhaust deflector with a length of 125 meters; Interestingly, the site features no storage facilities and fuel tanks for liquid rocket propellant, and is primarily designed to launch solid fueled launch vehicles such as the Qaem.

== Launch history ==
Launch #	Date	Launch Vehicle	Payload	Outcome	Notes
1	22 April 2020	Qased	Noor 1	Success	Iran's first military satellite
2	8 March 2022	Qased	Noor 2	Success	Iran's second military satellite
3	5 November 2022	Qaem 100	N/A	Success	First sub-orbital test
4	4 March 2023	Qaem 100	Nahid-1	Failure	First Qaem 100 orbital launch attempt
5	27 September 2023	Qased	Noor 3	Success	Iran's third military satellite
6	20 January 2024	Qaem 100	Soraya	Success	Research satellite for the Iranian Space Agency
7	14 September 2024	Qaem 100	Chamran 1	Success	
8	20 July 2025	Qased		Success	Suborbital test flight

== See also ==
- Qased (rocket)
- IRGCASF
- Semnan Space Center
