= Qased (rocket) =

Iranian satellite expendable launch vehicle

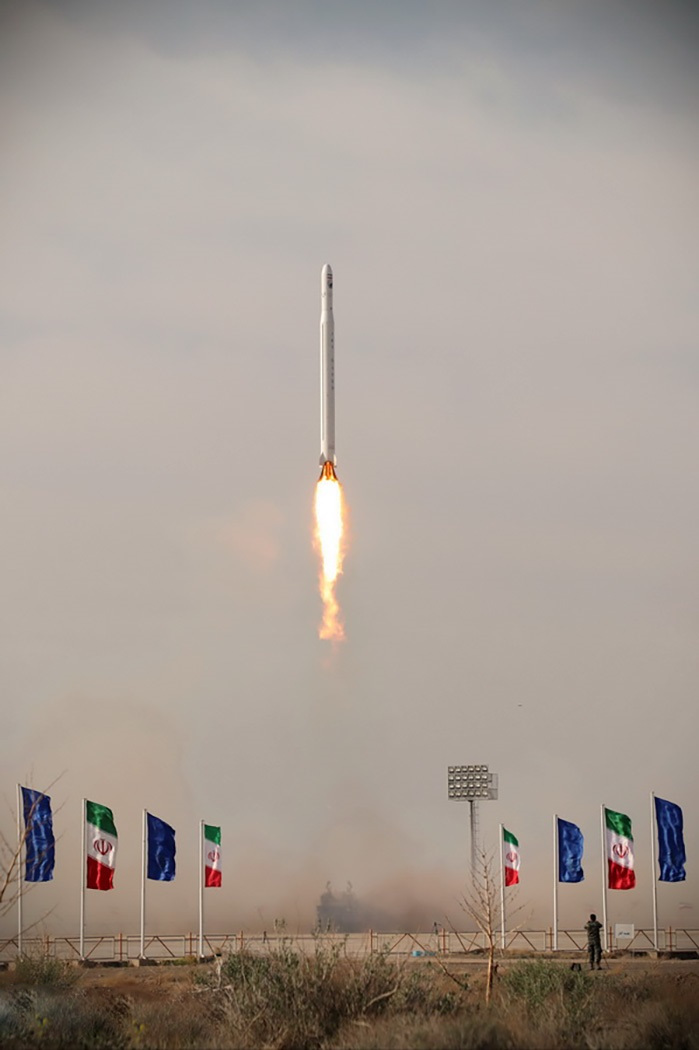
- Function: Small-lift space launch vehicle
- Manufacturer: Islamic Revolutionary Guard Corps
- Country of origin: Iran

Size
- Height: 18.6 m (61 ft)
- Diameter: 1.25 m (4 ft 1 in)

Payload to LEO (500 km)
- Mass: 40 kg
- Stages: 3

Associated rockets
- Family: Developed into Qaem 100

Launch history
- Status: Active
- Launch sites: Shahroud space center
- Total launches: 4 (1 suborbital)
- Success(es): 4 (1 suborbital)
- Failure: 0
- First flight: 22 April 2020
- Last flight: 20 July 2025

First stage
- Diameter: 1.25 m
- Powered by: Ghadr
- Maximum thrust: ~ 32,000 kilograms-force (310,000 N; 71,000 lbf)
- Burn time: 118 seconds
- Propellant: UDMH/N2O4

Second stage
- Diameter: 1 m
- Powered by: Salman
- Burn time: 60 seconds
- Propellant: solid

Third stage
- Diameter: 1 m
- Powered by: Unnamed IRGC motor
- Propellant: solid

The Qased (also Ghased, Persian: قاصد, lit. 'messenger') rocket is an Iranian expendable small-lift orbital space launch vehicle. It made its maiden flight in 2020, lofting Iran's first military satellite named Noor (Persian: نور, lit. 'light') into orbit.

== Design ==
Qased is a three-stage rocket. Its first stage is propelled by a Ghadr medium range ballistic missile with a diameter of 1.25 meters (4 ft 1 in), burning UDMH and N_{2}O_{4} for 103 seconds and an approximate thrust of 32,000 kilograms-force (310 kN; 71,000 lbf). However, Qased's application of the proven Ghadr as its first stage is limited to the first launches, and subsequent launches are to utilize a solid-fueled first stage. The 1 meter (3 ft 3 in) diameter second stage is the solid fueled Salman with a lightweight carbon fiber composite casing, a flexible nozzle with thrust vectoring capability, and a burn time of 60 seconds. The third stage was erroneously believed to be a Saman-1 upper stage with an Arash-24 solid fuel motor with a burn time of 40 seconds.

== Strategic implications ==
The launcher is notable as it is operated by the IRGC Air Force rather than the Iranian Space Agency (ISA) and is small enough to be launched from a transporter erector launcher. The launch unveiled a full-blown parallel military space program separate from the ISA, with separate development paths and solid fueled launch vehicles, as opposed to the ISA's liquid fueled rockets.

In terms of the Noor satellite itself, the launch does not fundamentally change the security equations in the Middle East; however, the unveiling of the IRGC space program and its emphasis towards solid fueled launch vehicles (which are more military viable than Iran's previous liquid fueled launchers like the Simorgh) might indicate Iran's hedging strategy to acquire ICBM technology without the security repercussions of openly attempting to do so.

== Launch history ==
Flight No.	Date & time (UTC)	Payload	Type	Outcome	Remarks
1	22 April 2020, 04:00	Noor	Reconnaissance Satellite	Success	444 x 426 km orbit, 59.8 degree inclination
2	8 March 2022, 05:06	Noor 2	Reconnaissance Satellite	Success	495 x 513 km orbit, 58.3 degree inclination
3	27 September 2023, 06:00	Noor 3	Reconnaissance Satellite	Success	442 x 456 km orbit, 60.0 degree inclination
4	20 July 2025	No payload		Success	Suborbital test flight

== Gallery ==
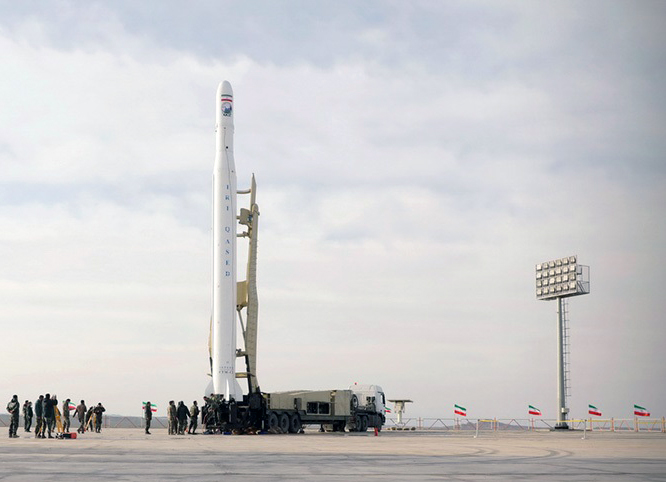
Qased during preparations on the launch pad

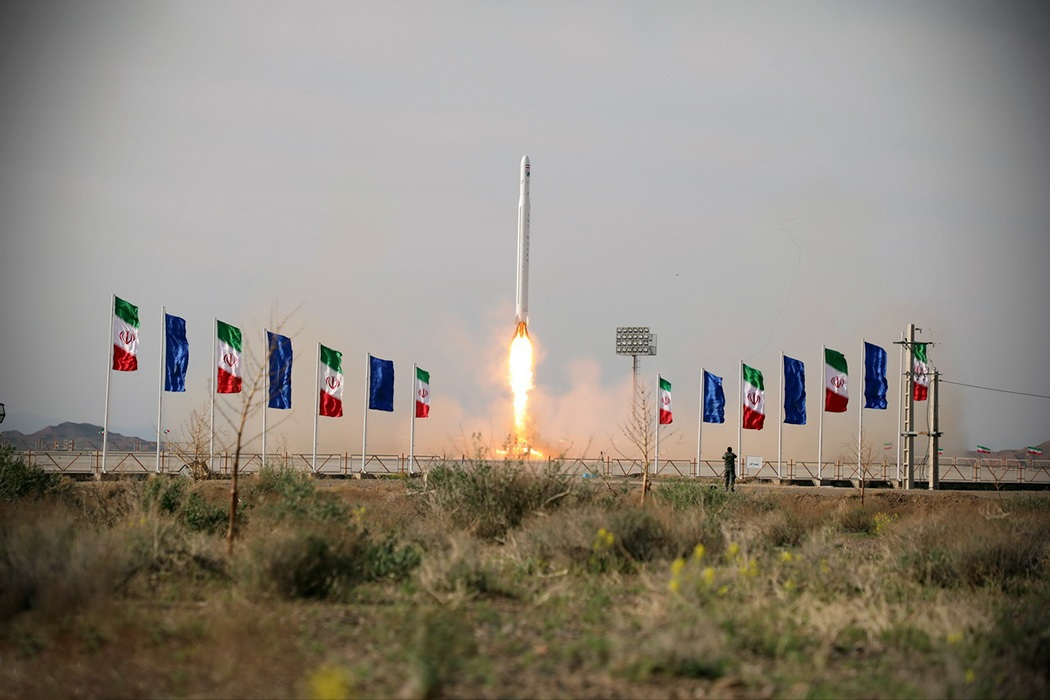
Qased lifting off

== See also ==
- IRGC Aerospace Force
- Salman (rocket stage)
- Noor (satellite)
- Shahroud Space Center

Other Iranian satellite launch vehicles:

- Safir (rocket)
- Simorgh (rocket)
- Zuljanah (rocket)
- Qaem-100 (rocket)
