= List of spaceflight launches in January–June 2022 =

This article lists orbital and suborbital launches during the first half of the year 2022.

For all other spaceflight activities, see 2022 in spaceflight. For launches in the second half of 2022, see List of spaceflight launches in July–December 2022.

== Orbital launches ==
- ← Jan
- Feb
- Mar
- Apr
- May
- Jun
- Jul
- Aug
- Sep
- Oct
- Nov
- Dec →

Date and time (UTC)	Rocket	Flight number	Launch site		LSP	
Date and time (UTC)	Payload (⚀ = CubeSat)	Operator	Orbit	Function	Decay (UTC)	Outcome
Date and time (UTC)	Remarks					
=== January ===
6 January; 21:49:10	(United States) Falcon 9 Block 5	Starlink Group 4-5	(United States) Kennedy LC-39A		(United States) SpaceX	
6 January; 21:49:10	(United States) Starlink × 49	SpaceX	Low Earth	Communications	In orbit	Operational
13 January; 15:25:39	(United States) Falcon 9 Block 5	Transporter-3	(United States) Cape Canaveral SLC-40		(United States) SpaceX	
13 January; 15:25:39	(Italy) ION SCV-004 Elysian Eleonora	D-Orbit	Low Earth (SSO)	CubeSat deployer	In orbit	Operational
13 January; 15:25:39	(United States) Capella 7 (Whitney 5)	Capella Space	Low Earth (SSO)	Earth observation	26 August 2023	Successful
13 January; 15:25:39	(United States) Capella 8 (Whitney 6)	Capella Space	Low Earth (SSO)	Earth observation	6 September 2023	Successful
13 January; 15:25:39	(Finland) ICEYE X14	ICEYE	Low Earth (SSO)	Earth observation	6 January 2026	Successful
13 January; 15:25:39	(Finland) ICEYE X16	ICEYE	Low Earth (SSO)	Earth observation	16 September 2024	Successful
13 January; 15:25:39	(Ukraine) Sich-2-30 (2-1)	SSAU	Low Earth (SSO)	Earth observation	8 October 2025	Successful
13 January; 15:25:39	(United States) Umbra-02	Umbra Space	Low Earth (SSO)	Earth observation	8 November 2024	Successful
13 January; 15:25:39	(United States) USA-320, 321, 322, 323	TBA	Low Earth (SSO)	TBA	USA-320: 28 November 2024; USA-321: 1 April 2023; USA-322: 2 April 2023; USA-323: 2 April 2023	Successful
13 January; 15:25:39	⚀ (France) BRO-5	UnseenLabs	Low Earth (SSO)	SIGINT	In orbit	Operational
13 January; 15:25:39	⚀ (United States) Dodona (La Jument)	USC / Lockheed Martin	Low Earth (SSO)	Technology demonstration	23 May 2024	Successful
13 January; 15:25:39	⚀ (United Arab Emirates) DEWASAT-1	DEWA	Low Earth (SSO)	Technology demonstration	30 October 2024	Successful
13 January; 15:25:39	⚀ (United Kingdom) ETV-A1	Sen	Low Earth (SSO)	Earth observation UHD streaming	In orbit	Operational
13 January; 15:25:39	⚀ (United States) Flock 4x × 44	Planet Labs	Low Earth (SSO)	Earth observation	First: 9 March 2024; Last: 6 November 2024	Successful
13 January; 15:25:39	⚀ (Germany) FOREST-1 (OroraTech 1)	OroraTech	Low Earth (SSO)	Wildfire monitoring	3 August 2024	Successful
13 January; 15:25:39	⚀ (United States) Gossamer-Piccolomini	LunaSonde	Low Earth (SSO)	Technology demonstration	Unknown	Successful
13 January; 15:25:39	⚀ (Norway) HYPSO-1	NTNU SmallSat Lab	Low Earth (SSO)	Earth observation	In orbit	Operational
13 January; 15:25:39	⚀ (Taiwan) IRIS-A	National Cheng Kung University	Low Earth (SSO)	Technology demonstration	10 June 2025	Successful
13 January; 15:25:39	⚀ (Canada) Kepler × 4	Kepler	Low Earth (SSO)	Communications	First: 26 August 2024; Last: 2 April 2025	Successful
13 January; 15:25:39	⚀ (Poland) LabSat	SatRevolution	Low Earth (SSO)	Technology demonstration	10 September 2024	Successful
13 January; 15:25:39	⚀ (United States) Lemur-2 × 2	Spire Global	Low Earth (SSO)	Earth observation SIGINT	Ramonmae: 29 May 2024; King-Julien: 19 January 2024	Successful
13 January; 15:25:39	⚀ (United States) Lemur-2-Djirang	Spire Global	Low Earth (SSO)	Earth observation SIGINT	29 June 2024	Successful
13 January; 15:25:39	⚀ (United States) Lemur-2-Miriwari	Spire Global	Low Earth (SSO)	Earth observation SIGINT	29 June 2024	Successful
13 January; 15:25:39	⚀ (South Africa) MDASat-1 × 3	CPUT	Low Earth (SSO)	AIS tracking	First: 28 February 2025; Last: 13 May 2025	Successful
13 January; 15:25:39	⚀ (Singapore) NuX-1	NuSpace	Low Earth (SSO)	IoT	Unknown	Successful
13 January; 15:25:39	⚀ (Poland) STORK-1, 2	SatRevolution	Low Earth (SSO)	Earth observation	STORK-1: 29 April 2024; STORK-2: 4 May 2024	Successful
13 January; 15:25:39	⚀ (Poland) SW1FT	SatRevolution	Low Earth (SSO)	Earth observation	2 May 2024	Successful
13 January; 15:25:39	⚀ (Israel) Tevel × 8	Herzliya Science Center	Low Earth (SSO)	Amateur radio Education	First: 18 July 2024; Last: 5 August 2024	Successful
13 January; 15:25:39	⚀ (Czech Republic) VZLUSAT-2	VZLU Aerospace	Low Earth (SSO)	Technology demonstration	30 November 2025	Successful
13 January; 15:25:39	(Spain) FOSSA PocketPOD × 2	FOSSA Systems	Low Earth (SSO)	PocketQube dispenser	Unknown	Successful
13 January; 15:25:39	▫ (United States) Challenger	Quub (Mini-Cubes)	Low Earth (SSO)	Earth observation	4 April 2023	Successful
13 January; 15:25:39	▫ (Italy) CShark Pilot-1 (FossaSat-2E3)	CShark	Low Earth (SSO)	IoT	12 September 2023	Successful
13 January; 15:25:39	▫ (Netherlands) Delfi-PQ	Technical University of Delft	Low Earth (SSO)	LOFAR technology demonstration	9 January 2024	Successful
13 January; 15:25:39	▫ (Spain) EASAT-2	AMSAT EA	Low Earth (SSO)	Amateur radio	23 May 2024	Successful
13 January; 15:25:39	▫ (Spain) FOSSASAT-2E5, 2E6	FOSSA Systems	Low Earth (SSO)	IoT	2E5: 3 June 2023; 2E6: 29 June 2023	Successful
13 January; 15:25:39	▫ (Turkey) Grizu-263a	Zonguldak Bülent Ecevit University	Low Earth (SSO)	Education	3 October 2023	Successful
13 January; 15:25:39	▫ (Spain) HADES	AMSAT EA	Low Earth (SSO)	Amateur radio	27 May 2024	Successful
13 January; 15:25:39	▫ (Sweden) LAIKA (FOSSASAT-2E4, FOSSASAT-2B)	Porkchop	Low Earth (SSO)	Technology demonstration	16 May 2023	Successful
13 January; 15:25:39	▫ (Argentina) MDQube-SAT1	Innova Space	Low Earth (SSO)	Technology demonstration	Unknown	Successful
13 January; 15:25:39	▫ (Brazil) PION-BR1	PION Labs	Low Earth (SSO)	Technology demonstration	Unknown	Successful
13 January; 15:25:39	▫ (Nepal) SanoSat-1	ORION Space	Low Earth (SSO)	Amateur radio	7 February 2024	Successful
13 January; 15:25:39	▫ (Israel) SATTLA-2A, 2B	Ariel University	Low Earth (SSO)	Education	2A: 25 June 2023; 2B: 1 November 2023	Successful
13 January; 15:25:39	▫ (United States) Tartan-Artibeus-1 (Unicorn-2TA1)	CMU / Alba Orbital	Low Earth (SSO)	Technology demonstration	Unknown	Successful
13 January; 15:25:39	▫ (Germany) Unicorn 1	Alba Orbital UG / ESA	Low Earth (SSO)	Inter-satellite link technology demonstration	23 December 2024	Successful
13 January; 15:25:39	▫ (Germany) Unicorn-2A, 2D, 2E	Alba Orbital UG	Low Earth (SSO)	Earth observation	2D: 13 April 2023; 2A/2E: unknown	Successful
13 January; 15:25:39	▫ (Switzerland) WISeSAT-1 (FossaSat-2E1)	WISeKey	Low Earth (SSO)	IoT	23 June 2023	Successful
13 January; 15:25:39	▫ (Switzerland) WISeSAT-2 (FossaSat-2E2)	WISeKey	Low Earth (SSO)	IoT	Unknown	Successful
13 January; 15:25:39	Dedicated SmallSat Rideshare mission to Sun-synchronous orbit, designated Transporter-3. The USA-320, 321, 322 and 323 were likely built by SpaceX based on the Starshield bus (based on Starlink Block v1.5 technology) and deployed by the US army. Their purpose has not been revealed.					
13 January; 22:51:39	(United States) LauncherOne	"Above the Clouds"	(United States) Cosmic Girl, Mojave		(United States) Virgin Orbit	
13 January; 22:51:39	⚀ (Austria) Lemur-2-Krywe (ADLER-1)	Austrian Space Forum	Low Earth	Space debris measurement	13 January 2022	Successful
13 January; 22:51:39	⚀ (United States) GEARRS-3	Air Force Research Center	Low Earth	Technology demonstration	7 August 2024	Successful
13 January; 22:51:39	⚀ (United States) PAN-A, B	Cornell University	Low Earth	Technology demonstration	In orbit	Operational
13 January; 22:51:39	⚀ (United Kingdom) SteamSat-2	SteamJet Space Systems	Low Earth	Technology demonstration	26 September 2023	Successful
13 January; 22:51:39	⚀ (Poland) STORK-3	SatRevolution	Low Earth	Earth observation	29 August 2023	Successful
13 January; 22:51:39	⚀ (United States) TechEdSat-13	Ames Research Center	Low Earth	Technology demonstration	13 July 2024	Successful
13 January; 22:51:39	STP-27VPB mission (ELaNa 29, GEARRS-3, and TechEdSat-3) for the Defense Innovation Unit. The ELaNa 29 mission consists of two CubeSats (PAN-A and PAN-B) that will autonomously rendezvous and dock in low Earth orbit.					
17 January; 02:35	(China) Long March 2D	2D-Y70	(China) Taiyuan LC-9		(China) CASC	
17 January; 02:35	(China) Shiyan 13	CAS	Low Earth (SSO)	Technology demonstration	In orbit	Operational
19 January; 02:02:40	(United States) Falcon 9 Block 5	Starlink Group 4-6	(United States) Kennedy LC-39A		(United States) SpaceX	
19 January; 02:02:40	(United States) Starlink × 49	SpaceX	Low Earth	Communications	In orbit	Operational
21 January; 19:00:00	(United States) Atlas V 511	AV-084	(United States) Cape Canaveral SLC-41		(United States) ULA	
21 January; 19:00:00	(United States) GSSAP-5 (USA-324)	United States Space Force	Geosynchronous	Space surveillance	In orbit	Operational
21 January; 19:00:00	(United States) GSSAP-6 (USA-325)	United States Space Force	Geosynchronous	Space surveillance	In orbit	Operational
21 January; 19:00:00	USSF-8 mission. First and only flight of the 511 configuration for Atlas V.					
25 January; 23:44	(China) Long March 4C	4C-Y29	(China) Jiuquan SLS-2		(China) CASC	
25 January; 23:44	(China) Ludi Tance-1 01A (L-SAR 01A)	Ministry of Natural Resources	Low Earth (SSO)	Earth observation	24 January 2026; 06:32	Successful
31 January; 23:11:14	(United States) Falcon 9 Block 5	F9-138	(United States) Cape Canaveral SLC-40		(United States) SpaceX	
31 January; 23:11:14	(Italy) CSG-2	ASI	Low Earth (SSO)	Earth observation	In orbit	Operational
31 January; 23:11:14	Second COSMO-SkyMed 2nd Generation satellite.					
← Jan; Feb; Mar; Apr; May; Jun; Jul; Aug; Sep; Oct; Nov; Dec →; === February ===
2 February; 20:27:26	(United States) Falcon 9 Block 5	F9-139	(United States) Vandenberg SLC-4E		(United States) SpaceX	
2 February; 20:27:26	(United States) USA-326	NRO	Low Earth (SSO)	Reconnaissance	In orbit	Operational
2 February; 20:27:26	NROL-87 Mission					
3 February; 18:13:20	(United States) Falcon 9 Block 5	Starlink Group 4-7	(United States) Kennedy LC-39A		(United States) SpaceX	
3 February; 18:13:20	(United States) Starlink × 49	SpaceX	Low Earth	Communications	In orbit	Operational (11/49)
3 February; 18:13:20	A geomagnetic storm on 4 February 2022 significantly increased atmospheric drag at the deployment altitude of these satellites, resulting in 38 of them reentering the atmosphere over the following eight days.					
5 February; 07:00:00	(Russia) Soyuz-2.1a / Fregat		(Russia) Plesetsk Site 43/4		(Russia) RVSN RF	
5 February; 07:00:00	(Russia) Neitron №1 (Kosmos-2553)	Ministry of Defence	Low Earth	Reconnaissance	In orbit	Operational
10 February; 18:09:37	(Russia) Soyuz ST-B / Fregat-MT	VS27	(France) Kourou ELS		(France) Arianespace	
10 February; 18:09:37	(United Kingdom) OneWeb × 34	OneWeb	Low Earth	Communications	In orbit	Operational
10 February; 20:00	(United States) Rocket 3.3	LV0008	(United States) Cape Canaveral SLC-46		(United States) Astra	
10 February; 20:00	⚀ (United States) BAMA-1	University of Alabama	Low Earth	Technology demonstration	10 February	Launch failure
10 February; 20:00	⚀ (United States) INCA	NMSU	Low Earth	Ionospheric research	10 February	Launch failure
10 February; 20:00	⚀ (United States) QubeSat	UC Berkeley	Low Earth	Quantum gyroscope	10 February	Launch failure
10 February; 20:00	⚀ (United States) R5-S1	Johnson Space Center	Low Earth	Technology demonstration	10 February	Launch failure
10 February; 20:00	First launch by Astra from Cape Canaveral Space Force Station. NASA Venture Class Launch Services 2 (VCLS 2) Mission One, officially known as VCLS Demo-2A. The ELaNa 41 mission, consisting of four CubeSats, was manifested on this flight. Launch was the first approved via an FAA Part 450 launch license. An anomaly occurred around second stage ignition, resulting in a loss of mission; the failure was later found to have been caused by a wiring error in the separation mechanism and a software flaw in the thrust vector system.					
14 February; 00:29	(India) PSLV-XL	C52	(India) Satish Dhawan FLP		(India) ISRO	
14 February; 00:29	(India) EOS-04 (RISAT-1A)	ISRO	Low Earth (SSO)	Earth observation	In orbit	Operational
14 February; 00:29	⚀ (United States) (India) (Taiwan) (Singapore) INSPIRESat-1	LASP / IIST / NCU / NTU	Low Earth (SSO)	Ionospheric research	In orbit	Operational
14 February; 00:29	⚀ (India) INS-2TD	ISRO	Low Earth (SSO)	Technology demonstration	In orbit	Operational
15 February; 04:25:39	(Russia) Soyuz-2.1a		(Kazakhstan) Baikonur Site 31/6		(Russia) Roscosmos	
15 February; 04:25:39	(Russia) Progress MS-19 / 80P	Roscosmos	Low Earth (ISS)	ISS logistics	24 October; 01:51	Successful
15 February; 04:25:39	⚀ (Russia) YuZGU-55 (RadioSkaf) 5–10	South-West State University	Low Earth (ISS)	Technology demonstration	YuZGU-55 8: 27 January 2023; 5–7, 9–10: 31 January 2023	Successful
19 February; 17:40:03	(United States) Antares 230+		(United States) MARS LP-0A		(United States) Northrop Grumman	
19 February; 17:40:03	(United States) Cygnus NG-17; S.S. Piers Sellers	NASA	Low Earth (ISS)	ISS logistics	29 June; 08:20	Successful
19 February; 17:40:03	⚀ (Japan) IHI-SAT	IHI	Low Earth	Technology demonstration	18 November	Successful
19 February; 17:40:03	⚀ (Japan) (Paraguay) KITSUNE	Kyutech / AEP	Low Earth	Technology demonstration	14 March 2023	Successful
19 February; 17:40:03	⚀ (United States) NACHOS	LANL	Low Earth	Technology demonstration	3 February 2023	Successful
19 February; 17:40:03	The ELaNa 44 mission, consisting of one CubeSat (NACHOS), was launched on this flight. IHI-SAT and KITSUNE were deployed into orbit from the ISS on 24 March 2022.					
21 February; 14:44:20	(United States) Falcon 9 Block 5	Starlink Group 4-8	(United States) Cape Canaveral SLC-40		(United States) SpaceX	
21 February; 14:44:20	(United States) Starlink × 46	SpaceX	Low Earth	Communications	In orbit	Operational
25 February; 17:12:10	(United States) Falcon 9 Block 5	Starlink Group 4-11	(United States) Vandenberg SLC-4E		(United States) SpaceX	
25 February; 17:12:10	(United States) Starlink × 50	SpaceX	Low Earth	Communications	In orbit	Operational
26 February; 23:44	(China) Long March 4C	4C-Y30	(China) Jiuquan SLS-2		(China) CASC	
26 February; 23:44	(China) Ludi Tance-1 01B (L-SAR 01B)	Ministry of Natural Resources	Low Earth (SSO)	Earth observation	In orbit	Operational
27 February; 03:06	(China) Long March 8	Y2	(China) Wenchang LC-2		(China) CASC	
27 February; 03:06	(China) Dayun (Xingshidai-17)	ADA Space	Low Earth (SSO)	Earth observation	In orbit	Operational
27 February; 03:06	(China) Hainan-1 01, 02	Hainan Westar	Low Earth (SSO)	Earth observation	In orbit	Operational
27 February; 03:06	(China) Jilin-1 Gaofen-03D 10–14	Chang Guang Satellite Technology	Low Earth (SSO)	Earth observation	In orbit	Operational
27 February; 03:06	(China) Jilin-1 Gaofen-03D 15 (Shaoguan-1)	Chang Guang Satellite Technology	Low Earth (SSO)	Earth observation	In orbit	Operational
27 February; 03:06	(China) Jilin-1 Gaofen-03D 16 (Wenchang Chaosuan-2)	Chang Guang Satellite Technology	Low Earth (SSO)	Earth observation	In orbit	Operational
27 February; 03:06	(China) Jilin-1 Gaofen-03D 17 (Wenchang Chaosuan-3)	Chang Guang Satellite Technology	Low Earth (SSO)	Earth observation	In orbit	Operational
27 February; 03:06	(China) Jilin-1 Gaofen-03D 18 (Anxi Tieguanyin-1)	Chang Guang Satellite Technology	Low Earth (SSO)	Earth observation	In orbit	Operational
27 February; 03:06	(China) Jilin-1 Mofang-02A 01 (Xiamen-1)	Chang Guang Satellite Technology	Low Earth (SSO)	Technology demonstration	In orbit	Operational
27 February; 03:06	(China) Qimingxing-1	Wuhan University	Low Earth (SSO)	Earth observation	In orbit	Operational
27 February; 03:06	(China) Taijing-3 01	MinoSpace	Low Earth (SSO)	Earth observation	In orbit	Operational
27 February; 03:06	(China) Taijing-4 01	MinoSpace	Low Earth (SSO)	Earth observation	In orbit	Operational
27 February; 03:06	(China) Thor Smart Satellite (Chuangxing Leishen)	Spacety	Low Earth (SSO)	Astronomy	In orbit	Operational
27 February; 03:06	(China) Tianxian-1 (Chaohu-1)	Spacety	Low Earth (SSO)	Earth observation	In orbit	Operational
27 February; 03:06	(China) Wenchang-1 01, 02	Sanya Institute of Remote Sensing (institute of Chinese Academy of Sciences) / Hainan Westar	Low Earth (SSO)	Earth observation	In orbit	Operational
27 February; 03:06	(China) Xidian-1 (XD-1)	Shaanxi Silk Road Tiantu / MinoSpace	Low Earth (SSO)	Earth observation	In orbit	Operational
27 February; 03:06	⚀ (China) Tianqi-19	Guodian Gaoke	Low Earth (SSO)	IoT	In orbit	Operational
27 February; 03:06	Second Long March Express commercial rideshare mission, carrying 22 satellites.					
28 February; 20:37:25	(United States) Electron	"The Owl's Night Continues"	(New Zealand) Māhia LC-1B		(United States) Rocket Lab	
28 February; 20:37:25	(Japan) StriX-β	Synspective	Low Earth (SSO)	Earth observation	In orbit	Operational
28 February; 20:37:25	Second of 16 dedicated launches for Synspective's StriX constellation. First launch from Pad B at Rocket Lab Launch Complex 1 in Māhia.					
← Jan; Feb; Mar; Apr; May; Jun; Jul; Aug; Sep; Oct; Nov; Dec →; === March ===
1 March; 21:38:00	(United States) Atlas V 541	AV-095	(United States) Cape Canaveral SLC-41		(United States) ULA	
1 March; 21:38:00	(United States) GOES-18 (GOES-T)	NOAA / NASA	Geosynchronous	Meteorology	In orbit	Operational
3 March; 14:25:00	(United States) Falcon 9 Block 5	Starlink Group 4-9	(United States) Kennedy LC-39A		(United States) SpaceX	
3 March; 14:25:00	(United States) Starlink × 47	SpaceX	Low Earth	Communications	In orbit	Operational
5 March; 06:01	(China) Long March 2C	2C-Y62	(China) Xichang LC-3		(China) CASC	
5 March; 06:01	(China) Yinhe Hangtian-2 × 6 (01–06)	GalaxySpace	Low Earth	5G communications	In orbit	Operational
5 March; 06:01	⚀ (China) Xuanming Xingyuan	SpaceWish	Low Earth	Earth observation	In orbit	Operational
5 March; 06:01	Rideshare mission.					
8 March ≈05:06	(Iran) Qased		(Iran) Shahroud Space Center		(Iran) IRGC	
8 March ≈05:06	⚀ (Iran) Noor-2	IRGC	Low Earth	Reconnaissance	In orbit	Operational
9 March; 13:45:10	(United States) Falcon 9 Block 5	Starlink Group 4-10	(United States) Cape Canaveral SLC-40		(United States) SpaceX	
9 March; 13:45:10	(United States) Starlink × 48	SpaceX	Low Earth	Communications	In orbit	Operational
15 March; 16:22	(United States) Rocket 3.3	LV0009	(United States) Kodiak LP-3B		(United States) Astra	
15 March; 16:22	(United States) S4 Crossover (EyeStar-S4)	NearSpace Launch	Low Earth (SSO)	Technology demonstration	2 January 2024	Successful
15 March; 16:22	⚀ (United States) OreSat0	Portland State Aerospace Society	Low Earth (SSO)	Technology demonstration	In orbit	Operational
15 March; 16:22	⚀ (United States) SpaceBEE × 16	Swarm Technologies	Low Earth (SSO)	Communications	In orbit	Operational
15 March; 16:22	⚀ (New Zealand) SpaceBEE NZ × 4	Swarm Technologies	Low Earth (SSO)	Communications	First: 8 November 2023; Last: 13 December 2023	Successful
15 March; 16:22	This mission for Spaceflight, Inc. was designated Astra-1. S4 Crossover remained attached to the second stage as intended. 22 total payloads.					
17 March; 07:09	(China) Long March 4C	4C-Y47	(China) Jiuquan SLS-2		(China) CASC	
17 March; 07:09	(China) Yaogan 34-02	CAS	Low Earth	Reconnaissance	In orbit	Operational
18 March; 15:55:18	(Russia) Soyuz-2.1a		(Kazakhstan) Baikonur Site 31/6		(Russia) Roscosmos	
18 March; 15:55:18	(Russia) Soyuz MS-21	Roscosmos	Low Earth (ISS)	Expedition 66/67	29 September; 10:57	Successful
19 March; 04:42:30	(United States) Falcon 9 Block 5	Starlink Group 4-12	(United States) Cape Canaveral SLC-40		(United States) SpaceX	
19 March; 04:42:30	(United States) Starlink × 53	SpaceX	Low Earth	Communications	In orbit	Operational
22 March; 12:48:22	(Russia) Soyuz-2.1a / Fregat		(Russia) Plesetsk Site 43/4		(Russia) RVSN RF	
22 March; 12:48:22	(Russia) Meridian-M 10 (20L)	Ministry of Defence	Molniya	Communications	In orbit	Operational
29 March; 09:50	(China) Long March 6A	6A-Y1	(China) Taiyuan LC-9A		(China) CASC	
29 March; 09:50	(China) Pujiang-2	CASC	Low Earth (SSO)	Earth observation	In orbit	Operational
29 March; 09:50	(China) Tiankun-2	CASIC	Low Earth (SSO)	Technology demonstration	In orbit	Operational
29 March; 09:50	Maiden flight of Long March 6A, China's first rocket with solid rocket boosters. The vehicle is a further development of the Long March 6, with 2 YF-100 engines on the first stage as opposed to 1 on the Long March 6, augmented by 4 solid rocket boosters. It was also the first launch from the newly built launch complex 9A in Taiyuan.					
30 March; 02:29	(China) Long March 11	Y10	(China) Jiuquan LS-95B		(China) CASC	
30 March; 02:29	(China) Tianping-2A	CASIC	Low Earth (SSO)	Radar calibration	In orbit	Operational
30 March; 02:29	(China) Tianping-2B	CASIC	Low Earth (SSO)	Atmospheric research	In orbit	Operational
30 March; 02:29	(China) Tianping-2C	CASIC	Low Earth (SSO)	Atmospheric research	In orbit	Operational
← Jan; Feb; Mar; Apr; May; Jun; Jul; Aug; Sep; Oct; Nov; Dec →; === April ===
1 April; 16:24:16	(United States) Falcon 9 Block 5	Transporter-4	(United States) Cape Canaveral SLC-40		(United States) SpaceX	
1 April; 16:24:16	(Italy) ION SCV-005 Almighty Alexius	D-Orbit	Low Earth (SSO)	CubeSat deployer	6 August 2024	Successful
1 April; 16:24:16	(Germany) EnMAP	DLR / GFZ	Low Earth (SSO)	Earth observation	In orbit	Operational
1 April; 16:24:16	(United States) GNOMES-3	PlanetIQ	Low Earth (SSO)	Radio occultation	In orbit	Operational
1 April; 16:24:16	(United States) Hawk 4A, 4B, 4C	HawkEye 360	Low Earth (SSO)	SIGINT	First: 30 August 2025; Last: 1 September 2025	Successful
1 April; 16:24:16	(United States) Lynk Tower 01 (Lynk 05)	Lynk Global	Low Earth (SSO)	Communications	12 March 2026	Successful
1 April; 16:24:16	(United States) (Luxembourg) MP42 / Tiger-3	NanoAvionics / OQ Technology	Low Earth (SSO)	IoT	20 October 2024	Successful
1 April; 16:24:16	(Argentina) ÑuSat × 5	Satellogic	Low Earth (SSO)	Earth observation	In orbit	Operational
1 April; 16:24:16	⚀ (Brazil) AlfaCrux	University of Brasília	Low Earth (SSO)	Communication	5 April 2024	Successful
1 April; 16:24:16	⚀ (Norway) ARCSAT	FFI	Low Earth (SSO)	Technology demonstration	In orbit	Operational
1 April; 16:24:16	⚀ (France) BRO-7	UnseenLabs	Low Earth (SSO)	SIGINT	28 June 2025	Successful
1 April; 16:24:16	⚀ (Czech Republic) BDSAT	CEITEC	Low Earth (SSO)	Amateur radio	18 April 2024	Successful
1 April; 16:24:16	⚀ (United States) Omnispace Spark-1 (LEO-1)	Omnispace	Low Earth (SSO)	IoT	In orbit	Operational
1 April; 16:24:16	⚀ (Luxembourg) Patrol Mission (KSF2) × 4	Kleos Space	Low Earth (SSO)	Navigation	First: 7 December 2023; Last: 16 August 2024	Successful
1 April; 16:24:16	⚀ (India) Pixxel TD-2 Shakuntala	Pixxel	Low Earth (SSO)	Earth observation	13 January 2024	Successful
1 April; 16:24:16	⚀ (Chile) PlantSat	University of Chile	Low Earth (SSO)	Biosatellite	In orbit	Operational
1 April; 16:24:16	⚀ (United States) SpaceBEE × 12	Swarm Technologies	Low Earth (SSO)	Communications	First: 3 October 2023; Last: 17 October 2023	Successful
1 April; 16:24:16	⚀ (Chile) SUCHAI 2	University of Chile	Low Earth (SSO)	Ionospheric research	6 October 2024	Successful
1 April; 16:24:16	⚀ (Chile) SUCHAI 3	University of Chile	Low Earth (SSO)	Ionospheric research	25 May 2024	Successful
1 April; 16:24:16	Dedicated SmallSat Rideshare mission to sun-synchronous orbit, designated Transporter-4. ION SCV-005 carried Upmosphere's UP-box as hosted payload.					
2 April; 12:41:38	(United States) Electron	"Without Mission A Beat"	(New Zealand) Mahia LC-1A		(United States) Rocket Lab	
2 April; 12:41:38	(United States) BlackSky 16 (Global 18)	BlackSky	Low Earth	Earth observation	In orbit	Operational
2 April; 12:41:38	(United States) BlackSky 17 (Global 20)	BlackSky	Low Earth	Earth observation	4 April 2025	Successful
2 April; 12:41:38	Last of four dedicated launches for BlackSky.					
6 April; 23:47	(China) Long March 4C	4C-Y38	(China) Jiuquan SLS-2		(China) CASC	
6 April; 23:47	(China) Gaofen 3-03	Ministry of Natural Resources	Low Earth (SSO)	Earth observation	In orbit	Operational
7 April; 11:20:18	(Russia) Soyuz-2.1b		(Russia) Plesetsk Site 43/3		(Russia) RVSN RF	
7 April; 11:20:18	(Russia) Lotos-S1 №5 (Kosmos-2554)	Ministry of Defence	Low Earth	ELINT	In orbit	Operational
8 April; 15:17:12	(United States) Falcon 9 Block 5	F9-147	(United States) Kennedy LC-39A		(United States) SpaceX	
8 April; 15:17:12	(United States) Ax-1	SpaceX / Axiom Space	Low Earth (ISS)	Private spaceflight	25 April; 17:06	Successful
8 April; 15:17:12	Axiom Mission 1, launching on Crew Dragon. Commercial flight of four (one professional and three private) astronauts to the International Space Station for a stay of 15 days.					
15 April; 12:00	(China) Long March 3B/E	3B-Y89	(China) Xichang LC-2		(China) CASC	
15 April; 12:00	(China) ChinaSat 6D	China Satcom	Geosynchronous	Communications	In orbit	Operational
15 April; 12:00	Replacement for ChinaSat 6A.					
15 April; 18:16	(China) Long March 4C	4C-Y28	(China) Taiyuan LC-9		(China) CASC	
15 April; 18:16	(China) Daqi-1 (Atmosphere-1)	Ministry of Ecology and Environment	Low Earth (SSO)	Environmental monitoring	In orbit	Operational
17 April; 13:13:12	(United States) Falcon 9 Block 5	F9-148	(United States) Vandenberg SLC-4E		(United States) SpaceX	
17 April; 13:13:12	(United States) USA-327 (Intruder F/O-1/NOSS-4 1)	NRO / USN	Low Earth	SIGINT	In orbit	Operational
17 April; 13:13:12	NROL-85 mission.					
21 April; 17:51:40	(United States) Falcon 9 Block 5	Starlink Group 4-14	(United States) Cape Canaveral SLC-40		(United States) SpaceX	
21 April; 17:51:40	(United States) Starlink × 53	SpaceX	Low Earth	Communications	In orbit	Operational
27 April; 07:52:55	(United States) Falcon 9 Block 5	F9-150	(United States) Kennedy LC-39A		(United States) SpaceX	
27 April; 07:52:55	(United States) SpaceX Crew-4	SpaceX / NASA	Low Earth (ISS)	Expedition 67	14 October; 20:55	Successful
27 April; 07:52:55	Fourth operational Crew Dragon mission to the ISS for NASA.					
29 April; 04:11:33	(China) Long March 2C	2C-Y70	(China) Jiuquan SLS-2		(China) CASC	
29 April; 04:11:33	(China) SuperView Neo 1-01 (Siwei Gaojing 1-01)	China Siwei	Low Earth (SSO)	Earth observation	In orbit	Operational
29 April; 04:11:33	(China) SuperView Neo 1-02 (Siwei Gaojing 1-02)	China Siwei	Low Earth (SSO)	Earth observation	In orbit	Operational
29 April; 19:55:22	(Russia) Angara 1.2		(Russia) Plesetsk Site 35/1		(Russia) RVSN RF	
29 April; 19:55:22	(Russia) EO MKA №2 (Kosmos-2555)	VKS	Low Earth (SSO)	Reconnaissance	18 May	Spacecraft failure (?)
29 April; 19:55:22	Maiden flight of Angara 1.2. No orbit-raising activities were detected from Kosmos-2555 following deployment, indicating a possible spacecraft failure.					
29 April; 21:27:10	(United States) Falcon 9 Block 5	Starlink Group 4-16	(United States) Cape Canaveral SLC-40		(United States) SpaceX	
29 April; 21:27:10	(United States) Starlink × 53	SpaceX	Low Earth	Communications	In orbit	Operational
30 April; 03:30	(China) Long March 11H	Y3	Tai Rui Launch Platform, East China Sea		(China) CASC	
30 April; 03:30	(China) Jilin-1 Gaofen-03D × 4 (04–07)	Chang Guang Satellite Technology	Low Earth (SSO)	Earth observation	First: 25 January 2026; Last: 3 May 2026	Successful
30 April; 03:30	(China) Jilin-1 Gaofen-04A	Chang Guang Satellite Technology	Low Earth (SSO)	Earth observation	17 December 2025	Successful
← Jan; Feb; Mar; Apr; May; Jun; Jul; Aug; Sep; Oct; Nov; Dec →; === May ===
2 May; 22:49:52	(United States) Electron	"There And Back Again"	(New Zealand) Mahia LC-1A		(United States) Rocket Lab	
2 May; 22:49:52	(United States) E-Space Demo × 3	E-Space	Low Earth (SSO)	Technology demonstration	In orbit	Operational
2 May; 22:49:52	⚀ (Finland) AuroraSat-1	Aurora Propulsion Technologies	Low Earth (SSO)	Technology demonstration	In orbit	Operational
2 May; 22:49:52	⚀ (France) BRO-6	UnseenLabs	Low Earth (SSO)	SIGINT	In orbit	Operational
2 May; 22:49:52	⚀ (New Zealand) Copia	Astrix Aeronautics	Low Earth (SSO)	Technology demonstration	In orbit	Operational
2 May; 22:49:52	⚀ (United States) SpaceBEE × 16	Swarm Technologies	Low Earth (SSO)	Communications	In orbit	Operational
2 May; 22:49:52	⚀ (New Zealand) SpaceBEE NZ × 8	Swarm Technologies	Low Earth (SSO)	Communications	In orbit	Operational
2 May; 22:49:52	▫ (United States) MyRadar-1	ACME AtronOmatic	Low Earth (SSO)	Technology demonstration	In orbit	Operational
2 May; 22:49:52	▫ (Germany) TRSI-2	TRSI	Low Earth (SSO)	Amateur radio	In orbit	Operational
2 May; 22:49:52	▫ (Germany) TRSI-3	TRSI	Low Earth (SSO)	Amateur radio	In orbit	Operational
2 May; 22:49:52	▫ (United Kingdom) Unicorn 2	Alba Orbital	Low Earth (SSO)	Earth observation	In orbit	Operational
2 May; 22:49:52	Rideshare mission. First mid-air helicopter capture attempt of an Electron first stage following launch. Copia remained attached to the kick stage as intended for a demonstration of inflatable solar arrays.					
5 May; 02:38	(China) Long March 2D	2D-Y79	(China) Taiyuan LC-9		(China) CASC	
5 May; 02:38	(China) Jilin-1 Kuanfu-01C	Chang Guang Satellite Technology	Low Earth (SSO)	Earth observation	In orbit	Operational
5 May; 02:38	(China) Jilin-1 Gaofen-03D × 7 (27–33)	Chang Guang Satellite Technology	Low Earth (SSO)	Earth observation	In orbit	Operational
6 May; 09:42	(United States) Falcon 9 Block 5	Starlink Group 4-17	(United States) Kennedy LC-39A		(United States) SpaceX	
6 May; 09:42	(United States) Starlink × 53	SpaceX	Low Earth	Communications	In orbit	Operational
9 May; 17:56:37	(China) Long March 7	Y5	(China) Wenchang LC-2		(China) CASC	
9 May; 17:56:37	(China) Tianzhou 4	CMSA	Low Earth (TSS)	Space logistics	14 November; 23:21	Successful
9 May; 17:56:37	⚀ (China) Zhixing-3A	Zhixing Space	Low Earth	Earth observation	In orbit	Operational
9 May; 17:56:37	Third cargo delivery mission to the Tiangong space station. Zhixing-3A was deployed from the Tianzhou 4 spacecraft on 13 November 2022.					
13 May; 07:09	(China) Hyperbola-1	Y4	(China) Jiuquan LS-95B		(China) i-Space	
13 May; 07:09	(China) Jilin-1 Mofang-01A	Chang Guang Satellite Technology	Low Earth (SSO)	Earth observation	13 May	Launch failure
13 May; 07:09	(China) Golden Bauhinia-1 04	Hong Kong Aerospace Science & Technology / ZeroG Lab	Low Earth (SSO)	Earth observation	13 May	Launch failure
13 May; 07:09	Hyperbola-1 reflight following the launch failure on 3 August 2021, carrying a replacement for the Jilin-1 Mofang-01A satellite lost on that launch. The launch resulted in a failure, with the cause currently under investigation.					
13 May; 22:07:50	(United States) Falcon 9 Block 5	Starlink Group 4-13	(United States) Vandenberg SLC-4E		(United States) SpaceX	
13 May; 22:07:50	(United States) Starlink × 53	SpaceX	Low Earth	Communications	In orbit	Operational
14 May; 20:40:50	(United States) Falcon 9 Block 5	Starlink Group 4-15	(United States) Cape Canaveral SLC-40		(United States) SpaceX	
14 May; 20:40:50	(United States) Starlink × 53	SpaceX	Low Earth	Communications	In orbit	Operational
18 May; 10:59:40	(United States) Falcon 9 Block 5	Starlink Group 4-18	(United States) Kennedy LC-39A		(United States) SpaceX	
18 May; 10:59:40	(United States) Starlink × 53	SpaceX	Low Earth	Communications	In orbit	Operational
19 May; 08:03:32	(Russia) Soyuz-2.1a		(Russia) Plesetsk Site 43/4		(Russia) RVSN RF	
19 May; 08:03:32	(Russia) Bars-M 3L (Kosmos-2556)	VKS	Low Earth (SSO)	Reconnaissance	In orbit	Operational
19 May; 22:54:47	(United States) Atlas V N22	AV-082	(United States) Cape Canaveral SLC-41		(United States) ULA	
19 May; 22:54:47	(United States) Boe OFT-2	Boeing / NASA	Low Earth (ISS)	Flight test / ISS logistics	25 May; 22:49	Successful
19 May; 22:54:47	Boeing Orbital Flight Test 2 of Starliner, as part of the Commercial Crew Development program.					
20 May; 10:30	(China) Long March 2C / YZ-1S	2C-Y53	(China) Jiuquan SLS-2		(China) CASC	
20 May; 10:30	(China) LEO Test Sat 1	Chang Guang Satellite Technology	Low Earth	Communications	In orbit	Operational
20 May; 10:30	(China) LEO Test Sat 2	Chang Guang Satellite Technology	Low Earth	Communications	In orbit	Operational
20 May; 10:30	(China) Digui Tongxin Weixing	DFH Satellite	Low Earth	Communications	In orbit	Operational
25 May; 18:35:00	(United States) Falcon 9 Block 5	Transporter-5	(United States) Cape Canaveral SLC-40		(United States) SpaceX	
25 May; 18:35:00	(Italy) ION SCV-006 Thrilling Thomas	D-Orbit	Low Earth (SSO)	CubeSat deployer	In orbit	Operational
25 May; 18:35:00	(United States) Sherpa-AC1	Spaceflight, Inc.	Low Earth (SSO)	CubeSat deployer	In orbit	Operational
25 May; 18:35:00	(United States) Vigoride-3 (VR-3)	Momentus Space	Low Earth (SSO)	Space tug	In orbit	Operational
25 May; 18:35:00	(Canada) GHGSat-C3 (Luca)	GHGSat	Low Earth (SSO)	Earth observation	In orbit	Operational
25 May; 18:35:00	(Canada) GHGSat-C4 (Penny)	GHGSat	Low Earth (SSO)	Earth observation	In orbit	Operational
25 May; 18:35:00	(Canada) GHGSat-C5 (Diako)	GHGSat	Low Earth (SSO)	Earth observation	In orbit	Operational
25 May; 18:35:00	(United States) Hawk 5A, 5B, 5C	HawkEye 360	Low Earth (SSO)	SIGINT	In orbit	Operational
25 May; 18:35:00	(Finland) ICEYE × 5	ICEYE	Low Earth (SSO)	Earth observation	In orbit	Operational
25 May; 18:35:00	(Argentina) ÑuSat × 4	Satellogic	Low Earth (SSO)	Earth observation	In orbit	Operational
25 May; 18:35:00	(United States) Umbra-03	Umbra Space	Low Earth (SSO)	Earth observation	In orbit	Operational
25 May; 18:35:00	⚀ (United States) Agile Micro Sat	MIT Lincoln Laboratory	Low Earth (SSO)	Technology demonstration	In orbit	Operational
25 May; 18:35:00	⚀ (Spain) (Armenia) Armsat_1 (Urdaneta)	Satlantis	Low Earth (SSO)	Earth observation	In orbit	Operational
25 May; 18:35:00	⚀ (United States) BroncoSat-1	Cal Poly Pomona	Low Earth (SSO)	Technology demonstration	In orbit	Operational
25 May; 18:35:00	⚀ (Australia) Centauri-5	Fleet Space	Low Earth (SSO)	IoT	In orbit	Operational
25 May; 18:35:00	⚀ (United States) Cicero-2 × 2	GeoOptics	Low Earth (SSO)	GNSS radio occultation	In orbit	Operational
25 May; 18:35:00	⚀ (United States) CNCE Block 2 × 2	MDA	Low Earth (SSO)	Technology demonstration	In orbit	Operational
25 May; 18:35:00	⚀ (Turkey) Connecta T1.1	Plan-S	Low Earth (SSO)	IoT	In orbit	Operational
25 May; 18:35:00	⚀ (United States) CPOD A (Tyvak-0032)	Tyvak	Low Earth (SSO)	Technology demonstration	In orbit	Operational
25 May; 18:35:00	⚀ (United States) CPOD B (Tyvak-0033)	Tyvak	Low Earth (SSO)	Technology demonstration	In orbit	Operational
25 May; 18:35:00	⚀ (Finland) Foresail-1	FCERSS	Low Earth (SSO)	Technology demonstration	In orbit	Operational
25 May; 18:35:00	⚀ (Spain) Guardian 1	Aistech Space	Low Earth (SSO)	Earth observation	In orbit	Operational
25 May; 18:35:00	⚀ (United States) Lemur-2 × 5	Spire Global	Low Earth (SSO)	Earth observation	In orbit	Operational
25 May; 18:35:00	⚀ (United States) Omnispace Spark-2	Omnispace	Low Earth (SSO)	IoT	In orbit	Operational
25 May; 18:35:00	⚀ (Czech Republic) Planetum-1	Planetum	Low Earth (SSO)	Education	In orbit	Operational
25 May; 18:35:00	⚀ (Bulgaria) (South Africa) Platform 1 (Shared Sat 2)	EnduroSat / Hypernova	Low Earth (SSO)	Technology demonstration	In orbit	Operational
25 May; 18:35:00	⚀ (United States) PTD-3 / TBIRD	NASA Ames / MIT Lincoln Laboratory	Low Earth (SSO)	Technology demonstration	In orbit	Operational
25 May; 18:35:00	⚀ (United States) (Italy) SBUDNIC	Brown University School of Engineering / CNR	Low Earth (SSO)	Earth observation	10 August 2023	Successful
25 May; 18:35:00	⚀ (Norway) SelfieSat	Orbit NTNU	Low Earth (SSO)	Education	In orbit	Operational
25 May; 18:35:00	⚀ (Germany) SPiN-1 (MA61C)	SPiN	Low Earth (SSO)	PnP	In orbit	Operational
25 May; 18:35:00	⚀ (United States) VariSat-1C	VariSat	Low Earth (SSO)	Technology demonstration	In orbit	Operational
25 May; 18:35:00	▫ (Spain) FOSSASAT-2E × 7	FOSSA Systems	Low Earth (SSO)	IoT	In orbit	Operational × 5 Failed deployment × 2
25 May; 18:35:00	▫ (United States) Veery-FS1 (Canary Hatchling)	Care Weather Technologies	Low Earth (SSO)	Technology demonstration	In orbit	Operational
25 May; 18:35:00	Dedicated SmallSat Rideshare mission to sun-synchronous orbit, designated Transporter-5. 59 small satellites and hosted payloads were launched on this mission. The Nanoracks Outpost technology demonstration mission, named Outpost Mars Demo-1 (OMD-1), will cut metal samples representative of C4M upper stages in order to test technologies for converting spent upper stages into Nanoracks Space Outposts. Sherpa-AC1 carries Xona Space's Huginn Mission and NearSpace Launch's TROOP-3 as hosted payloads, while ION SCV-006 carries Cryptosat's Crypto1 nanosatellite as a hosted payload.					
← Jan; Feb; Mar; Apr; May; Jun; Jul; Aug; Sep; Oct; Nov; Dec →; === June ===
2 June; 04:00	(China) Long March 2C	2C-Y65	(China) Xichang LC-3		(China) CASC	
2 June; 04:00	(China) GeeSAT-1 × 9 (01–09)	Geespace	Low Earth	Navigation; Communications	In orbit	Operational
2 June; 04:00	First nine GeeSAT-1 satellites for the Geely Future Mobility Constellation.					
3 June; 09:32:20	(Russia) Soyuz-2.1a		(Kazakhstan) Baikonur Site 31/6		(Russia) Roscosmos	
3 June; 09:32:20	(Russia) Progress MS-20 / 81P	Roscosmos	Low Earth (ISS)	ISS logistics	7 February 2023; 08:37	Successful
3 June; 09:32:20	⚀ (Russia) YuZGU-55 (RadioSkaf) 11–12	South-West State University	Low Earth	Technology demonstration	31 January 2023	Successful
3 June; 09:32:20	⚀ (Russia) Tsiolkovsky-Ryazan 1	RSREU	Low Earth	Amateur radio	27 January 2023	Successful
3 June; 09:32:20	⚀ (Russia) Tsiolkovsky-Ryazan 2	RSREU	Low Earth	Amateur radio	31 January 2023	Successful
5 June; 02:44:10	(China) Long March 2F	Y14	(China) Jiuquan SLS-1		(China) CASC	
5 June; 02:44:10	(China) Shenzhou 14	CMSA	Low Earth (TSS)	Crewed spaceflight	4 December; 12:09	Successful
5 June; 02:44:10	Third crewed flight to the Tiangong space station. First crewed flight of the space station construction phase.					
8 June; 21:04	(United States) Falcon 9 Block 5	F9-157	(United States) Cape Canaveral SLC-40		(United States) SpaceX	
8 June; 21:04	(Egypt) Nilesat-301	Nilesat	Geosynchronous	Communications	In orbit	Operational
8 June; 21:04	Eventual replacement for Nilesat 201, which will be decommissioned by 2028.					
12 June; 17:43	(United States) Rocket 3.3	LV0010	(United States) Cape Canaveral SLC-46		(United States) Astra	
12 June; 17:43	⚀ (United States) TROPICS x 2	NASA	Low Earth	Earth observation	12 June	Launch failure
12 June; 17:43	First of three launches for the TROPICS constellation. The second stage shut down early, resulting in a launch failure.					
17 June; 16:09:20	(United States) Falcon 9 Block 5	Starlink Group 4-19	(United States) Kennedy LC-39A		(United States) SpaceX	
17 June; 16:09:20	(United States) Starlink × 53	SpaceX	Low Earth	Communications	In orbit	Operational
18 June; 14:19:52	(United States) Falcon 9 Block 5	F9-159	(United States) Vandenberg SLC-4E		(United States) SpaceX	
18 June; 14:19:52	(Germany) SARah-1	Bundeswehr	Low Earth (SSO)	Reconnaissance	In orbit	Operational
19 June; 04:27:36	(United States) Falcon 9 Block 5	F9-160	(United States) Cape Canaveral SLC-40		(United States) SpaceX	
19 June; 04:27:36	(United States) Globalstar FM15 (M087)	Globalstar	Low Earth	Communications	In orbit	Operational
19 June; 04:27:36	(United States) USA-328, 329, 330, 331	TBA	Low Earth	TBA	In orbit	Operational
19 June; 04:27:36	The identities of the secondary payloads have not been disclosed.					
21 June; 07:00	(South Korea) Nuri (KSLV-II)		(South Korea) Naro LC-2		(South Korea) KARI	
21 June; 07:00	(South Korea) PVSAT	KARI	Low Earth (SSO)	Technology demonstration CubeSat deployer	In orbit	Operational
21 June; 07:00	(South Korea) Mass simulator	KARI	Low Earth (SSO)	Boilerplate	In orbit	Successful
21 June; 07:00	⚀ (South Korea) Dummy	KARI	Low Earth (SSO)	Boilerplate	In orbit	Successful
21 June; 07:00	⚀ (South Korea) MIMAN (CubesatYonsei)	Yonsei University	Low Earth (SSO)	Technology demonstration	In orbit	Operational
21 June; 07:00	⚀ (South Korea) RANDEV (ASTRIS-II)	KAIST	Low Earth (SSO)	Technology demonstration	In orbit	Operational
21 June; 07:00	⚀ (South Korea) SNUGLITE-II	Seoul National University	Low Earth (SSO)	Technology demonstration	In orbit	Operational
21 June; 07:00	⚀ (South Korea) STEP CubeLab-II	Chosun University	Low Earth (SSO)	Technology demonstration	In orbit	Operational
21 June; 07:00	Second flight of Nuri, carrying a 1,500 kg (3,300 lb) dummy satellite, a 162.5 kg (358 lb) performance verification satellite and five CubeSats.					
22 June; 02:08	(China) Kuaizhou 1A	Y23	(China) Jiuquan LS-95A		(China) ExPace	
22 June; 02:08	(China) Tianxing-1	CAS	Low Earth (SSO)	Space environment observation	29 March 2023	Successful
22 June; 02:08	Return-to-flight for Kuaizhou 1A following the December 2021 launch failure.					
22 June; 21:50	(France) Ariane 5 ECA	VA257	(France) Kourou ELA-3		(France) Arianespace	
22 June; 21:50	(Malaysia) MEASAT-3d	MEASAT	Geosynchronous	Communications	In orbit	Operational
22 June; 21:50	(India) GSAT-24 (GSAT-N1/CMS-02)	NSIL / Tata Sky	Geosynchronous	Communications	In orbit	Operational
22 June; 21:50	MEASAT-3d will replace both MEASAT-3 and MEASAT-3a.					
23 June; 02:22	(China) Long March 2D	2D-Y64	(China) Xichang LC-3		(China) CASC	
23 June; 02:22	(China) Yaogan 35-02A	CAS	Low Earth	Reconnaissance	In orbit	Operational
23 June; 02:22	(China) Yaogan 35-02B	CAS	Low Earth	Reconnaissance	In orbit	Operational
23 June; 02:22	(China) Yaogan 35-02C	CAS	Low Earth	Reconnaissance	In orbit	Operational
27 June; 15:46	(China) Long March 4C	4C-Y46	(China) Jiuquan SLS-2		(China) CASC	
27 June; 15:46	(China) Gaofen-12 03	CNSA	Low Earth (SSO)	Earth observation	In orbit	Operational
28 June; 09:55:52	(United States) Electron		(New Zealand) Mahia LC-1B		(United States) Rocket Lab	
28 June; 09:55:52	⚀ (United States) CAPSTONE	NASA	Selenocentric (NRHO)	Technology demonstration	In orbit	Operational
28 June; 09:55:52	(United States) Photon	Rocket Lab	TLI	Space tug Lunar flyby	In orbit	Successful
28 June; 09:55:52	Launch site changed from the Mid-Atlantic Regional Spaceport to Mahia due to AFTS certification delays.					
29 June; 21:04	(United States) Falcon 9 Block 5	F9-161	(United States) Cape Canaveral SLC-40		(United States) SpaceX	
29 June; 21:04	(Luxembourg) SES-22	SES S.A.	Geosynchronous	Communications	In orbit	Operational
30 June; 12:32	(India) PSLV-CA	C53	(India) Satish Dhawan SLP		(India) NSIL	
30 June; 12:32	(Singapore) DS-EO	DSTA	Low Earth	Earth observation	In orbit	Operational
30 June; 12:32	(Singapore) NeuSAR	ST Engineering	Low Earth	Earth observation	In orbit	Operational
30 June; 12:32	(Singapore) Scoob-1	Nanyang Technological University	Low Earth	Education	In orbit	Operational
30 June; 12:32	The POEM-1 was also launched in this mission, carrying 6 hosted payloads, is attached to the upper stage.					
← Jan; Feb; Mar; Apr; May; Jun; Jul; Aug; Sep; Oct; Nov; Dec →
For flights after 30 June, see 2022 in spaceflight (July–December)

== Suborbital flights ==
Date and time (UTC)	Rocket	Flight number	Launch site		LSP	
Date and time (UTC)	Payload (⚀ = CubeSat)	Operator	Orbit	Function	Decay (UTC)	Outcome
Date and time (UTC)	Remarks					
9 January; 05:00	(Canada) Black Brant IX		(United States) Wallops Flight Facility		(United States) NASA	
9 January; 05:00	(United States) DXL-4	University of Miami	Suborbital	X-ray astronomy	9 January	Successful
17 January	(Yemen) Zolfaghar		(Yemen)		(Yemen) Houthis	
17 January	(Yemen) Live warhead	Houthis	Suborbital	Missile launch	17 January	Intercepted
17 January	Targeted at Abu Dhabi International Airport (1 of 2). More were possibly launched. One missile intercepted by a THAAD missile.					
17 January	(Yemen) Zolfaghar		(Yemen)		(Yemen) Houthis	
17 January	(Yemen) Live warhead	Houthis	Suborbital	Missile launch	17 January	Successful
17 January	Targeted at Abu Dhabi International Airport (2 of 2). More were possibly launched.					
18 January	(Israel) Sparrow		(Israel) F-15 Eagle		(Israel) IAI/IDF	
18 January	(Israel)	IAF	Suborbital	Target missile	18 January	Successful
18 January	Target missile.					
18 January	(Israel) Arrow-3		(Israel)		(Israel) IAI/IDF	
18 January	(Israel)	IAF	Suborbital	Interceptor	18 January	Successful
18 January	Arrow-3 missile intercepting a Sparrow target missile (1 of 2).					
18 January	(Israel) Arrow-3		(Israel)		(Israel) IAI/IDF	
18 January	(Israel)	IAF	Suborbital	Interceptor	18 January	Successful
18 January	Arrow-3 missile intercepting a Sparrow target missile (2 of 2).					
23 January; 04:10	(China) Tianxing ?		(China) Jiuquan		(China) Space Transportation	
23 January; 04:10	(China)	Space Transportation	Suborbital	Flight test	23 January	Successful
23 January; 04:10	Test flight of the Tianxing ? suborbital spaceplane.					
24 January; 03:30	(China) Tianxing ?		(China) Jiuquan		(China) Space Transportation	
24 January; 03:30	(China)	Space Transportation	Suborbital	Flight test	24 January	Successful
24 January; 03:30	Test flight of the Tianxing ? suborbital spaceplane.					
24 January	(Yemen) Zolfaghar		(Yemen)		(Yemen) Houthis	
24 January	(Yemen) Live warhead	Houthis	Suborbital	Missile launch	24 January	Intercepted
24 January	Targeted at Abu Dhabi (1 of 2). Intercepted by a THAAD missile.					
24 January	(Yemen) Zolfaghar		(Yemen)		(Yemen) Houthis	
24 January	(Yemen) Live warhead	Houthis	Suborbital	Missile launch	24 January	Intercepted
24 January	Targeted at Abu Dhabi (2 of 2). Intercepted by a THAAD missile.					
29 January; 07:00:00	(United States) Improved Malemute/Improved Malemute	MAPHEUS 9	(Sweden) Esrange		(Germany) MORABA	
29 January; 07:00:00	(Germany) MAPHEUS-9	DLR	Suborbital	Microgravity research	29 January	Successful
29 January; 07:00:00	Apogee: 253.6 km (157.6 mi).					
29 January; 22:52	(North Korea) Hwasong-12		(North Korea) Mupyong-ri, Chagang		(North Korea) KPA Strategic Rocket Force	
29 January; 22:52	(North Korea)	KPA Strategic Rocket Force	Suborbital	Missile test	29 January	Successful
29 January; 22:52	Apogee: ~2,000 km (1,243 mi), re-entered 800 km (497 mi) downrange.					
1 February	(Yemen) Zolfaghar		(Yemen)		(Yemen) Houthis	
1 February	(Yemen) Live warhead	Houthis	Suborbital	Missile launch	1 February	Intercepted
1 February	Intercepted by a Patriot Missile.					
Early February	(Iran) Khaibar-buster		(Iran)		(Iran)	
Early February	(Iran) Live warhead		Suborbital	Missile Test	February	Successful
Early February	First flight of the Khaibar-buster missile.					
19 February	(Russia) RS-24 Yars		(Russia) Plesetsk Cosmodrome		(Russia) Russian Ministry of Defence	
19 February	(Russia)	Russian Ministry of Defence	Suborbital	ICBM test	19 February	Successful
19 February	Hit a target on the Kamchatka Peninsula, 5,700 km (3,542 mi) downrange.					
19 February	(Russia) R-29RMU Sineva		(Russia) Submarine Karelia, Barents Sea		(Russia) Russian Ministry of Defence	
19 February	(Russia)	Russian Ministry of Defence	Suborbital	SLBM test	19 February	Successful
19 February	Hit a target on the Kamchatka Peninsula.					
26 February	(North Korea) Hwasong-17 (?)		(North Korea) Sunan		(North Korea) KPA Strategic Rocket Force	
26 February	(North Korea)	NADA	Suborbital	ICBM test	26 February	Successful
26 February	Apogee: ~620 km (385.3 mi). Tested an imaging system for future reconnaissance satellites.					
5 March; 11:27	(Canada) Black Brant IX		(United States) Poker Flat Research Range		(United States) NASA	
5 March; 11:27	(United States) LAMP	Goddard Space Flight Center	Suborbital	Auroral science	5 March	Successful
5 March; 11:27	Apogee: 429 km (267 mi).					
5 March	(North Korea) Hwasong-17 (?)		(North Korea) Sunan		(North Korea) KPA Strategic Rocket Force	
5 March	(North Korea)	NADA	Suborbital	ICBM test	5 March	Successful
5 March	Apogee: ~560 km (348.0 mi).					
9 March; 18:25	(Canada) Black Brant IX	HERSCHEL II	(United States) White Sands Missile Range		(United States) NASA	
9 March; 18:25	(United States) HERSCHEL	Naval Research Laboratory	Suborbital	Solar observation	9 March	Successful
9 March; 18:25	Second flight of HERSCHEL (HElium Resonance Scatter in the Corona and HELiosphere). Apogee: 302.07 km (187.7 mi).					
12 March	(United States) Black Dagger	Integrated Fires Mission	(United States) Fort Wingate		(United States) SMDC	
12 March	(United States)	SMDC	Suborbital	Missile test	12 March	Successful
21 March; 23:12	(United States) Terrier-Improved Malemute		(United States) Wallops Flight Facility		(United States) NASA	
21 March; 23:12	(United States) BOLT-2	United States Air Force	Suborbital	Laminar–turbulent transition measurements	21 March	Successful
24 March; 05:34	(North Korea) Hwasong-15 or Hwasong-17		(North Korea) Sunan		(North Korea) KPA Strategic Rocket Force	
24 March; 05:34	(North Korea)	KPA Strategic Rocket Force	Suborbital	Missile test	24 March; 06:45	Successful
24 March; 05:34	Apogee: ~6,248.5 km (3,883 mi), re-entered 1,090 km (677 mi) downrange. South Korea's Ministry of National Defense identifies this as a Hwasong-15 missile test, contrary to North Korea's statement of this being a Hwasong-17 test.					
24 March	(South Korea) Blue Whale 0.1		(South Korea) Jeju Island		(South Korea) Perigee Aerospace	
24 March	(South Korea)	Perigee Aerospace / KAIST	Suborbital	Flight test	24 March	Successful
24 March	Third flight of Blue Whale 0.1					
29 March	(United States) Black Dagger	Integrated Fires Mission	(United States) White Sands Missile Range		(United States) SMDC	
29 March	(United States)	SMDC	Suborbital	Missile test	29 March	Successful
30 March	(South Korea) SK solid fueled TV1		(South Korea) Jackup sea installation		(South Korea) Ministry of National Defense	
30 March	(South Korea) Dummy satellite	Ministry of National Defense	Suborbital	Test flight	30 March	Successful
30 March	First test launch of the solid-fuel launch projectile developed by the ADD.					
31 March; 13:57:55	(United States) New Shepard	NS-20	(United States) Corn Ranch		(United States) Blue Origin	
31 March; 13:57:55	(United States) Blue Origin NS-20	Blue Origin	Suborbital	Crewed spaceflight	31 March 2022; 14:07:59	Successful
31 March; 13:57:55	Fourth crewed flight of New Shepard. Apogee: 107 km (66.49 mi).					
7 April; 12:47	(Canada) Black Brant IX		(United States) Poker Flat Research Range		(United States) NASA	
7 April; 12:47	(United States) INCAA	Clemson University	Suborbital	Auroral science	7 April 2022	Successful
7 April; 12:47	First of two INCAA flights, carrying the vapor trail payload. Apogee: 339.6 km (211.0 mi).					
7 April; 12:50	(United States) Terrier-Improved Malemute		(United States) Poker Flat Research Range		(United States) NASA	
7 April; 12:50	(United States) INCAA	Clemson University	Suborbital	Auroral science	7 April 2022	Successful
7 April; 12:50	Second of two INCAA flights, carrying the instrumented payload. Apogee: 207.6 km (129.0 mi).					
9 April	(Pakistan) Shaheen-III		(Pakistan)		Pakistan Army	
9 April	(Pakistan)	Pakistan Army	Suborbital	Missile test	19 April	Successful
18 April	(South Korea) Hyunmoo 4-4		(South Korea) Submarine ROKS Dosan Ahn Changho		(South Korea) Republic of Korea Navy	
18 April	(South Korea)	Republic of Korea Navy	Suborbital	Missile test	18 April	Successful
18 April	Two missiles launched within 20 seconds of each other. (1 of 2).					
18 April	(South Korea) Hyunmoo 4-4		(South Korea) Submarine ROKS Dosan Ahn Changho		(South Korea) Republic of Korea Navy	
18 April	(South Korea)	Republic of Korea Navy	Suborbital	Missile test	18 April	Successful
18 April	Two missiles launched within 20 seconds of each other. (2 of 2).					
18 April; 01:00	(United States)		(United States) Spaceport America		United States Military Academy	
18 April; 01:00	(United States)	United States Military Academy	Suborbital	Amateur rocket	18 April	Launch failure
18 April; 01:00	Second stage failure.					
18 April; 02:00	(United States)		(United States) Spaceport America		United States Military Academy	
18 April; 02:00	(United States)	United States Military Academy	Suborbital	Amateur rocket	18 April	Successful
18 April; 02:00	Apogee: 90 km (56 mi).					
20 April; 12:12	(Russia) RS-28 Sarmat		(Russia) Plesetsk		(Russia) RVSN	
20 April; 12:12	(Russia)	RVSN	Suborbital	Missile test	20 April	Successful
20 April; 12:12	Flight test of the RS-28 Sarmat ICBM. Impacted mock targets on the Kamchatka Peninsula.					
4 May; 03:04	(North Korea) Unknown missile		(North Korea)		(North Korea) KPA Strategic Rocket Force	
4 May; 03:04	(North Korea)	KPA Strategic Rocket Force	Suborbital	Missile test	4 May	Successful
4 May; 03:04	Apogee: ~780 km (484.7 mi), re-entered 470 km (292 mi) downrange.					
11 May; 01:31	(United States) Oriole III-A		(Norway) Svalbard Rocket Range		(United States) NASA	
11 May; 01:31	(United States) Endurance	Goddard Space Flight Center	Suborbital	Ionospheric research	11 May	Successful
11 May; 01:31	First flight of the Oriole III-A (Terrier-Oriole-Nihka) sounding rocket. Apogee: 767 km (476.6 mi).					
14 May	(United States) AGM-183 ARRW		(United States) Boeing B-52 Stratofortress		United States Air Force	
14 May	(United States)	United States Air Force	Suborbital	Missile test	14 May	Successful
25 May; 03:04	(North Korea) Unknown missile		(North Korea)		(North Korea) KPA Strategic Rocket Force	
25 May; 03:04	(North Korea)	KPA Strategic Rocket Force	Suborbital	Missile test	25 May	Successful
25 May; 03:04	Apogee: ~540 km (335.5 mi), re-entered 360 km (224 mi) downrange.					
4 June; 13:25:02	(United States) New Shepard	NS-21	(United States) Corn Ranch		(United States) Blue Origin	
4 June; 13:25:02	(United States) Blue Origin NS-21	Blue Origin	Suborbital	Crewed spaceflight	4 June; 13:35:07	Successful
4 June; 13:25:02	Fifth crewed flight of New Shepard. Apogee: 107 km (66 mi).					
5 June	(North Korea) Unknown missile		(North Korea)		(North Korea) KPA Strategic Rocket Force	
5 June	(North Korea)	KPA Strategic Rocket Force	Suborbital	Missile test	5 June	Successful
5 June	Apogee: ~90 km (55.92 mi).					
6 June; 13:30	(India) Agni-IV		(India) Integrated Test Range		(India) Ministry of Defence	
6 June; 13:30	(India)	Ministry of Defence	Suborbital	Missile test	6 June	Successful
15 June	(United States) UGM-133 Trident II		(United States) USS Kentucky (SSBN-737)		United States Navy	
15 June	(United States)	United States Navy	Suborbital	Missile test	15 June	Successful
15 June	1 of 4.					
15 June	(United States) UGM-133 Trident II		(United States) USS Kentucky (SSBN-737)		United States Navy	
15 June	(United States)	United States Navy	Suborbital	Missile test	15 June	Successful
15 June	2 of 4.					
17 June	(United States) UGM-133 Trident II		(United States) USS Kentucky (SSBN-737)		United States Navy	
17 June	(United States)	United States Navy	Suborbital	Missile test	17 June	Successful
17 June	3 of 4.					
17 June	(United States) UGM-133 Trident II		(United States) USS Kentucky (SSBN-737)		United States Navy	
17 June	(United States)	United States Navy	Suborbital	Missile test	17 June	Successful
17 June	4 of 4.					
19 June	(China)		(China)		(China) PLA	
19 June		PLA	Suborbital	ABM target	19 June	Successful
19 June	Interceptor target					
19 June	(China)		(China)		(China) PLA	
19 June		PLA	Suborbital	ABM test	19 June	Successful
19 June	Interceptor, successful intercept.					
24 June; 09:35	(United States) Terrier-Improved Orion		(United States) Wallops Flight Facility		(United States) NASA	
24 June; 09:35	(United States) RockOn / RockSat-C / Cubes in Space	Colorado Space Grant Consortium	Suborbital	Education	24 June 2022	Successful
24 June; 09:35	Apogee: 70.5 mi (113.5 km).					
26 June; 14:29	(Canada) Black Brant IX		(Australia) Arnhem Space Centre		(United States) NASA	
26 June; 14:29	(United States) X-ray Quantum Calorimeter (XQC)	UW–Madison	Suborbital	X-ray astronomy	26 June	Successful
26 June; 14:29	Apogee: 203 mi (327 km). First launch of a suborbital rocket from Arnhem Space Centre in north-east Arnhem Land.					
26 June	(Iran) Zuljanah		(Iran) Semnan CLP		(Iran) ISA	
26 June	(Iran) TBA	TBA	Suborbital	Test flight	26 June	Successful
26 June	Suborbital test launch of the Zuljanah orbital launch vehicle.					
29 June	(United States) Long-Range Hypersonic Weapon		(United States) Pacific Missile Range Facility		United States Army / United States Navy	
29 June	(United States) Common-Hypersonic Glide Body (C-HGB)	United States Army / United States Navy	Suborbital	Missile test	29 June	Launch failure
29 June	An anomaly occurred following ignition of the missile.					
