= ThrustMe =

- Trade name: ThrustMe
- Industry: Aerospace
- Founded: 3 February 2017; 9 years ago
- Founder: Ane Aanesland, Dmytro Rafalskyi
- Headquarters: Verrières-le-Buisson, France
- Key people: Ane Aanesland (CEO), Dmytro Rafalskyi (CTO)
- Products: Spacecraft propulsion
- Number of employees: 21–50
- Website: https://www.thrustme.fr/

ThrustMe is a deep tech company that designs miniaturized aerospace thrusters for small satellites, increasing the life of satellites and making them more affordable.

The company builds gridded ion thrusters (NPT30) and cold gas thrusters (I2T5).

== History ==
ThrustMe was founded in 2017 by Ane Aanesland and Dmytro Rafalskyi, who previously worked at the École Polytechnique and CNRS as researchers in plasma physics and electric propulsion. Initially, the startup was incubated in Agoranov. Also in 2017, ThrustMe raised 1.7 million euros for its development.

In 2018, ThrustMe received €2.4 million from the European Commission to commercialise electric propulsion for nanosatellites.

In 2019, Ane Aanesland received the CNRS innovation medal for her entrepreneurial activities. The same year, Spacety and ThrustMe maneuvered for the first time a satellite using iodine as propellant, with a cold-gas thruster.

In 2021, ThrustMe, in partnership with Spacety, achieved the first in-orbit demonstration of an electric propulsion system powered by iodine. The results were published as a research article in the journal Nature, where the maneuvers described resulted in a cumulative altitude change above 3 km.

According to the European Space Agency, in regard to the use of iodine rather than Xenon in a gridded ion thruster, "This small but potentially disruptive innovation could help to clear the skies of space junk, by enabling tiny satellites to self-destruct cheaply and easily at the end of their missions, by steering themselves into the atmosphere where they would burn up."

== Flight missions ==
=== Ongoing ===
- XiaoXiang 1-08 is a six-unit cubesat developed by Chinese satellite company Spacety. It carries ThrustMe's I2T5 non-pressurized cold gas thruster, the first in existence.
- BeiHangKongshi-1 is a 12-unit cubesat developed by Spacety. The satellite carries ThrustMe's NPT30-I2-1U, the first iodine electric propulsion system sent into space. The cubesat was launched on board the Long March 6 on 6 November 2020. According to Rafalskyi, advanced orbital maneuvers would be carried out to test the satellite's full capabilities.
- Hisea-1 is a 180-kilogram SAR minisatellite. It is the first generation of light, small SAR satellites developed by Spacety carrying a NPT30-I2-1U for orbit maintenance, collision avoidance, and end-of-life deorbiting. It was launched on board a Long March 8 rocket on 22 December 2020 for ocean research.

=== Announced ===
- NorSat-TD is a microsatellite developed by the UTIAS Space Flight Laboratory (SFL) for the Norwegian space agency. The satellite was [launched in 2023; earlier it was] scheduled to be launched in the first quarter of 2022.
- GOMX-5 is an 8U cubesat built by GomSpace for the European Space Agency to perform a technology demonstration mission. The launch is scheduled for 2026.
- INSPIRESat-4/ARCADE is a 27U spacecraft built by NTU, Jülich Research Centre, LASP, IISST and NCU. The satellite aims to flight in the VLEO (Very Low Earth Orbit) region to make in-situ Ionospheric plasma measurements. The thruster is expected to lower the orbit of the satellite to less than 300 km and enable the mission to survive at this altitude for a duration of 6 months or more. The launch is scheduled for 2022.

== Awards ==
- French Tech Ticket, 2017.
- "Grand Prix i-LAB" of the 19th national competition to help the creation of innovative technology companies, 2017.
- "Prix de l'Excellence Française Innovation Spatiale", 2017.
- "Médaille de l’innovation du CNRS", for Ane Aanesland, 2019.
