= KITSUNE =

Japanese nanosatellite

- Mission type: Technology demonstration
- Operator: JAXA
- COSPAR ID: 1998-067TK
- SATCAT no.: 52148

Spacecraft properties
- Spacecraft type: CubeSat

Start of mission
- Launch date: 19 February 2022
- Rocket: Antares 230+
- Launch site: MARS, Pad 0A
- Deployed from: ISS Kibō
- Deployment date: 24 March 2022

End of mission
- Decay date: 14 March 2023

Orbital parameters
- Reference system: Geocentric
- Regime: Low Earth

KITSUNE (Kyutech standardized bus Imaging Technology System Utilizing Networking and Electron content measurements) was a JAXA nanosatellite developed by the HAK consortium, which consists of Haradaseiki Kogyo, Addnics Corporation, and Kyushu Institute of Technology (Kyutech). The spacecraft was a 6U CubeSat, and carried a high-resolution camera for Earth observation. KITSUNE was carried to the International Space Station (ISS) on board Cygnus NG-17, and was deployed from the ISS's Kibō Module on 24 March 2022 12:10 UTC. The deployment service of KITSUNE was provided by Mitsui Bussan Aerospace.

== Mission ==
KITSUNE conducted several missions while in orbit, including observing Earth with a resolution of 5 m, and communicating in C band. It also conducted store and forward, collecting data from ground-based sensor terminals. Its optics was based on an smc PENTAX-DA* 300mm F4ED[IF]SDM lens.

=== SPATIUM-II ===
In the SPATIUM-II (SPATIUM : Space Precision Atomic-clock TIming Utility Mission) mission, a UHF signal would be sent from ground stations, and KITSUNE's on board software-defined radio and Raspberry Pi computer would calculate the signal delay time. From the signal delay time, the integral value of the charge density between the satellite and ground station (total electron content) could be calculated. The SPATIUM-II mission aimed to demonstrate detecting signal delay time by an accuracy of 100 nanoseconds.

== See also ==
- Aoba VELOX-IV
- Birds-1
- Birds-2
- LEOPARD
- IHI-SAT
