= IHI-SAT =

- Mission type: technology demonstration
- Operator: IHI Corporation

Spacecraft properties
- Spacecraft type: CubeSat

Start of mission
- Launch date: 19 February 2022
- Rocket: Antares 230+
- Launch site: MARS, Pad 0A
- Deployed from: ISS Kibō; Delivered by Cygnus NG-17
- Deployment date: 24 March 2022

End of mission
- Decay date: 18 November 2022

Orbital parameters
- Reference system: Geocentric
- Regime: Low Earth
- Inclination: 51.6°

IHI-SAT was a satellite developed by IHI Corporation and the Tohoku University Space Robotics Laboratory for testing an automatic identification system (AIS) receiving system in space. The satellite's size was 10cm×10cm×34cm, or a 3U size CubeSat. IHI-SAT was IHI Corporation's first satellite.

== Overview ==
IHI Corporation is the prime contractor of JAXA's Epsilon solid fuel rocket, and has manufactured the propulsion system used on numerous satellites, such as the main engine of the Cygnus cargo spacecraft, and the liquid apogee engine for geostationary satellites based on the Northrop Grumman GEOStar-2 and Lockheed Martin A2100 satellite bus. Despite this, prior to IHI-SAT the company had not built an entire satellite on its own.

IHI-SAT is the first satellite to be built by IHI Corporation, and will test an AIS receiving system. Ground tests of the satellite was performed at the Fukushima Medical Device Development Support Centre.

IHI-SAT decayed from orbit on 18 November 2022.

Following the development of IHI-SAT, IHI Corporation has revealed plans to build several satellites on its own, such as signing a memorandum of understanding with ICEYE in May 2025 for manufacturing synthetic-aperture radar satellites in Japan to establish a satellite constellation, and signing an agreement with Surrey Satellite Technology in September 2025.

== Spacecraft ==
IHI-SAT is a 3U CubeSat with a receiving system for automatic identification system (AIS) signals sent from ships on Earth. Meisei Electric was involved in the development of IHI-SAT's AIS receiver. Once in space, the satellite's machinery cannot be fixed even if it malfunctions, so the satellite has a robust system that incorporates several recovery methods such as a self-diagnosis function. For three-axis attitude control the satellite is equipped with a GomSpace microcomputer that includes a gyroscope and a geomagnetic sensor, and carries three reaction wheels from CubeSpace, and three magnetic torquers from NanoAvionics. IHI-SAT has a sun sensor attached on all sides. In order to maximize the AIS data collected by the AIS receiver, the satellite orients itself to constantly point the receiving antenna down towards the sea, as opposed to directing it at a specific point on Earth. According to the Advanced Satellite Systems Technology Center (ASTEC), IHI-SAT likely has a VHF dipole antenna.

== See also ==
- Raijin-2
- RAIKO (satellite)
- KITSUNE
