= GOMX-5 =

European technology demonstration satellite

- Mission type: Technology demonstration
- Operator: European Space Agency
- COSPAR ID: 2026-227F

Spacecraft properties
- Spacecraft type: 8U CubeSat
- Manufacturer: (Denmark) GomSpace

Start of mission
- Launch date: 1 October 2026, 18:32 UTC
- Rocket: Falcon 9 Transporter-18

Orbital parameters
- Reference system: Geocentric
- Regime: Sun-synchronous
- Altitude: 500 km

GOMX-5 is a low Earth orbit technology demonstration satellite under development by the European Space Agency (ESA) and the Danish company GomSpace. The mission is designed to demonstrate a new 8U CubeSat platform for GomSpace, as well as an innovative maritime domain awareness payload detecting signals across UHF to X-band for maritime surveillance. The satellite also carries a radiation detector developed by Czech Technical University with ESA support. The satellite is equipped with an electric propulsion system, developed by the French company ThrustMe, for orbit raising and end-of-life disposal in compliance with ESA's space debris mitigation policy. GOMX-5 was launched in October 2026 on Falcon 9's mission Transporter-18.

Transporter-18 encapsulation

== See also ==
- List of European Space Agency programmes and missions
