= Spacety =

Chinese satellite technology company

Changsha Tianyi Space Science and Technology Research Institute Co. Ltd.
- Trade name: Spacety
- Native name: 长沙天仪空间科技研究院有限公司
- Type: Private
- Industry: Aerospace
- Founded: 2016; 10 years ago
- Headquarters: Changsha, China
- Area served: Worldwide
- Key people: Yang Feng (CEO and Founder)
- Website: www.spacety.com

Spacety, officially called Changsha Tianyi Space Science and Technology Research Institute Co. Ltd., is a Chinese satellite technology company established in 2016 with a focus on the development, manufacture, and operation of micro/nano-satellites for various applications including earth observation, scientific research, and communication.

== History ==
Spacety was founded in 2016 with the ambition to democratize access to space by providing cost-effective satellite solutions.

As of November 2019, Spacety had 70 employees working in Changsha and Beijing, with nine missions and 15 satellites in orbit. By April 2020, Spacety has expanded its satellite constellation to 18 satellites.

On December 9, 2023, two of the company's satellites were placed in orbit by the Zhuque-2 rocket, marking the company's 18th mission and bringing the total number of satellites in orbit to 30.

== Technology and services ==
Spacety specializes in the rapid development and deployment of micro and nano-satellites. These satellites support a wide range of applications, from high-resolution earth observation imaging to scientific experiments in space.

One of the company's flagship services is its satellite-as-a-service offering, which allows customers to access satellite data without the need for owning and operating their own satellites. This service is designed to lower the barrier to entry for organizations looking to utilize space data for their operations.

Spacety provides small satellite platforms with masses of 10, 20 to 50 kg, and 200 kg. By 2020, the company has received several rounds of venture capital funding totaling about $36 million. The company aims to provide fast and low-cost satellite services to entrepreneurs and startups worldwide, with a record time of four months and 21 days from signing a customer to launch.

== Satellite constellation ==
Spacety is developing a Laser Communication Aviation Internet Constellation consisting of 288 satellites at an altitude of 1000 km, forming a high-angle low Earth orbit constellation with 12 orbital planes, each containing 24 satellites. This constellation aims to achieve 100% global coverage, offering broadband access for flights at any location.

Spacety is also involved in the Gamma Ray Integrated Detectors (GRID) project, an astrophysics constellation of 24 satellites developed in cooperation with the Tsinghua Centre for Astrophysics (THCA). The main scientific objective of GRID is to identify and locate the electromagnetic counterparts of gravitational wave bursts detected by LIGO.

== Developments and partnerships ==
In September 2019, Spacety set up a subsidiary in Luxembourg to expand its engagement with European firms.

Spacety has partnered with ThrustMe, a French space propulsion startup, to test light, inexpensive solid ion thrusters for CubeSats and small satellites to provide a measure of maneuverability and address the issue of space debris.

Spacety collaborated with Hunan University of Science and Technology to develop the Spacety-33 satellite for orbital scientific experiments. Utilizing the RROS, a dual-kernel, real-time operating system crafted in Rust by the Beijing University of Posts and Telecommunications, marked the inaugural deployment of a Rust-developed kernel in space applications.

== International reception ==
=== United States ===
In February 2023, Spacety was added to a U.S. trade blacklist. U.S. officials alleged that the company had provided satellite images to the Russian paramilitary company Wagner Group.

=== Luxembourg ===
In March 2023, Luxembourg's economy and foreign ministries filed a case against Spacety's Luxembourg subsidiary, Spacety Luxembourg S.A., for its alleged ties to Moscow.

Following the sanctions, Spacety Luxembourg S.A.'s office contract in Belval was terminated. Several institutions, including the Luxembourg Institute of Science and Technology (LIST) and the University of Luxembourg, suspended their collaboration with the company. LIST had been using high-resolution images provided by Spacety for risk reduction, while the university collaborated on mechanical systems for removing space debris.

Spacety Luxembourg S.A. has denied all allegations regarding its ties to Russia and the provision of satellite images to the Wagner Group.
