= GHGSat =

Canadian satellite constellation for monitoring greenhouse gas emissions

- Operator: (Canada) GHGSat Inc.
- Applications: Greenhouse gas emissions monitoring
- Website: www.ghgsat.com/technology/satellite-constellation

Specifications
- Spacecraft type: CubeSat

ESA, CSA, and GHGsat signing an agreement about sharing data in 2019

GHGSat is a Canadian commercial satellite constellation designed to measure greenhouse gas emissions (methane and carbon dioxide). As of 2026, it consists of more than ten 16U CubeSats orbiting in a sun-synchronous orbit at an altitude of approximately 500 km, each equipped with an infrared imaging spectrometer capable of locating point sources of greenhouse gases. The constellation provides data to the United Nations, NASA, the UK Space Agency, and the European Space Agency, as well as to private companies. The first satellite GHGSat-D Claire was launched in June 2016.
