= Pentax DA* 300mm lens =

smc PENTAX-DA* 1:4 300mm ED [IF] SDM
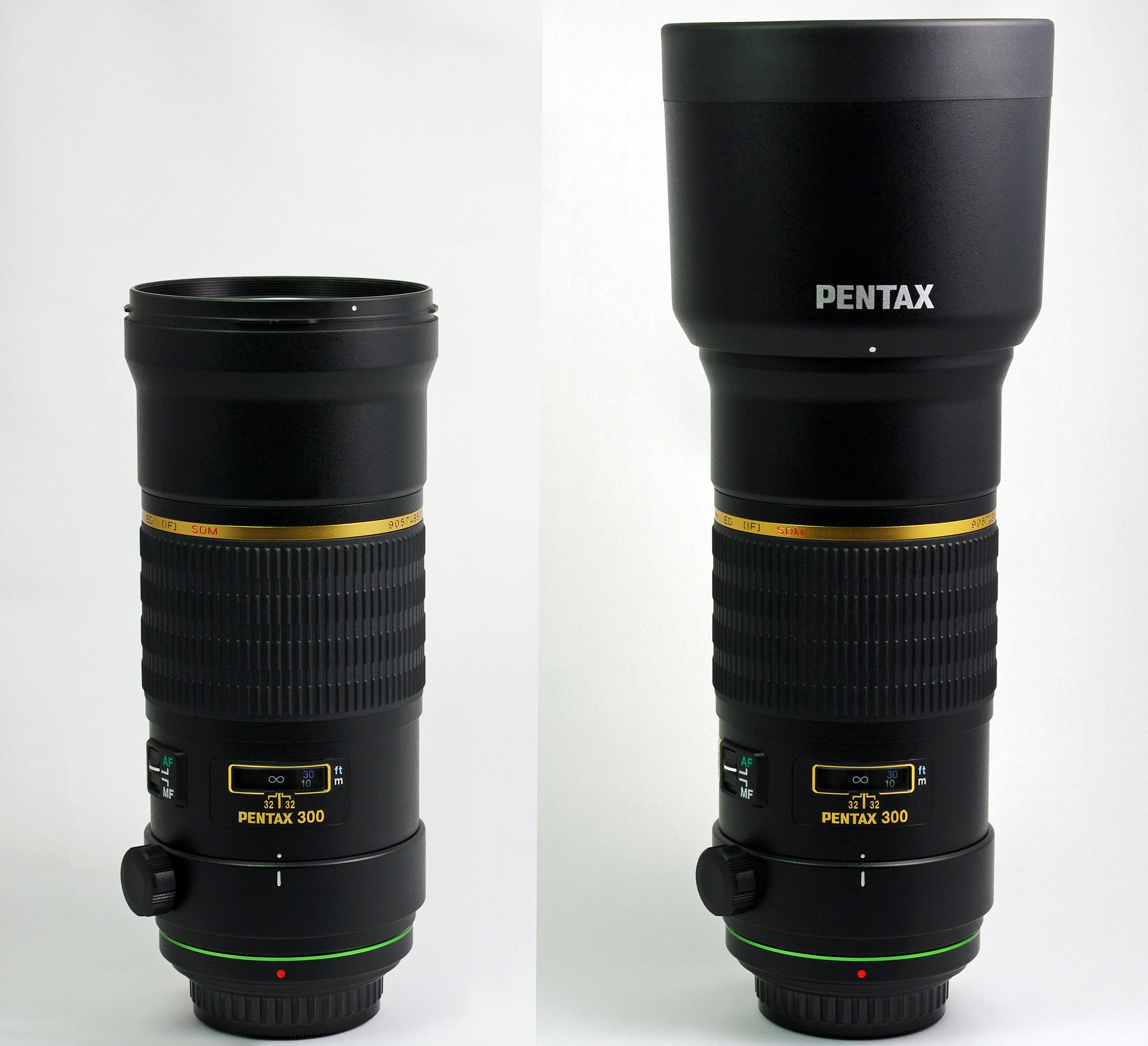
- Maker: Pentax

Technical data
- Type: Prime
- Focal length: 300mm
- Focal length (35mm equiv.): 450mm
- Aperture (max/min): f/4 / f/32
- Close focus distance: 140 centimetres (55 in)
- Max. magnification: 0.24x
- Diaphragm blades: 9
- Construction: 8 elements in 6 groups

Features
- Manual focus override: Yes Yes
- Ultrasonic motor: Yes Yes
- Weather-sealing: Yes Yes
- Unique features: Quick-shift focus, SP (Super Protect) coating, filter window, detachable tripod mount
- Application: Supertele

Physical
- Max. length: 184 millimetres (7.2 in)
- Diameter: 83 millimetres (3.3 in)
- Weight: 1,070 grams (38 oz)
- Filter diameter: 77mm

Accessories
- Lens hood: PH-RBK 77 mm

Angle of view
- Diagonal: 5.4 °

Retail info
- MSRP: 1,399.95 USD

The smc PENTAX-DA* 1:4 300mm ED [IF] SDM is a supertele prime lens for Pentax K-mount. It uses Pentax' silent SDM motor for autofocus on compatible cameras (K10D and K200D upwards), and has Quick Shift Focus to allow manual adjustments in autofocus mode.

== Reception ==
Photozone reviewed the lens favourably, stating, "in terms of resolution and contrast the lens is able to produce very good results straight from the max. aperture setting" and "mechanical quality of the lens is absolutely exceptional thanks to high quality materials and seals against dust and moisture". Of the ultrasonic autofocus motor, they wrote that it "works like a breeze - it's both fast and almost silent." Overall, they concluded that the lens is "highly desirable lens for sports and wildlife photographers."

ColorFoto wrote the lens had outstanding sharpness over the entire frame, even wide open, and PopPhoto.com said that "images shot in the field were satisfyingly contrasty and sharp."
