= GomSpace =

Nanosatellite manufacturing company

- Industry: Aerospace
- Founded: 1 January 2007 in Denmark
- Fate: Active
- Headquarters: Aalborg, Denmark
- Key people: Carsten Drachmann (CEO)
- Products: CubeSat nanosatellites, satellite constellation operations
- Number of employees: 133 (2020)
- Website: gomspace.com/home.aspx

GomSpace is a manufacturer and operator of nanosatellites for customers in the defense, academic, government and commercial markets. GomSpace's services include systems integration, nanosatellite platforms, constellation operations management and miniaturised radio technology. The company serves customers in more than 50 countries.

== History ==
GomSpace was founded in January 2007 and it is headquartered in Denmark. Their critical, enthusiastic and analytical approach to technology gave them the nick name Grumpy Old Men in academic circles, shortened to GOM which later became the beginning letters of company name. The company has subsidiaries in Sweden, North America and Luxembourg. In 2016, GomSpace became listed on Nasdaq in Sweden and GomSpace Sweden was founded.

In October 2016, GomSpace bought the Swedish company NanoSpace from the Swedish Space Corporation. NanoSpace is developing MEMS-based miniature ion thruster for satellite navigation. using ionized xenon as a propellant. In 2018, NanoSpace changed name to GomSpace Sweden.

GomSpace has signed several contracts with the Luxembourg Government to develop advanced satellite operations facilities in Luxembourg. In 2021 the company signed a major deal to build and operate the Scout CubeMAP constellation, an advanced climate monitoring system. GomSpace has also collaborated to complete several research projects with universities and industrial partnerships.

== See also ==
- GOMX-3
- GOMX-4B
- GOMX-5
- UASAT
- Breizh Reconnaissance Orbiter
