= Cygnus NG-17 =

2022 American resupply spaceflight to the ISS

NG-17
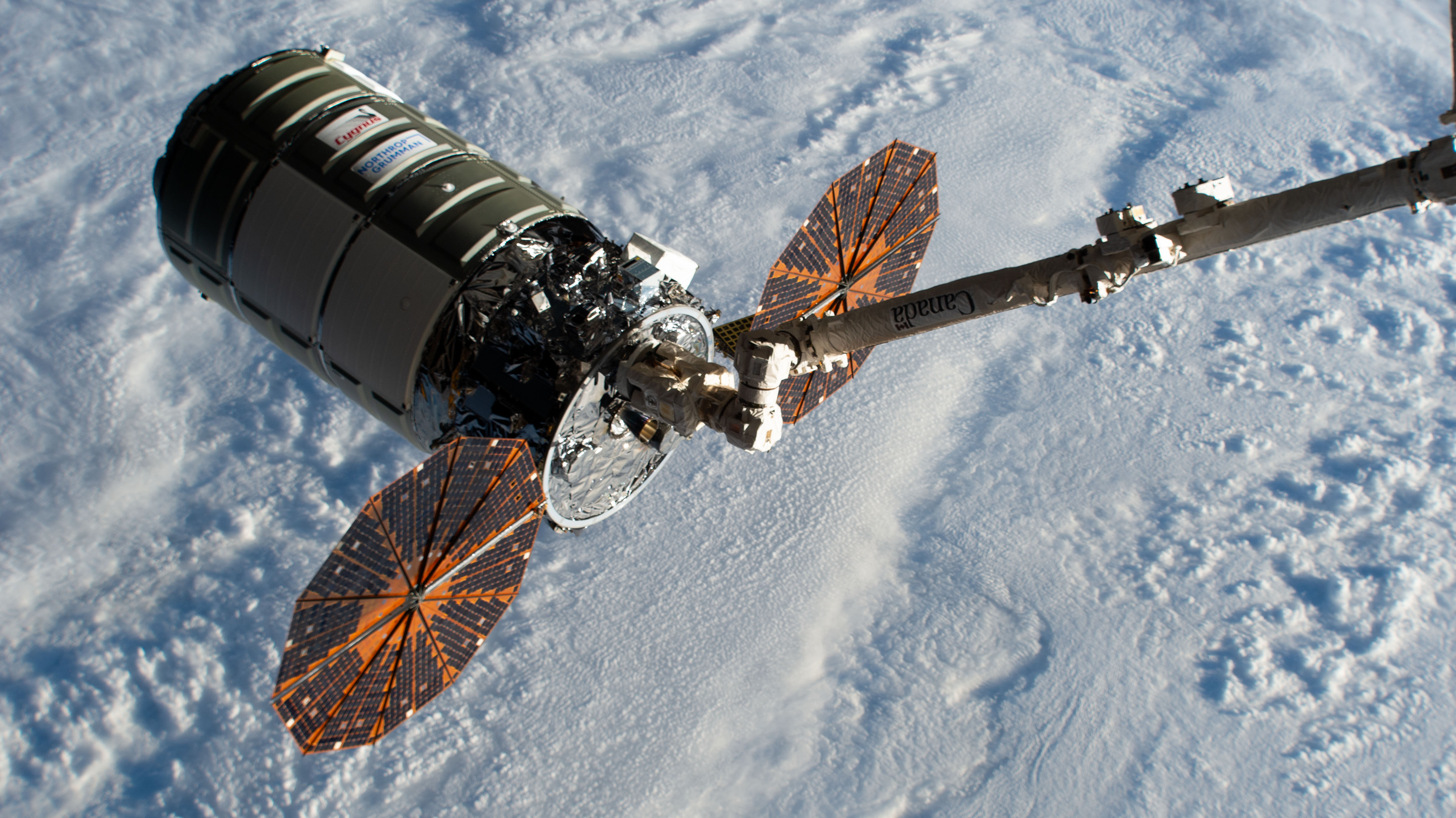
- S.S. Piers Sellers after arrival at the ISS
- Names: CRS NG-17; CRS OA-17 (2016–2018)
- Mission type: ISS resupply
- Operator: Northrop Grumman
- COSPAR ID: 2022-015A
- SATCAT no.: 51712
- Website: Cygnus NG-17
- Mission duration: 119 days, 13 hours, 14 minutes

Spacecraft properties
- Spacecraft: S.S. Piers Sellers
- Spacecraft type: Enhanced Cygnus
- Manufacturer: Northrop Grumman; Thales Alenia Space
- Launch mass: 8,050 kg (17,750 lb)
- Payload mass: 3,729 kg (8,221 lb)

Start of mission
- Launch date: 19 February 2022, 17:40:03 UTC (12:40:03 pm EST)
- Rocket: Antares 230+
- Launch site: MARS, Pad 0A

End of mission
- Disposal: Deorbited
- Decay date: 29 June 2022, 06:55 UTC

Orbital parameters
- Reference system: Geocentric orbit
- Regime: Low Earth orbit
- Inclination: 51.66°

Berthing at ISS
- Berthing port: Unity nadir
- RMS capture: 21 February 2022, 09:44 UTC
- Berthing date: 21 February 2022, 12:02 UTC
- Unberthing date: 28 June 2022, 07:00 UTC
- RMS release: 28 June 2022, 11:07 UTC
- Time berthed: 126 days, 18 hours, 58 minutes

Cargo
- Mass: 3,729 kg (8,221 lb)
- Pressurised: 3,651 kg (8,049 lb)
- Unpressurised: 78 kg (172 lb)
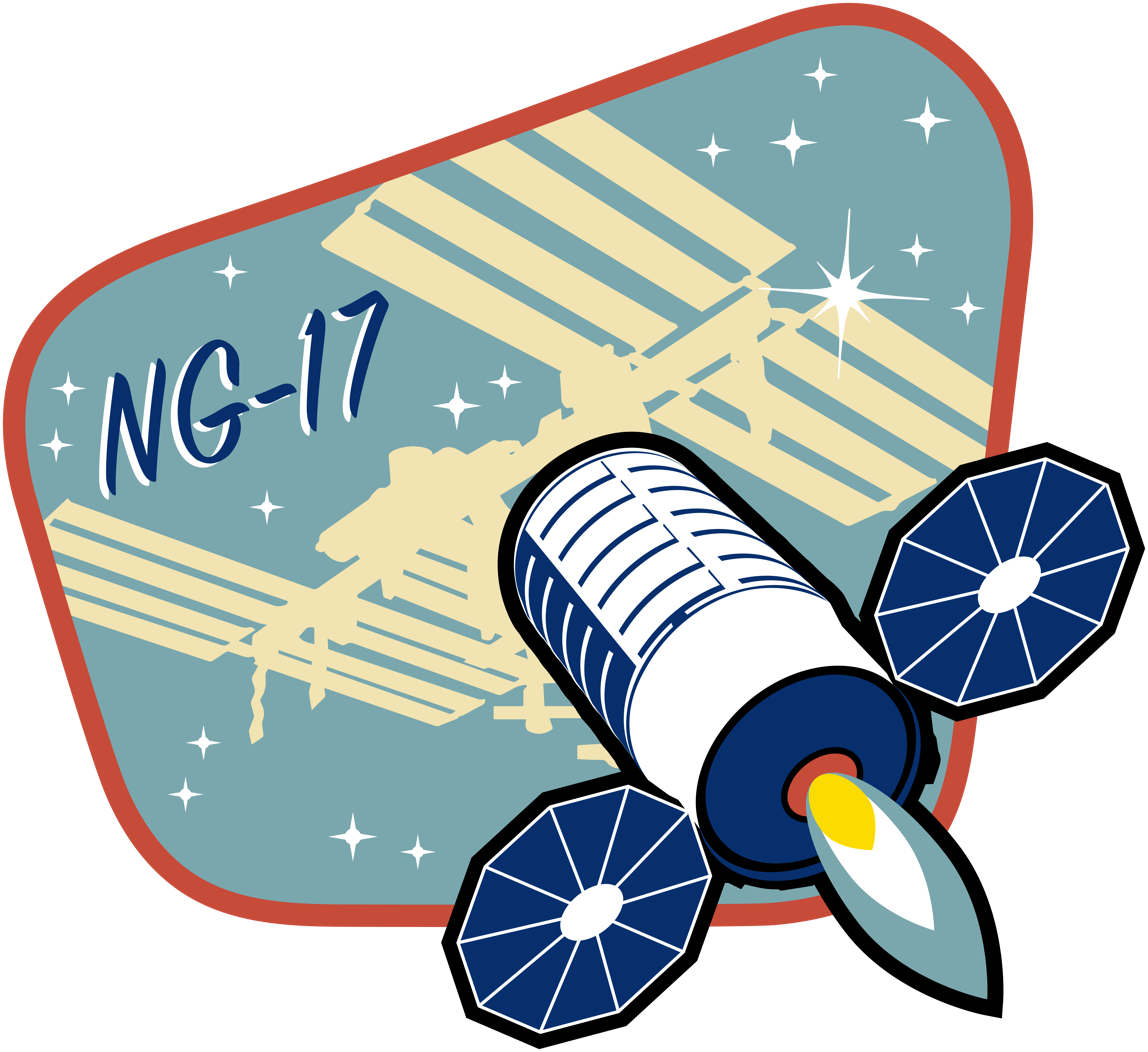
- NASA mission patch Commercial Resupply Services Cygnus flights

NG-17, previously known as OA-17, was the seventeenth flight of the Northrop Grumman robotic resupply spacecraft Cygnus and its sixteenth flight to the International Space Station (ISS) under the Commercial Resupply Services (CRS) contract with NASA. The mission launched on 19 February 2022 at 17:40:03 UTC. It was the sixth launch of Cygnus under the CRS-2 contract.

Orbital ATK’s space division (now part of Northrop Grumman Space Systems) and NASA jointly developed a new space transportation system to provide commercial cargo resupply services to the International Space Station (ISS). Under the Commercial Orbital Transportation Services (COTS) program, Orbital ATK designed, acquired, built, and assembled these components: Antares, a medium-class launch vehicle; Cygnus, an advanced spacecraft using a Pressurized Cargo Module (PCM) provided by industrial partner Thales Alenia Space and a Service Module based on the Orbital GEOStar satellite bus.

== History ==
NG-17 was the sixth Cygnus mission under the Commercial Resupply Services-2 contract.

Production and integration of Cygnus spacecraft are performed in Dulles, Virginia. The Cygnus service module is mated with the pressurized cargo module at the launch site, and mission operations are conducted from control centers in Dulles, Virginia and Houston, Texas.

== Spacecraft ==
This was the twelfth flight of the Enhanced-sized Cygnus PCM. Northrop Grumman named this spacecraft after Piers Sellers, in celebration of his role in assembling the International Space Station.

== Manifest ==
Cygnus spacecraft is loaded with 3,651 kg (8,049 lb) of research, hardware, and crew supplies.

- Crew supplies: 1,352 kg (2,981 lb)
- Science investigations: 896 kg (1,975 lb)
- Spacewalk equipment: 60 kg (130 lb)
- Vehicle hardware: 1,308 kg (2,884 lb)
- Computer resources: 35 kg (77 lb)

== ISS reboost ==
Aside from the orbital delivery, Cygnus performed the program's first operational reboost of the ISS. The space station's orbit needs to be changed from time to time as it naturally falls back in Earth's atmosphere. The ISS will change its attitude by about 90 degrees before executing the Cygnus reboost on 18 June 2022.

On 20 June 2022 at 15:20 UTC, Cygnus NG-17 gimbal engine was scheduled to fire for 5 minutes and 1 second but the firing was aborted after 5 seconds.

On Saturday, June 25, 2022 at 17:42 UTC, Northrop Grumman’s Cygnus completed its first limited reboost of the International Space Station. Cygnus’ gimbaled delta velocity engine was used to adjust the space station’s orbit through a reboost of the altitude of the space station. The maneuver lasted 5 minutes, 1 second and raised the station’s altitude 1/10 of a mile at apogee and 5/10 of a mile at perigee.

== See also ==
- Uncrewed spaceflights to the International Space Station
