= Honeywell Aerospace, Cambridge =

Satellite technology, space sciences and telecommunications company

COM DEV International Ltd.
- Logo of COM DEV International, before acquisition by Honeywell International Ltd.
- Formerly: COM DEV International Ltd.
- Type: Limited corporation
- Industry: Aerospace components Telecommunications
- Founded: 1974
- Founder: Dr. Val O'Donovan; Dr. Chandra Kudsia
- Headquarters: Cambridge, Ontario, Canada
- Key people: Michael Pley, CEO (2010); Gary Calhoun, CFO (2002); Dr. Roberta Bondar, Board member (2008); Terry Reidel, Chair; Michael Williams, COM DEV International Products
- Products: Aerospace research and manufacturing Space sciences Telecommunication products
- Parent: Honeywell

COM DEV International was a satellite technology, space sciences, and telecommunications company based in Cambridge, Ontario, Canada. The company had branches and offices in Ottawa, the United States, the United Kingdom, China and India.

COM DEV developed and manufactured specialized satellite systems, including microwave systems, switches, optical systems, specialized satellite antennas, as well as components for the aviation and aerospace industry. COM DEV also produced custom equipment designs for commercial, military and civilian purposes, as well as providing contract research for the space sciences.

== History ==
COM DEV International was founded in 1974 and specialized in microwave technology for the aviation and aerospace industry. The company would go on to become a leader in space satellite componentry and hardware, specializing in telecommunication systems; a global designer and builder of telecommunication components and systems for space satellites; as well as one of Canada's largest sources of spacecraft instrumentation.

In 2001, its space products division opened an approximate $7-million Surface Acoustic Wave (SAW) development and manufacturing laboratory in its Cambridge facility.

In 2005, it purchased the EMS Technologies Space Science optical division in Ottawa, formerly CAL Corporation, from MacDonald, Dettwiler and Associates for $5 million.

In 2007, it purchased a Passive Microwave division in El Segundo, California, for $8.75 million. In 2010, it purchased Ottawa-based space instrument supplier Routes AstroEngineering for $1.7 million. Later that year, it established a subsidiary called exactEarth offering global ship tracking data services. In 2015, it purchased MESL Microwave of Edinburgh, Scotland. Also that year, it entered the waveguide market with the purchase of Pacific Wave Systems (PWS) of Garden Grove, California.

On November 15, 2015, Honeywell announced that it would acquire COM DEV, which would become part of Honeywell's Defense and Space business. On February 4, 2016, Honeywell announced that it had completed the acquisition, and COM DEV has since been renamed Honeywell Cambridge.

== Products ==
Since the 1990s, the company has manufactured components for satellites including:

- Telemetry communication and control modules
- Multiplexer (MUX) switching networks and filters
- Crossovers for microwave
- Modulators, regulators
- Surface acoustic wave filters
- Assemblies for airline telecommunications
- Special satellite antennas

== Projects ==
The company has developed and built satellites assemblies or components for over 900 satellite missions, including:

- Sapphire (satellite) Optical Imaging Payload
- Swarm (spacecraft) Canadian Electric Field Instrument
- ExactView 1
- Terra (Satellite) MOPITT Instrument
- CASSIOPE e-POP Radio Receiver Instrument
- Dextre Force Moment Sensors
- Upper Atmosphere Research Satellite WINDII Instrument
- Far Ultraviolet Spectroscopic Explorer Fine Error Sensor
- SCISAT-1 MAESTRO instrument and CALTRAC Startracker
- Odin (Satellite) Odin-OSIRIS Instrument
- Herschel Space Observatory HIFI Local oscillator Source Unit
- Jason-1 CALTRAC Startrackers
- Genesis (spacecraft) CALTRAC Startrackers
- Formosat-2 CALTRAC Startrackers
- Nozomi (spacecraft) Thermal Plasma Analyser
- Akebono (satellite) Suprathermal ion Mass Spectrometer
- Freja (satellite) Cold Gas Analyser and Auroral Imager
- Interbol Ultraviolet Auroral Imager
- Viking (satellite) Ultraviolet Imager
- CloudSat
- Meteosat

Upcoming missions include:

- Maritime Monitoring and Messaging Micro-Satellite (M3MSat)
- James Webb Space Telescope (JWST) Fine Guidance Sensor and Near Infrared Imaging and Slitless Spectrograph

Past projects have also included an Automatic Identification System (AIS) validation nanosatellite launched on an Antrix PSLV-C9 vehicle from the Satish Dhawan Space Centre in Sriharikota, India in April 2008. The AIS experimental spacecraft was built under contract by the University of Toronto Institute for Aerospace Studies (UTIAS) Space Flight Laboratory (SFL), which also designated with the responsibility for its operation.

== Research and development ==
COM DEV provided research and development work in aeronautics and space technology. Many modules of the company are used in many well-known space probes and satellites. COM DEV was known for cooperating with major space agencies, including NASA, the European Space Agency (ESA), JAXA, Indian Space Research Organisation and the Canadian Space Agency (CSA).

== See also ==
- Boeing Canada
- Bombardier Aerospace
- Canadian Space Agency
- CMC Electronics
- Héroux-Devtek
- MacDonald, Dettwiler and Associates
- Spar Aerospace
- Viking Air
- Val O'Donovan
