= PW-Sat =

Series of Polish satellites

PW-Sat is a series of Polish CubeSats designed and built by students at the Warsaw University of Technology in conjunction with the Faculty of Power and Aeronautical Engineering of Warsaw University of Technology, the Space Research Centre of Polish Academy of Sciences, and the European Space Agency. As of 1 January 2024, there have been 2 PW-Sats with a third in development. The first PW-Sat was the first Polish artificial satellite which was launched 13 February 2012 from ELA-1 at Guiana Space Centre aboard Italian-built Vega launch vehicle during its maiden voyage. After their graduation, the team that developed the original PW-Sat have also worked to develop the subsequent missions, establishing a private company named PW-Sat to design and manufacturer the PW-Sats, all of which test novel deorbiting methods, with the overall goal of the program to develop solutions to space debris.

== PW-Sat1 ==
PW-Sat
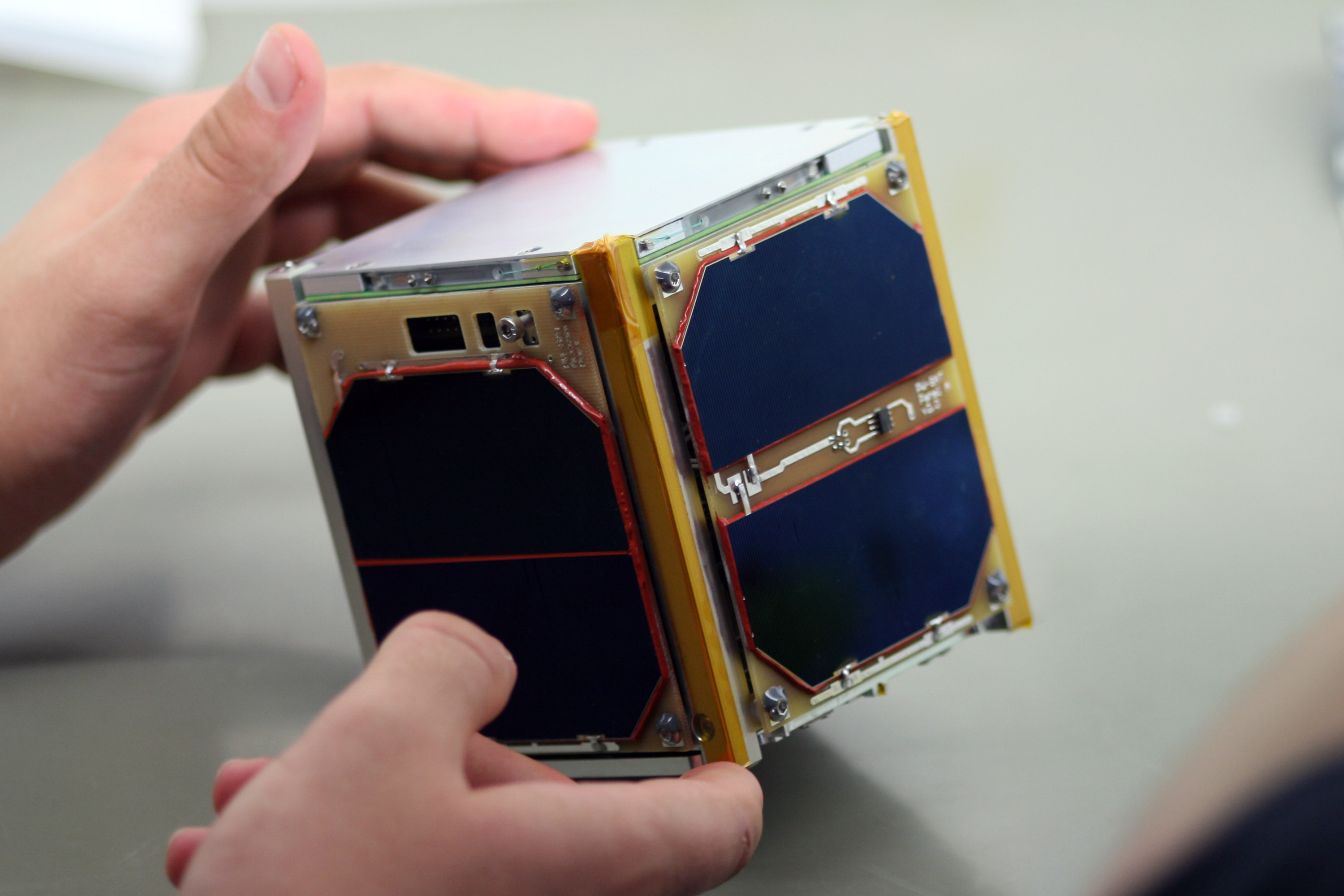
- PW-Sat was the first Polish-built satellite.
- Mission type: Technology
- Operator: Polish Academy of Sciences (Space Research Centre)
- COSPAR ID: 2012-006G
- SATCAT no.: 38083
- Mission duration: 1 year

Spacecraft properties
- Spacecraft type: 1U CubeSat
- Manufacturer: Warsaw University of Technology (Faculty of Power and Aeronautical Engineering)
- Launch mass: 1 kilogram (2.2 lb)

Start of mission
- Launch date: 13 February 2012, 10:00:00 UTC
- Rocket: Vega VV01
- Launch site: Kourou ELV
- Contractor: Arianespace

End of mission
- Decay date: 28 October 2014

Orbital parameters
- Reference system: Geocentric
- Regime: Low Earth
- Perigee altitude: 300 kilometres (190 mi)
- Apogee altitude: 1,023 kilometres (636 mi)
- Inclination: 69.47 degrees
- Period: 97.83 minutes
- Epoch: 9 November 2013, 01:40:17 UTC

=== Development ===
The PW-Sat project was created in 2004 when group of students from Warsaw University of Technology decided to build satellite compatible with CubeSat 1U standard. Initially planned for a 2007 launch, delays in the development of the Vega caused the mission to be postponed until 2012. The cost of the project was estimated to be 200,000 Polish zloty (63,205 USD), with funding coming from the university's budget, as well as from an agreement between Poland and the European Space Agency.

=== Hardware ===
PW-Sat1 was a 10x10x10 cm cube with a mass of 1 kg. It is equipped with the following hardware:

- EPS: power module
- ANTS: antenna management system
- COM: communication compartment
- PLD: elastic solar cells management sub-system
- OBC: main computer
- Access port
- Elastic solar cells (part of primary mission)
- Atmospheric drag device (part of primary mission)
- AX.25 transceiver
- CW beacon transmitting on 145.901 MHz for tracking by radio amateurs

=== Mission ===
PW-Sat1 was launched on 13 February 2012, 10:00 UTC from ELA-1 at Guiana Space Centre (Kourou, French Guiana) aboard the maiden flight of the Vega rocket, together with LARES and ALMASat-1 satellites and 6 other CubeSats built by various European universities. It was deployed 1 hour 10 minutes into the flight from the P-POD-2 container, along with the ROBUSTA and MaSat-1 CubeSats. First signals from satellite were received around 12:10 UTC by radio amateurs. The first Polish reception of PW-Sat1's signals came at 12:15 UTC by CAMK in Warsaw.

PW-Sat1 was planned stay in orbit until 2013, when it was planned to perform a destructive atmospheric reentry. The satellite used a large amount of the batteries' stored energy while performing tasks early in the mission. This battery depletion, combined with orbital maneuvers designed so the satellite would fly over Poland, delayed deployment of the tail. Commands of tail deployment were sent from Earth on April and May 2012, but PW-Sat did not respond to the commands. Due to a hardware issue with the communication module (that was discovered on a few other CubeSats using the same model) communication with the satellite was problematic and the tail couldn't be extended. PW-Sat1 reentered the atmosphere on 28 October 2014. Development of a successor, PW-Sat2, begun in September 2013 and was launched in December 2018.

== PW-Sat2 ==
PW-Sat2
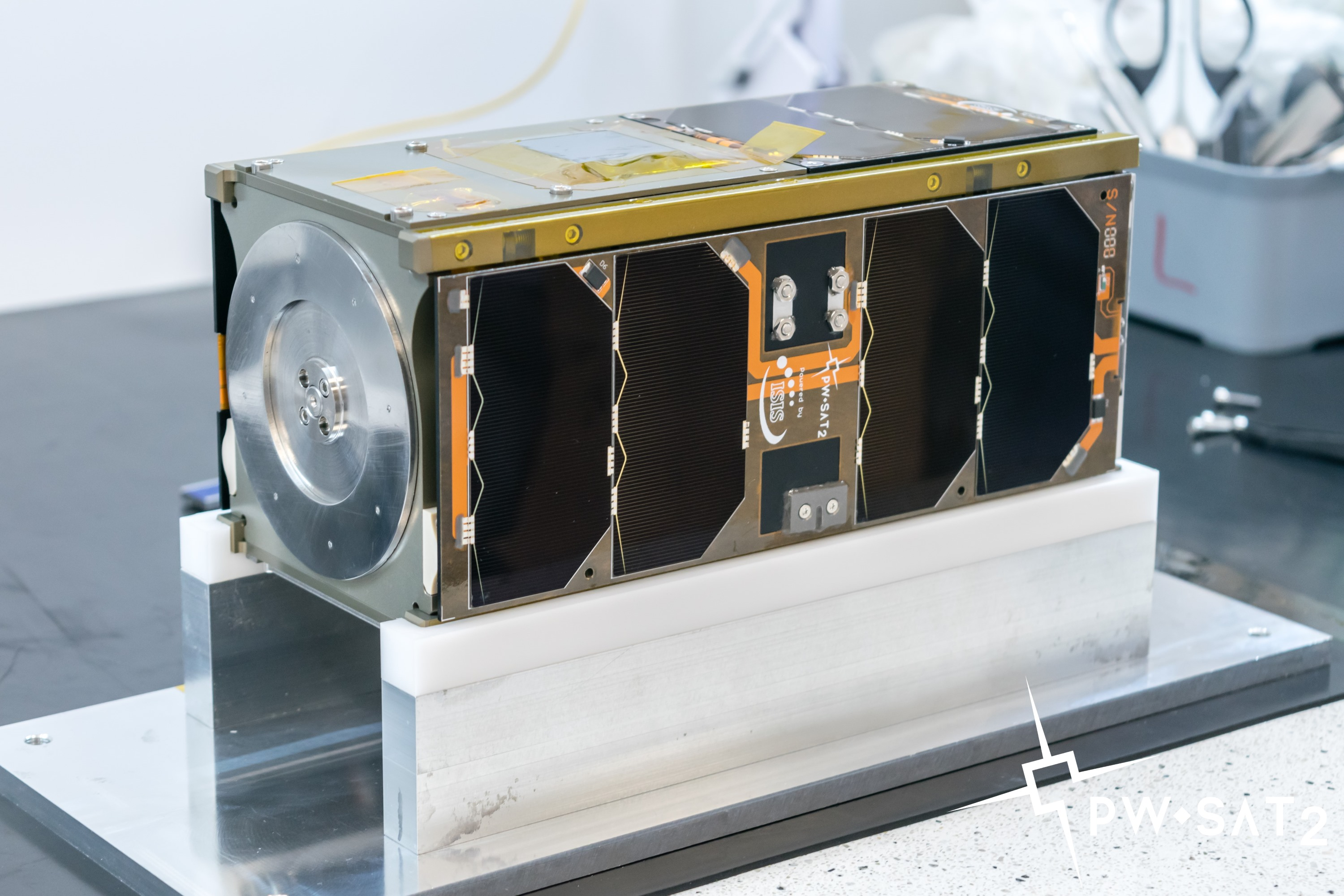
- PW-Sat2 After its completion on 28 February 2018
- Mission type: Technology
- COSPAR ID: 2018-099-BJ
- SATCAT no.: 38083

Spacecraft properties
- Spacecraft type: 2U CubeSat
- Manufacturer: Warsaw University of Technology (Faculty of Power and Aeronautical Engineering)

Start of mission
- Launch date: 3 December 2018
- Rocket: Falcon 9 v1.1 FT
- Launch site: Vandenberg Air Force Base SLC-4E
- Contractor: Innovative Space Logistics B.V.

End of mission
- Last contact: 22 September 2019
- Decay date: 23 February 2021

Orbital parameters
- Reference system: Geocentric
- Regime: Low Earth
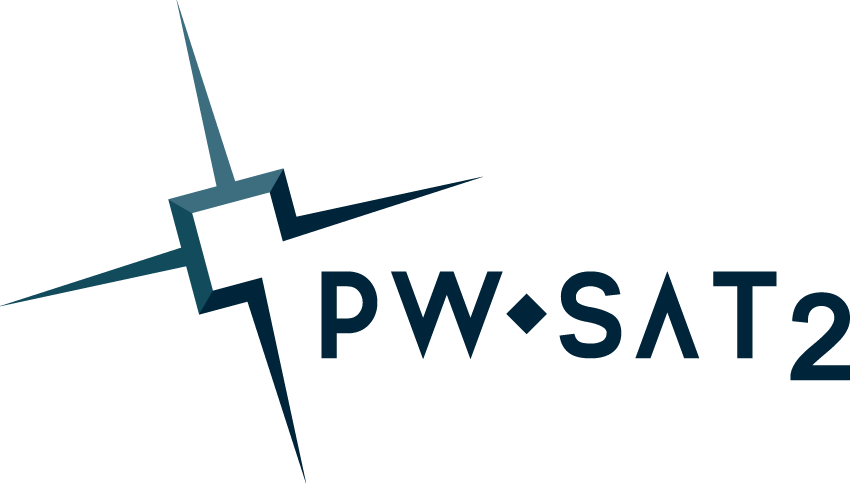
- PW-Sat2 mission patch

=== Development ===
PW-Sat1's successor, PW-Sat2 was also developed by students at the Warsaw University of Technology immediately after the launch of PW-Sat1. The cubesat's primary payload was a 2 m by 2 m solar sail technology demonstration, meant to de orbit PW-Sat2 as a proof of concept for the technology. However, PW-Sat2 would only deploy its sail after a 40-day window so that its secondary payload, an experimental sun sensor, can perform its tests.

=== Mission ===
PW-Sat2 was launched aboard the Falcon 9 SSO-A's SERPA flight on 3 December 2018. It performed experiments with its secondary payloads and after the allotted 40 day window deployed its primary payload. The sail deployed successfully, however, pictures taken with the on-board camera showed damage to the foil. Although the exact cause of the sail's failure is not known, the PW-Sat2 team's "leading hypothesis is that temperature gradient between sail foil and arms leads to tension and breaking the foil." Despite the damage, the sail successfully shortened the time in orbit from 25 years down to around 2 years. PW-Sat2 deorbited on 23 February 2021.

== PW-Sat3 ==
=== Development ===
A third cubesat, the PW-Sat3 is currently under development by students at the Warsaw University of Technology. This rendition of the satellite is expected for launch aboard an RFA One on the launch vehicle's second ever launch. PW-Sat3 will be controlled by a KP Labs Antelope on-board computer running Oryx modular flight software.

The PW-Sat3's mission requires a change in altitude and as such required the design of an onboard thruster. The cold gas thruster uses butane as a propellant and will perform station-keeping maneuvers and at the end of the mission will perform the deorbiting maneuver.

The satellite's launch has been significantly delayed to no earlier than late 2025 due to delays in the development of the RFA One.

=== Hardware ===
Besides the aforementioned butane thruster, the 3U CubeSat will also carry the following hardware:

- AOCS system: The primary payload, a custom AOCS system that will be used during propulsion maneuvers to align the satellite in the optimal orientation.
- EHS sensors: The secondary experiment, a series of Earth Horizon Sensors made from industrial IR matrixes.
- Camera module: Similarly to PW-Sat2, PW-Sat3 will have an onboard camera to document the probe and its experiments.
- The development team is planning on having an onboard transponder that would allow amateur radio enthusiasts to broadcast radio packets and to possibly download on-demand low-resolution images from the camera. After the completion of its scientific payloads, PW-Sat3's radio will emit a series of commemorative radio beacons before final deorbiting. The development team has also promised that all telemetry frame formats will be thoroughly described and made publicly available on the project website, as well as decoders and the accompanying software application.

== See also ==
- BRITE
- Lem (BRITE-PL)
- Heweliusz (BRITE-PL)
- List of Polish satellites
