= Heweliusz (satellite) =

Polish satellite part of the BRITE constellation

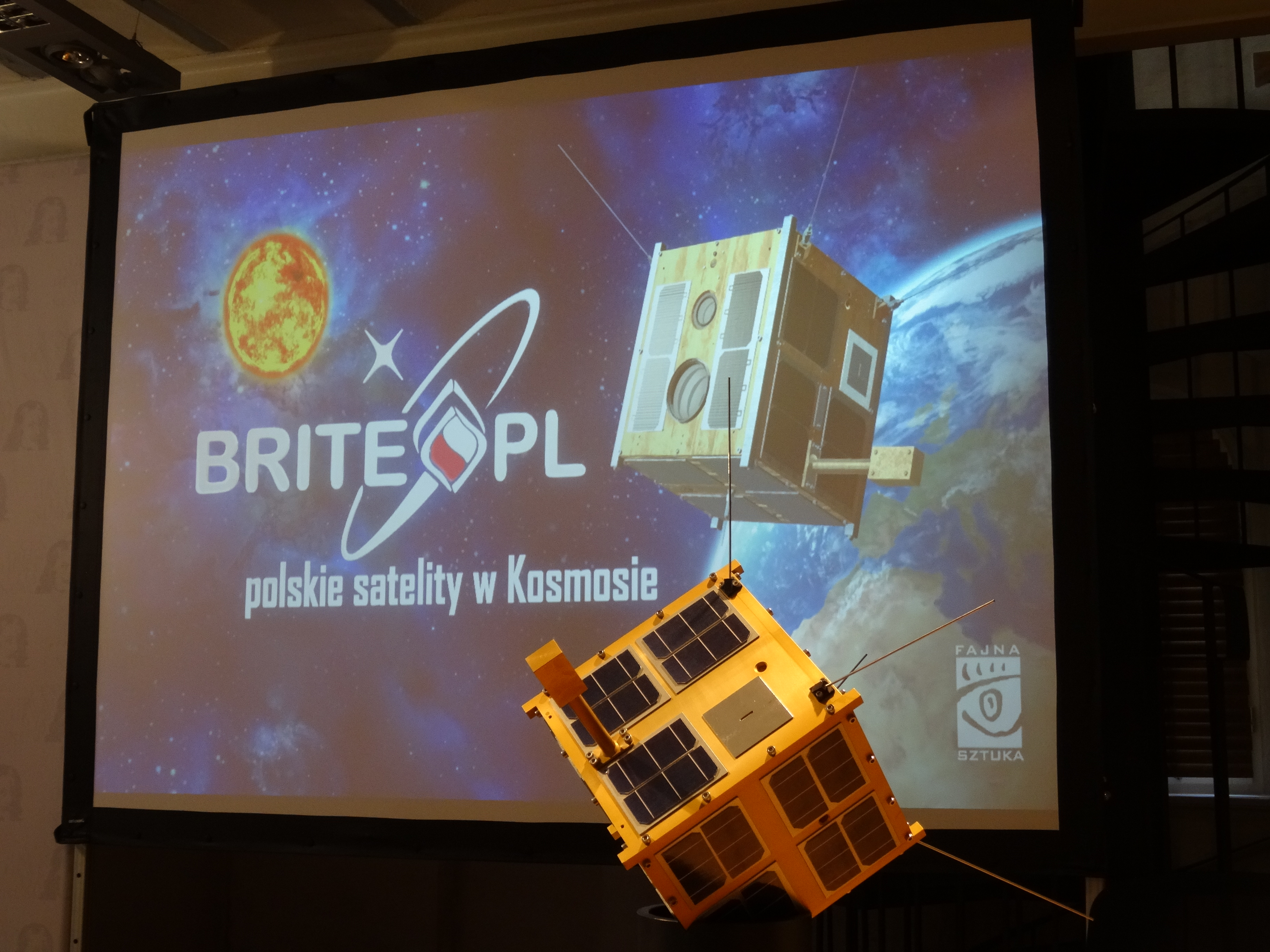
- A replica of Heweliusz
- Mission type: Astronomy
- Operator: Centrum Astronomiczne im. Mikołaja Kopernika PAN
- COSPAR ID: 2014-049B
- SATCAT no.: 40119
- Mission duration: 12 years, 1 month and 27 days (in progress)

Spacecraft properties
- Bus: GNB
- Manufacturer: Space Research Centre
- Launch mass: 7 kilograms (15 lb)

Start of mission
- Launch date: 19 August 2014, 03:15 UTC
- Rocket: Chang Zheng 4B
- Launch site: Taiyuan Launch Complex 9
- Contractor: China Great Wall Industry Corporation

Orbital parameters
- Reference system: Geocentric
- Regime: Low Earth

Heweliusz (also called BRITE-PL) is the second Polish scientific satellite launched in 2014 as part of the Bright-star Target Explorer (BRITE) programme. The spacecraft was launched aboard a Chang Zheng 4B rocket in August 2014. Heweliusz is an optical astronomy spacecraft built by the Space Research Centre of the Polish Academy of Sciences and operated by Centrum Astronomiczne im. Mikołaja Kopernika PAN; it is one of two Polish contributions to the BRITE constellation along with the Lem satellite. It is named after Johannes Hevelius. It was launched as a secondary payload on the same rocket as the Chinese Gaofen 2 earth-observation satellite.

== Features ==
Heweliusz is the third Polish satellite (after PW-Sat and Lem) ever launched. Along with Lem, TUGSAT-1, UniBRITE-1 and BRITE-Toronto, it is one from a constellation of six nanosatellites of the BRIght-star Target Explorer project, operated by a consortium of universities from Canada, Austria and Poland.

Heweliusz was developed and manufactured by the Space Research Centre of the Polish Academy of Sciences between 2010 and 2012, based around the Generic Nanosatellite Bus, and had a mass at launch of 7 kilograms (15 lb). The satellite is used, along with four other operating spacecraft, (Note: The sixth satellite, BRITE-Montreal, is possibly lost.) to conduct photometric observations of stars with an apparent magnitude of greater than 4.0 as seen from Earth. Heweliusz was one of two Polish BRITE satellites launched, along with the Lem spacecraft. Four more satellites—two Austrian and two Canadian—were launched at different dates.

Heweliusz observes the stars in the red color range whereas Lem does it in blue. Due to the multicolour option, geometrical and thermal effects in the analysis of the observed phenomena are separated. None of the much larger satellites, such as MOST and CoRoT, has this colour option; this is crucial in the diagnosis of the internal structure of stars. Heweliusz photometrically measures low-level oscillations and temperature variations in stars brighter than visual magnitude (4.0), with unprecedented precision and temporal coverage not achievable through terrestrial based methods.

== Launch ==
The Heweliusz satellite was launched as a secondary payload on a Long March 4B rocket, whose primary payload was the Chinese Gaofen 2 earth-observation satellite. The launch was subcontracted to the China Great Wall Industry Corporation and China Aerospace Science and Technology Corporation (CASC). The launch took place at 03:15 UTC on 19 August 2014 from the Taiyuan Satellite Launch Center, and the rocket deployed all of its payloads successfully.

Although the other satellites in the BRITE constellation used the Canadian XPOD nanosatellite deployer, Heweliusz uses an indigenous Polish system. The DRAGON nanosatellite deployer was designed specifically for this mission by the Space Research Centre, in collaboration with the SRC spinoff company Astronika. Development, manufacturing, testing, and integration of the system took only two months.

== See also ==
- TUGSAT-1
- UniBRITE-1
- BRITE-Toronto
- BRITE-Montreal
- Lem (BRITE-PL)
