= SARAL =

Indian earth observation satellite

- An artist's rendering of SARAL satellite
- Names: Satellite with Argos and ALtiKa
- Mission type: Earth observation
- Operator: ISRO
- COSPAR ID: 2013-009A
- SATCAT no.: 39086
- Website: https://isro.gov.in/
- Mission duration: 5 years (planned); 13 years, 6 months and 20 days (in progress)

Spacecraft properties
- Spacecraft: SARAL
- Bus: IMS-2
- Manufacturer: Indian Space Research Organisation / CNES
- Launch mass: 407 kg (897 lb)
- Dimensions: 1 m x 1 m x 0.6 m
- Power: 850 watts

Start of mission
- Launch date: 25 February 2013, 12:31 UTC
- Rocket: Polar Satellite Launch Vehicle-CA, PSLV-C20
- Launch site: Satish Dhawan Space Centre, First Launch Pad (FLP)
- Contractor: Indian Space Research Organisation
- Entered service: 25 June 2013

Orbital parameters
- Reference system: Geocentric orbit
- Regime: Sun-synchronous orbit
- Perigee altitude: 790 km (490 mi)
- Apogee altitude: 791 km (492 mi)
- Inclination: 98.54°
- Period: 100.54 minutes

Instruments
- Advanced Data Collection System ("Argos-3") (A-DCS); Ka-band Altimeter (ALtiKa); Doppler Orbitography and Radiopositioning Integrated by Satellite (DORIS); Laser Retroreflector Array (LRA)

SARAL (Satellite with ARgos and ALtiKa) is a cooperative altimetry technology mission of Indian Space Research Organisation (ISRO) and Centre National d'Études Spatiales (CNES). SARAL performs altimetric measurements designed to study ocean circulation and sea surface elevation.

== Mission ==
A CNES / ISRO MOU (Memorandum of Understanding) on the SARAL mission was signed on 23 February 2007. The SARAL mission is complementary to the Jason-2 mission of NASA / NOAA and CNES / EUMETSAT. It will fill the gap between Envisat and the Sentinel-3 mission of the European Copernicus Programme (Global Monitoring for Environment and Security - GMES programme). The combination of two altimetry missions in orbit has a considerable impact on the reconstruction of sea surface height (SSH), reducing the mean mapping error by a factor of 4. SARAL was also used to demonstrate a ground link with an AWS terminal in preparation for the Gaganyaan programme.

== Instruments ==
The SARAL payload module was provided by CNES: ALtiKa (Ka-band altimeter), Doppler Orbitography and Radiopositioning Integrated by Satellite (DORIS), Laser Retroreflector Array (LRA), and ARGOS data collection system. ISRO is responsible for the satellite bus (Indian Mini Satellite-2), launch (Polar Satellite Launch Vehicle), and operations of the satellite.

=== ARGOS Advanced-Data Collection System (A-DCS) ===
Argos-3 of French National Space Agency (CNES), manufactured by Thales Alenia Space (TAS). ARGOS contributes to the development and operational implementation of the global ARGOS Advanced-Data Collection System. It will collect a variety of data from ocean buoys to transmit the same to the ARGOS ground segment for subsequent processing and distribution.

=== Ka-band altimeter (ALtiKa) ===
ALtiKa, the altimeter and prime payload of the SARAL mission, is the first spaceborne altimeter to operate at Ka-band. It was built by the French National Space Agency, CNES. The payload is intended for oceanographic applications, operates at 35.75 GHz. ALTIKA is set to take over ocean-monitoring from Envisat. It is the first to operate at such a high frequency, making it more compact and delivering better performance than the previous generation.

While existing satellite-borne altimeters determine sea level by bouncing a radar signal off the surface and measuring the return-trip time, ALtiKa operates at a high frequency in Ka-band. The advantage of this is twofold. One, the atmosphere of Earth slows down the radar signal, so altimetry measurements are skewed and have to carry additional equipment to correct for this error. Since ALTIKA uses a different system, it does not have to carry an instrument to correct for atmospheric effects as current-generation altimeters do. ALtiKa gets around this problem by operating at a high frequency in Ka-band. Another advantage of operating at higher frequencies is greater accuracy. ALtiKa will measure ocean surface topography with an accuracy of 8 mm, against 2.5 cm on average using current-generation altimeters, and with a spatial resolution of 2 km. The disadvantage, however, is that high-frequency waves are extremely sensitive to rain, even drizzle. 10% of the data is expected to be lost. (Although this could be exploited to perform crude measurements of precipitation).

=== DORIS ===
DORIS (Doppler Orbitography and Radiopositioning Integrated by Satellite): DORIS is a dual-frequency tracking system (400 MHz and 2 GHz) based on network of emitting ground beacons spread all over the world.

=== Laser Retroreflector Array (LRA) ===
LRA is provided by CNES. The objective of LRA is to calibrate the precise orbit determination system and the altimeter system several times throughout the mission. The LRA is a passive system used to locate the satellite with laser shots from ground stations with an accuracy of a few millimeters. The reflective function is done by a set of 9 corner cube reflectors, with a conical arrangement providing a 150º wide field of view over the full 360° azimuth angle.

== Applications ==
SARAL data products is useful for operational as well as research user communities in many fields like:

- Marine meteorology and sea state forecasting
- Operational oceanography
- Seasonal forecasting
- Climate monitoring
- Ocean, Earth system and climate research
- Continental ice studies
- Protection of biodiversity
- Management and protection of marine ecosystem
- Environmental monitoring
- Improvement of maritime security

== Secondary payloads ==
The six secondary payloads manifested on this flight were:

• BRITE-Austria (CanX-3b) and UniBRITE (CanX-3a), both of Austria. UniBRITE and BRITE-Austria are part of the BRITE Constellation, short for "BRIght-star Target Explorer Constellation", a group of 6.5 kg, 20 cm x 20 cm x 20 cm nanosatellites who purpose is to photometrically measure low-level oscillations and temperature variations in the sky's 286 stars brighter than visual magnitude 3.5.

• Sapphire (Space Surveillance Mission of Canada), a minisatellite with a mass of 148 kg.

• NEOSSat (Near Earth Object Surveillance Satellite), a microsatellite of Canada with a mass of ~74 kg.

• AAUSAT3 (Aalborg University CubeSat-3), a student-developed nanosatellite (1U CubeSat) of AAU, Aalborg, Denmark. The project is sponsored by DaMSA (Danish Maritime Safety Organization).

• STRaND-1 (Surrey Training, Research and Nanosatellite Demonstrator), a 3U CubeSat (nanosatellite) of SSTL (Surrey Satellite Technology Limited) and the USSC (University of Surrey Space Centre), Guildford, United Kingdom. STRaND-1 has a mass of ~4.3 kg.

The University of Toronto arranged for the launch to carry three small satellites for universities as part of its Nanosatellite Launch Services program, designated NLS-8: BRITE-Austria, UniBRITE and AAUSat3. The three NLS satellites used the XPOD (Experimental Push Out Deployer) separation mechanism of UTIAS/SFL for deployment. The STRaND-1 nanosatellite was deployed with the ISIPOD CubeSat dispenser of ISIS (Innovative Solutions In Space).

== Launch ==
SARAL was successfully launched into a Sun-synchronous orbit (SSO) on 25 February 2013, at 12:31 UTC.

== See also ==
- TRISHNA
- Megha-Tropiques
