= TUGSAT-1 =

Austrian satellite part of the BRITE constellation

- Mission type: Astronomy
- Operator: Graz University of Technology
- COSPAR ID: 2013-009F
- SATCAT no.: 39091
- Mission duration: Elapsed: 13 years, 1 month, 15 days

Spacecraft properties
- Bus: GNB
- Manufacturer: University of Toronto
- Launch mass: 7 kilograms (15 lb)

Start of mission
- Launch date: 25 February 2013, 12:31 UTC
- Rocket: PSLV-CA C20
- Launch site: Satish Dhawan FLP
- Contractor: ISRO; UTIAS

Orbital parameters
- Reference system: Geocentric
- Regime: Low Earth
- Perigee altitude: 776 kilometres (482 mi)
- Apogee altitude: 790 kilometres (490 mi)
- Inclination: 98.62 degrees
- Period: 100.37 minutes
- Epoch: 8 November 2013, 11:26:32 UTC

TUGSAT-1, also known as BRITE-Austria and CanX-3B, is the first Austrian satellite. It is an optical astronomy spacecraft operated by the Graz University of Technology as part of the international BRIght-star Target Explorer programme.

== Details ==
TUGSAT-1 was manufactured by the University of Toronto based on the Generic Nanosatellite Bus, and had a mass at launch of 7 kilograms (15 lb) (plus another 7 kg for the XPOD separation system). The spacecraft is cube-shaped, with each side measuring 20 centimetres (7.9 in). The satellite will be used, along with five other spacecraft, to conduct photometric observations of stars with apparent magnitude of greater than 4.0 as seen from Earth. TUGSAT-1 was one of the first two BRITE satellites to be launched, along with the Austro-Canadian UniBRITE-1 spacecraft. Four more satellites, two Canadian and two Polish, were launched at later dates.

== Launch ==
The TUGSAT-1 spacecraft was launched through the University of Toronto's Nanosatellite Launch System programme, as part of the NLS-8 launch, along with UniBRITE-1 and AAUSAT3. The NLS-8 launch was subcontracted to the Indian Space Research Organisation (ISRO), who placed the satellites into orbit using a Polar Satellite Launch Vehicle (PSLV) in the PSLV-CA configuration, flying from the First Launch Pad at the Satish Dhawan Space Centre. The NLS spacecraft were secondary payloads on the rocket, whose primary mission was to deploy the Franco-Indian SARAL ocean research satellite. Canada's Sapphire and NEOSSat-1 spacecraft, and the United Kingdom's STRaND-1, were also carried by the same rocket under separate launch contracts. The launch took place at 12:31 UTC on 25 February 2013, and the rocket deployed all of its payloads successfully.

== See also ==
- UniBRITE-1
- BRITE-Toronto
- BRITE-Montreal
- Lem (BRITE-PL)
- Heweliusz (BRITE-PL)
