= Lem (satellite) =

Polish scientific artificial satellite

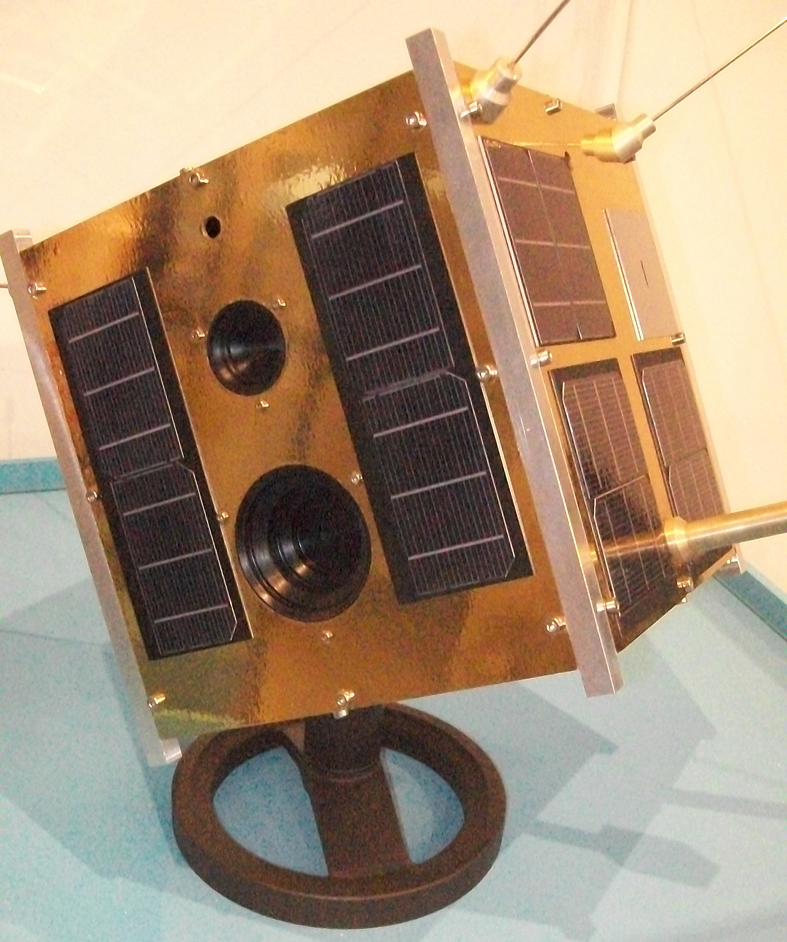
- Mission type: Astronomy
- Operator: Centrum Astronomiczne im. Mikołaja Kopernika PAN
- COSPAR ID: 2013-066R
- SATCAT no.: 39431

Spacecraft properties
- Bus: GNB
- Manufacturer: Space Research Centre
- Launch mass: 7 kilograms (15 lb)

Start of mission
- Launch date: 21 November 2013, 07:10:11 UTC
- Rocket: Dnepr
- Launch site: LC-13, Yasny
- Contractor: ISC Kosmotras

Orbital parameters
- Reference system: Geocentric
- Regime: Low Earth

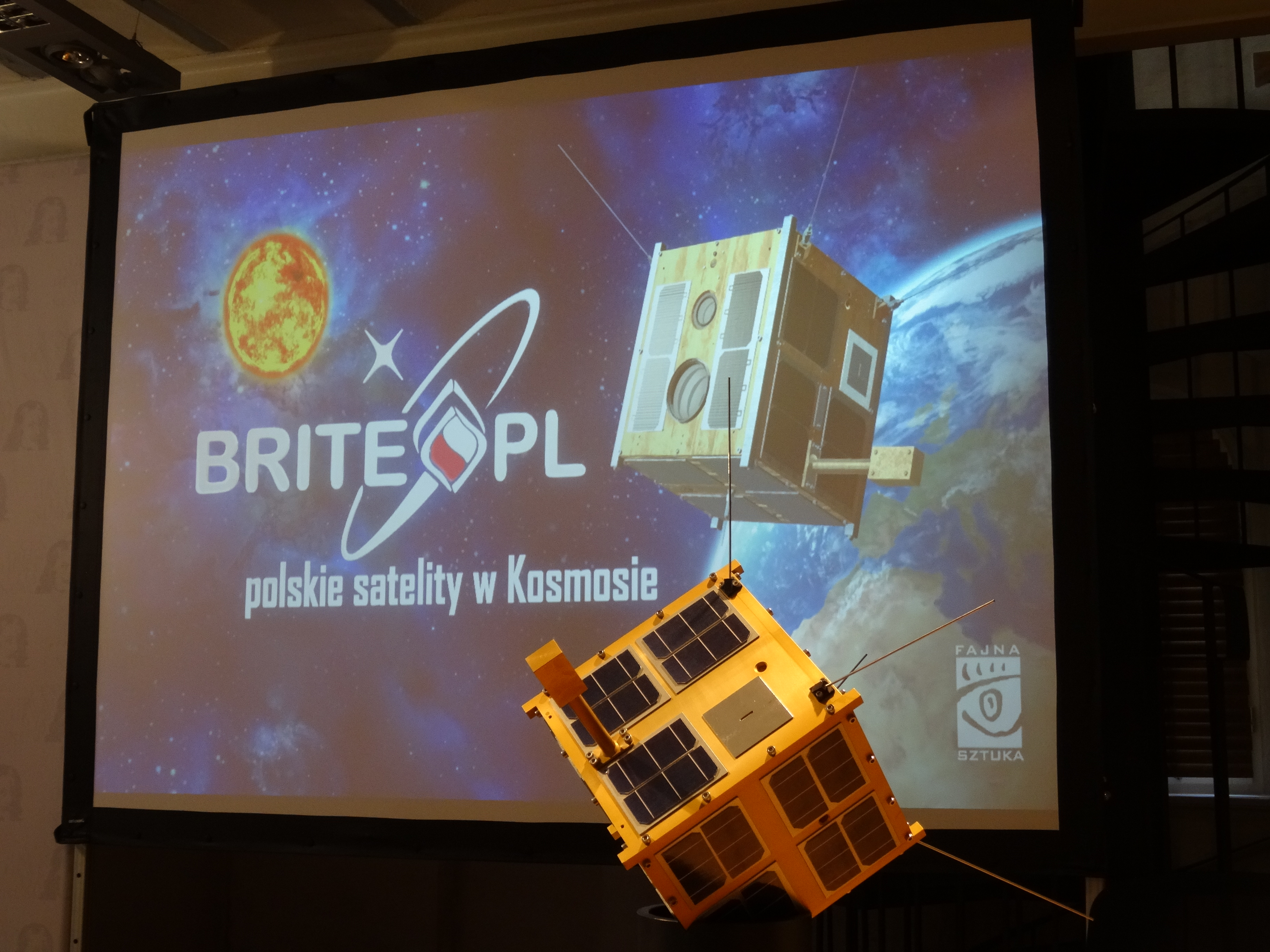
A replica of Heweliusz, similar to Lem

Lem (also called BRITE-PL) is the first Polish governmental artificial satellite. (Note: PW-Sat, a student designed and built cubesat was the first Polish satellite, although the government had no say in its creation) It was launched in November 2013 as part of the Bright-star Target Explorer (BRITE) programme. The spacecraft was launched aboard a Dnepr rocket. Named after the Polish science fiction writer Stanisław Lem, it is an optical astronomy spacecraft built by the Space Research Centre of the Polish Academy of Sciences and operated by Centrum Astronomiczne im. Mikołaja Kopernika PAN; one of two Polish contributions to the BRITE constellation along with the Heweliusz satellite.

== Features ==
Lem is the first Polish scientific satellite, and the second (after PW-Sat) ever launched. Along with Heweliusz, TUGSAT-1, UniBRITE-1 and BRITE-Toronto, it is one from a constellation of six nanosatellites of the BRIght-star Target Explorer project, operated by a consortium of universities from Canada, Austria and Poland.

Lem was developed and manufactured by the Space Research Centre of the Polish Academy of Sciences in 2011, based around the Generic Nanosatellite Bus, and had a mass at launch of 7 kilograms or 15 pounds (plus another 7 kg for the XPOD separation system). The satellite is used, along with four other operating spacecraft, (Note: The sixth satellite, BRITE-Montreal, is possibly lost.) to conduct photometric observations of stars with an apparent magnitude brighter than 4.0 as seen from Earth. Lem was one of two Polish BRITE satellites launched, along with the Heweliusz spacecraft. Four more satellites—two Austrian and two Canadian—were launched at different dates.

== Mission ==
Lem observes the stars in the blue color range, whereas Heweliusz does it in red. Due to the multicolour option, geometrical and thermal effects in the analysis of the observed phenomena are separated. None of the much larger satellites, such as MOST and CoRoT, has this colour option; this is crucial in the diagnosis of the internal structure of stars. Lem photometrically measures low-level oscillations and temperature variations in stars brighter than visual magnitude (4.0), with unprecedented precision and temporal coverage not achievable through terrestrial based methods.

== Launch ==
The Lem satellite was launched from the Russian Yasny air base aboard a Dnepr through the BRITE-PL Project satellite launch programme established in 2009 by the Space Research Centre of the Polish Academy of Sciences and the Nicolaus Copernicus Astronomical Centre of the Polish Academy of Sciences in cooperation with University of Toronto. The launch was subcontracted to the Russian Ministry of Defence which launched the satellites using Dnepr rocket from the Yasny air base along with 33 other satellites. The launch took place at 07:10 (UTC) on 21 November 2013, and the rocket deployed all of its payloads successfully.

== See also ==
- TUGSAT-1
- UniBRITE-1
- BRITE-Toronto
- BRITE-Montreal
- Heweliusz (BRITE-PL)
