= Kerstin Fredga =

Swedish astronomer (1935–2025)

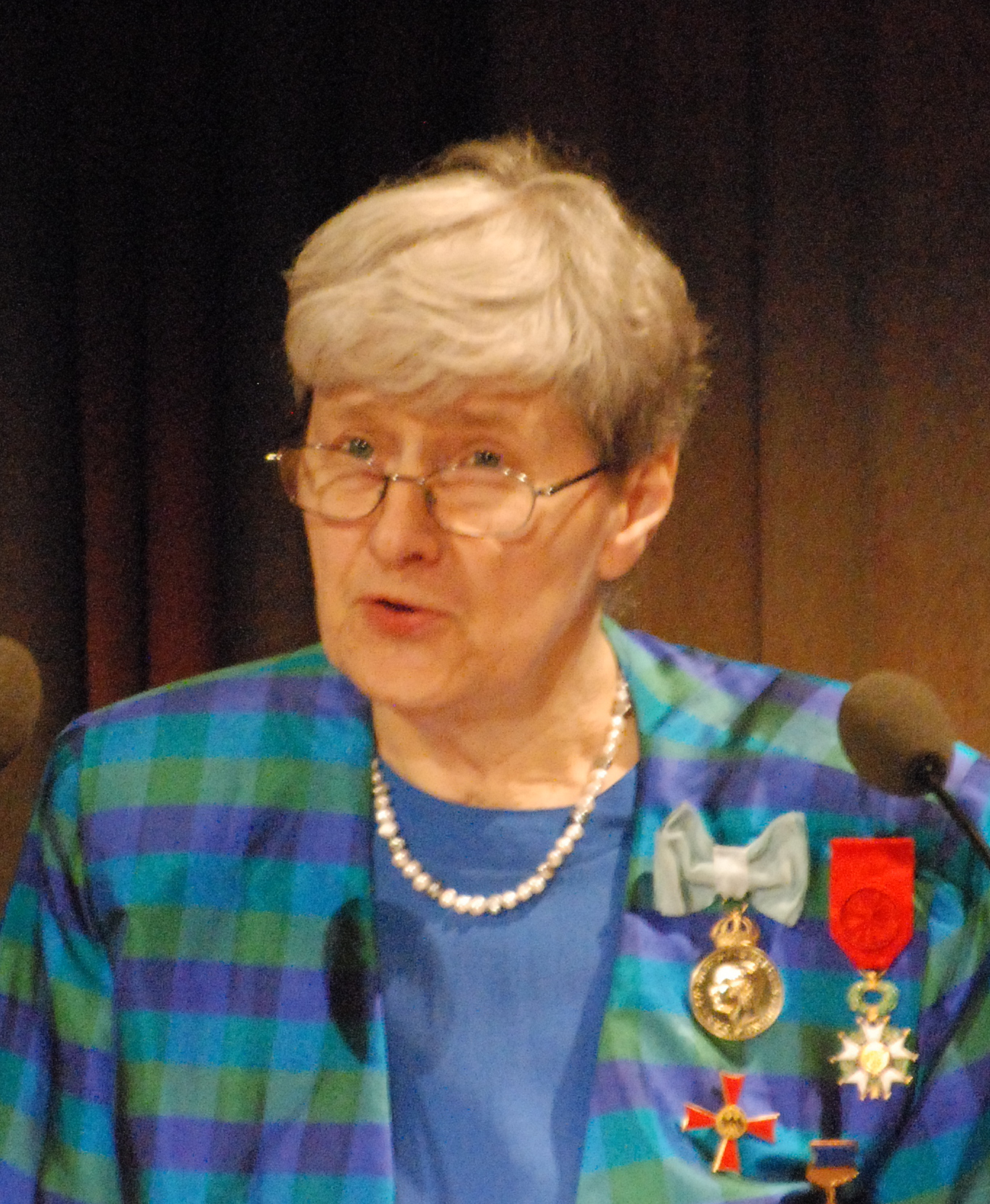
- Fredga in 2010
- Born: 16 November 1935
- Died: 24 September 2025 (aged 89)
- Occupations: Astronomer, spectroheliographer

Kerstin Fredga (16 November 1935 – 24 September 2025) was a Swedish astronomer and spectroheliographer whose research involves the spectra of the sun and other stars. She was the director of the Swedish National Space Agency and president of the Royal Swedish Academy of Sciences.

== Education and career ==
Fredga was born in Stockholm in 1935, one of five children of chemistry professor Arne Fredga and his wife, a kindergarten teacher, who encouraged her to pursue her interest in astronomy. In a 2003 interview with a Swedish popular astronomy magazine, she mentioned becoming interested in space and astronomy at 10–12 years old, as a schoolchild in Uppsala. After initially studying maths, physics, theoretical physics and astronomy at Uppsala University, she completed a Ph.D. in astronomy in 1962.

She began her career working at the Institute for Solar Physics on Capri, using a narrow wavelength of light to study the surface of the Sun and look for flares and other solar phenomena. After continued research on rocket-based ultraviolet solar observation at the Goddard Space Flight Center in the US in the mid-1960s, and in the Astronomical Institute and Space Research Laboratory of the University of Utrecht, she returned to Sweden, and in 1973 became a professor at Stockholm University, at the same time moving from research towards academic administration in the Swedish National Space Agency.

She was project scientist for Viking, Sweden's first satellite, which launched in 1986, and directed the agency for ten years beginning in 1989. She has also chaired the Space Science Council of the European Space Agency.

In a 2003 interview with a Swedish popular astronomy magazine, she expressed her views on the importance of continuing public interest in natural science and engineering, highlighting the planetarium Cosmonova in Stockholm, as well as her view on the importance of international collaboration within the field of astronomy, including Sweden's continued membership in ESA; however she also said that Sweden must continue "doing things at home" so as to not lose the "competency" they have in space science.

Fredga died on 24 September 2025, at the age of 89.

== Recognition ==
Fredga was elected to the Royal Swedish Academy of Sciences in 1978, and later became its president. She was also elected to the Royal Swedish Academy of Engineering Sciences in 1986, and to the Academia Europaea in 1988.

She was the 1983 recipient of the KTH Great Prize of the KTH Royal Institute of Technology, citing "her broad knowledge in astronomy and space physics as well as experiences from American space projects".

She was a recipient of the Order of the Seraphim size 12 ribbon in 1991, awarded by the Swedish Royal Family to "individuals who have performed outstanding acts of a humanitarian nature or of general benefit to society". She also received the French national order of the legion of honour and the order of merit of the federal republic of Germany.
