= Swedish Institute of Space Physics =

Swedish government agency

Coordinates: 67°50′27″N 20°24′36″E

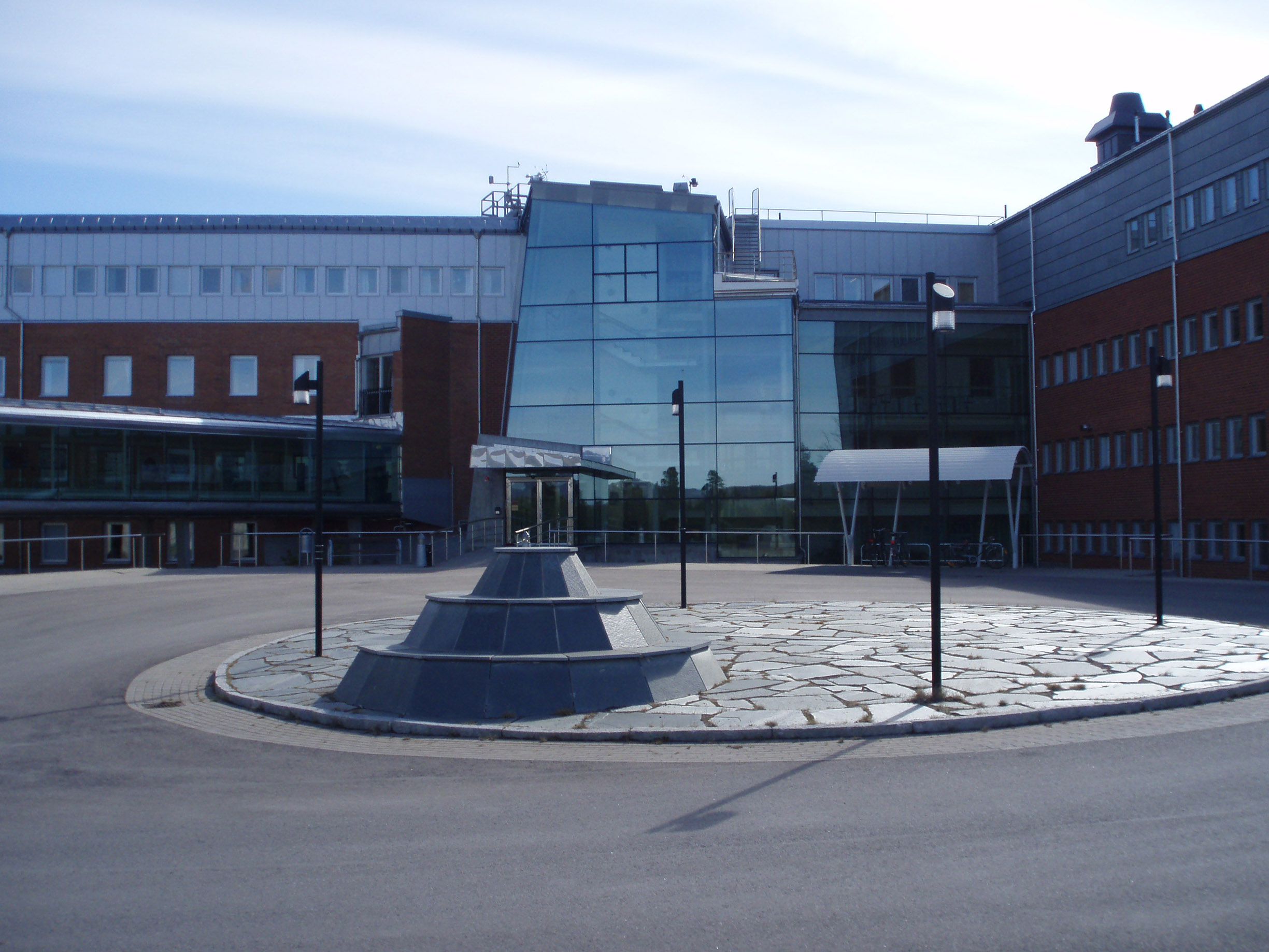
Main office, Kiruna

The Swedish Institute of Space Physics (Swedish: Institutet för rymdfysik, IRF) is a Swedish government agency. The institute's primary task is to carry out basic research, education and associated observatory activities in space physics, space technology and atmospheric physics.

== Foundation ==
The IRF was founded in 1957 and the first Kiruna-designed satellite experiment was launched in 1968. The institute has about one hundred employees and has its head office in Kiruna. Other offices are situated in Umeå, Uppsala and Lund.

IRF, originally the Kiruna Geophysical Observatory, began as a department within the Royal Swedish Academy of Sciences. It has been a public research institute since 1973, under the auspices of the Swedish Ministry of Education and Culture.

== Satellite experiments ==
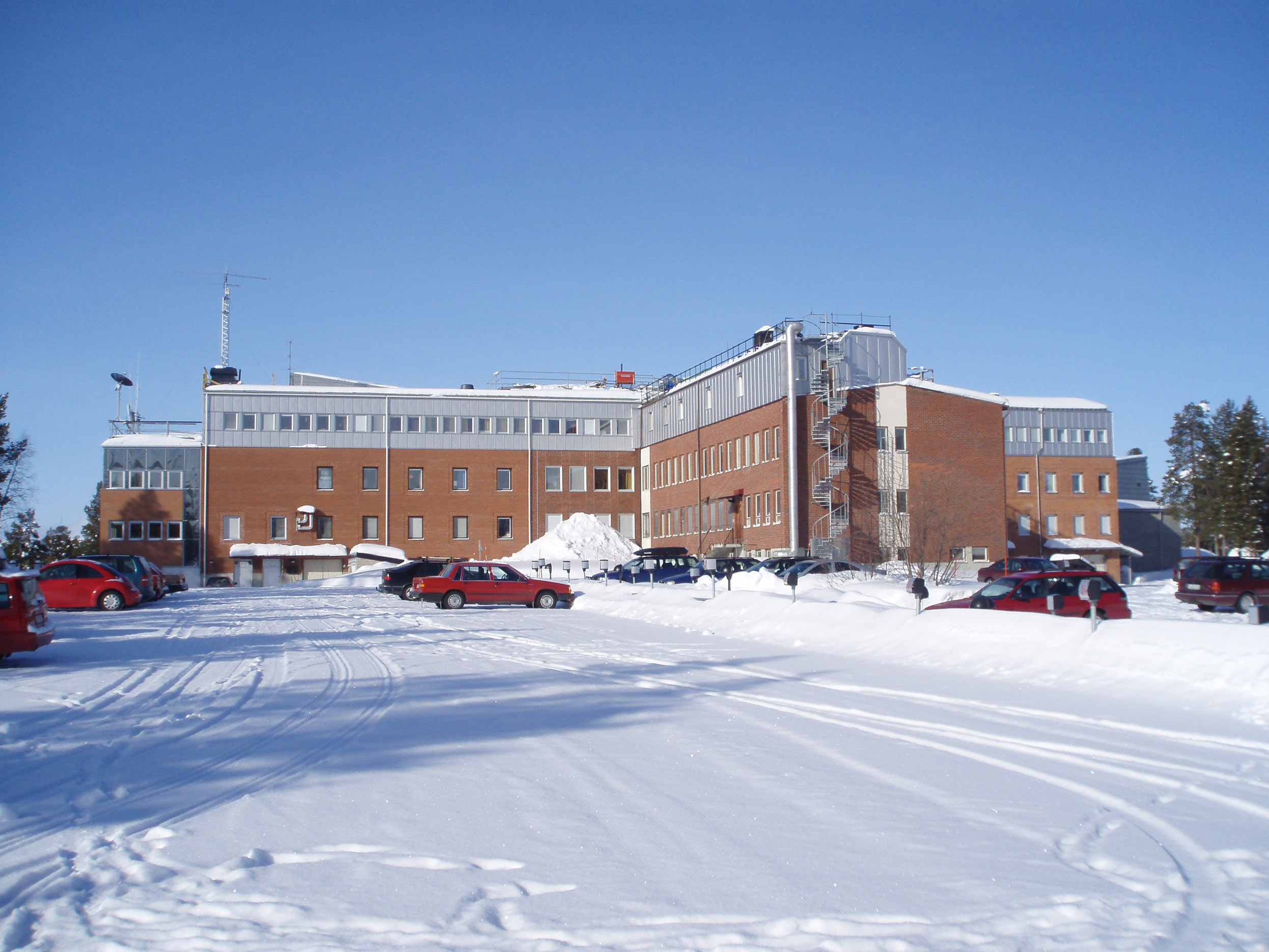
Swedish Institute of Space Physics and The Kiruna Space Campus

IRF participates in several international satellite projects. At present, data from satellite instruments are being analysed to help us better comprehend the plasma-physical processes in the solar wind and around comets and planets. For example, the Swedish Viking and Freja satellites, with equipment from IRF on board, have greatly increased our knowledge of the auroral processes in the Earth's magnetosphere, as have the microsatellites Astrid 1 and 2, launched in 1995 and 1998. IRF's own nano-satellite Munin (at 6 kg (13 lb) the smallest-ever research satellite) was launched in 2000. An IRF-built instrument on board the Indian satellite Chandrayaan-1 (launched 2008) collected data from the Moon and new techniques for making particle measurements in space were tested on the Swedish satellite mission Prisma (launched 2010).

IRF has instruments on board for example the following on-going satellite projects:

- Cluster (2000) is an ESA project with 4 satellites in formation to study the Earth's magnetosphere.
- Mars Express (2003) is an ESA mission to study Mars.
- Swarm (2013) is an ESA project with 3 satellites to study the Earth's magnetic field.
- BepiColombo (2018), a combined JAXA/European Space Agency mission to Mercury.
- Solar Orbiter (2020) is an ESA mission to study the solar wind and the Sun.
- JUICE (launched 2023), a European Space Agency mission to Jupiter and its icy moons.

Completed missions:

- Cassini (launched 1997), a combined NASA/ESA (European Space Agency) mission to Saturn and its moon Titan.
- Rosetta (2004) is one of ESA's cornerstone projects and has been studying comet 67P/Churyumov-Gerasimenko since 2014. The mission ended in late September 2016.
- Venus Express (2005) is an ESA satellite to study Venus and completed its mission in December 2014.

I RF in space 1968 ->

== Continuous measurements ==
Continuous measurements of the following are made at IRF

- Earth's magnetic field
- Aurora
- Cosmic radio noise
- Ionospheric parameters

== Ground-based auroral research ==
Experiments are conducted with research radars, such as those of the European Incoherent Scatter Scientific Association (EISCAT) with transmitters in Tromsø and on Svalbard. These are used for example to study the processes which cause the aurora. The three-dimensional structure of the aurora is studied with ALIS (Auroral Large Imaging System), a multi-station imaging system which uses tomographic reconstruction techniques, artificial intelligence and advanced IT.

== Atmospheric research ==
Atmospheric research at IRF focuses on studies of

- Ozone in the stratosphere
- Strato- and mesospheric clouds
- Strato- and mesospheric winds
- Coupling between different atmospheric layers (e.g. transport between troposphere and stratosphere) - propagation of mechanical waves

Radar, optical methods, sounding rockets and balloons are used for atmospheric studies. Continuous measurements are made of:

- Atmospheric trace gases (including ozone)
- Atmospheric winds
- Infrasonic waves.

== IRF SpaceLab ==
The IRF SpaceLab test facility, offers industry and research groups an opportunity to test and qualify space-related hardware for satellites, rockets, balloons and ground-based technology. IRF has been developing instruments for satellites, rockets and balloons since the late 1960s and has the necessary equipment to simulate the harsh environment these instruments face.

IRF SpaceLab

== See also ==
- Munin
- Swedish National Space Agency
- Swedish Space Corporation
- Esrange
- European Space Agency
- Government agencies in Sweden
