= SNSB =

SNSB may refer to:

- Scripps National Spelling Bee.
- Swedish National Space Board (SNSB), a name used until 2018. The current name in English is Swedish National Space Agency (SNSA).
