= Munin (satellite) =

Swedish nanosatellite

- Mission type: Auroral measurements
- Operator: Swedish Institute of Space Physics
- COSPAR ID: 2000-075C
- SATCAT no.: 26621
- Mission duration: 2 months, 12 days

Spacecraft properties
- Spacecraft type: CubeSat
- Launch mass: 6 kg
- Dimensions: 21 cm × 21 cm × 22 cm (8.3 in × 8.3 in × 8.7 in)
- Power: 6 watts

Start of mission
- Launch date: 2000-11-21
- Rocket: Delta II
- Launch site: Vandenberg Space Force Base

End of mission
- Disposal: Contact lost
- Declared: 2001-02-01
- Last contact: 2001-12-02

Orbital parameters
- Reference system: Elliptical polar orbit
- Altitude: 707 km
- Inclination: 96.5°
- Period: 110 minutes

Munin is a Swedish nanosatellite. It was launched on November 21, 2000 on a Delta II rocket from the Vandenberg Air Force Base in California, together with two other satellites. Munin was developed by the Swedish Institute of Space Physics in cooperation with students from Luleå University of Technology and Umeå University. Last contact was on December 2nd, 2001, after a manual CPU reset. The failure of the satellite was likely in the boot PROM.

== General information ==
- Dimensions
  - Size: 210 mm × 210 mm × 220 mm (8.3 in × 8.3 in × 8.7 in)
  - Mass: 6 kg (13 lb)
- Science
  - Combined ion and electron spectrometer
  - High energy particle detector
  - Miniature CCD camera intended for auroral imaging
- Onboard computer
  - CPU: Texas Instruments TMS320C50 at 40 MHz
  - RAM: 2 MB

Elliptical polar orbit. Perigee: 698 km, apogee: 1800 km.

== See also ==
- Swedish National Space Board
