= Sapphire (satellite) =

Canadian space surveillance satellite

- Mission type: Space surveillance
- Operator: Department of National Defence
- COSPAR ID: 2013-009C
- SATCAT no.: 39088

Spacecraft properties
- Bus: SSTL-150
- Manufacturer: MDA Corporation (prime); SSTL (bus); COM DEV International (optical payload)
- Launch mass: 148 kilograms (326 lb)

Start of mission
- Launch date: 25 February 2013, 12:31 UTC
- Rocket: PSLV-CA C20
- Launch site: Satish Dhawan FLP
- Contractor: ISRO

Orbital parameters
- Reference system: Geocentric
- Regime: Low Earth
- Perigee altitude: 778 kilometres (483 mi)
- Apogee altitude: 793 kilometres (493 mi)
- Inclination: 98.62 degrees
- Period: 100.43 minutes
- Epoch: 30 October 2013, 14:37:56 UTC

Sapphire is a Canadian space surveillance satellite which was launched in 2013. Sapphire was commissioned and integrated by MacDonald, Dettwiler and Associates (MDA) based on an SSTL-150 bus produced by Surrey Satellite Technology (SSTL) and an optical payload produced by COM DEV International.

== Details ==
Sapphire, Canada's first military satellite, is a small spacecraft designed to monitor space debris and satellites within an orbit 3,728 to 24,855 miles (6,000 to 40,000 kilometres) above Earth. The satellite has been providing data to the United States Space Surveillance Network since January 2014. The satellite has a mass of 148 kilograms (326 lb), and carries a three-mirror anastigmat to track artificial objects in medium Earth orbit to geosynchronous Earth orbit. ISRO's Ball Lock separation system IBL-298 was used for separating the satellite.

The optical system is based on the design of the Space-Based Visible (SBV) sensor. This telescope was developed for the Midcourse Space Experiment. The Charge-coupled device(CCD) used is a CCD47-20bi CCD sensor.

Following completion of its operational testing and certification, Sapphire began its five-year operational mission November 13, 2013.

== Launch ==
Sapphire was launched by the Indian Space Research Organisation (ISRO), using a PSLV-CA rocket, flight C20. The launch occurred at 12:31 on 25 February 2013, from the First Launch Pad at the Satish Dhawan Space Centre. Sapphire was a secondary payload on the rocket, the primary payload being the SARAL oceanography satellite. NEOSSat, UniBRITE-1, TUGSAT-1, AAUSAT3 and STRaND-1 were also launched aboard the same rocket.

== See also ==
- 2013 in spaceflight
- Science and technology in Canada
