= Borowiec Astrogeodynamic Observatory =

Coordinates: 52°16′37″N 17°04′29″E

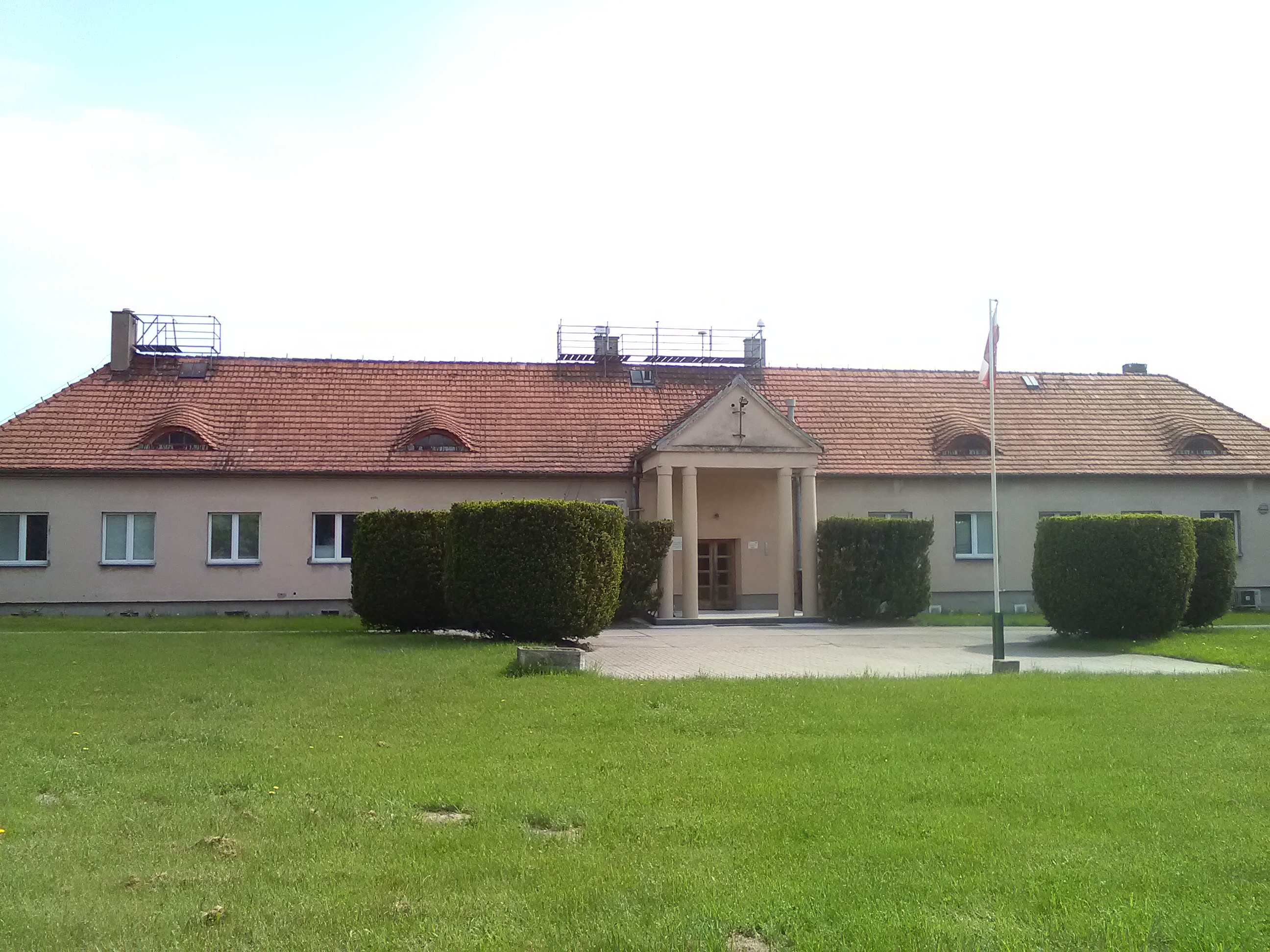
Borowiec Astrogeodynamic Observatory

The Borowiec Astrogeodynamic Observatory is an observatory that forms part of Space Research Centre located in Borówiec, Poland.
