= Freja (satellite) =

Swedish artificial satellite

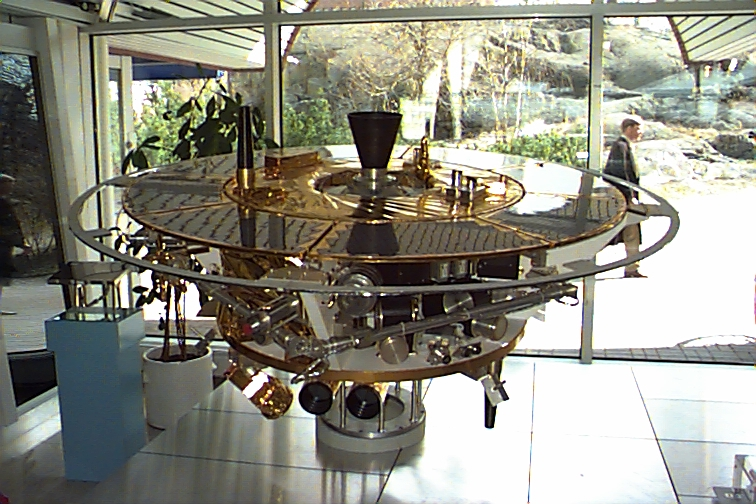
- Mockup of the Freja satellite, in the entrance hall of the Swedish Space Corporation in Solna, Sweden
- Mission type: Magnetospheric research
- Operator: Swedish National Space Board
- COSPAR ID: 1992-064A
- SATCAT no.: 22161
- Website: Freja at SCC
- Mission duration: Primary: 2 years, 8 months, 24 days Total: 4 years

Spacecraft properties
- Manufacturer: Swedish Space Corporation
- Dry mass: 214 kilograms (472 lb)
- Payload mass: 60 kilograms (130 lb)
- Power: 168 watts (nominal); 81 watts (payload)

Start of mission
- Launch date: October 6, 1992, 06:20:05 UTC
- Rocket: Chang Zheng 2C
- Launch site: Jiuquan LA-2B

End of mission
- Last contact: October 1996

Orbital parameters
- Reference system: Geocentric
- Regime: Low Earth
- Perigee altitude: 601 kilometres (373 mi)
- Apogee altitude: 1,756 kilometres (1,091 mi)
- Inclination: 63 degrees
- Period: 108.90 minutes
- Epoch: 6 October 1992, 23:19:19 UTC

FREJA was a Swedish satellite developed by the Swedish Space Corporation on behalf of the Swedish National Space Board. It was piggyback launched on a Long March 2C launch vehicle from Jiuquan Satellite Launch Center in China on October 6, 1992. The satellite's total cost was 19 million U.S. dollars, excluding the costs of experiments.

It was funded with Swedish tax money through the Swedish National Space Board, donations from the Wallenberg Foundation and approximately 25% from the German Ministry for Science and Technology.

== Experiments (payload) ==
- (F1) Electric Fields, Royal Institute of Technology, Sweden
- (F2) Magnetic Fields, Applied Physics Laboratory/Johns Hopkins University, United States
- (F3C) Cold Plasma, National Research Council of Canada, Canada
- (F3H) Particles; Hot Plasma, Swedish Institute of Space Physics, Kiruna, Sweden
- (F4) Waves, Swedish Institute of Space Physics, Uppsala, Sweden
- (F5) Auroral Imager, University of Calgary, Canada
- (F6) Electron Beam, Max Planck Institute for Extraterrestrial Physics, Germany
- (F7) Particle Correlator, Max Planck Institute for Extraterrestrial Physics, Germany

== See also ==
- Viking (satellite)
