= Cubesat Space Protocol =

Small network-layer delivery protocol for cubesats

- Communication protocol
- Abbreviation: CSP
- Purpose: CubeSat
- Developer(s): Johan de Claville Christiansen
- Introduction: April 26, 2010; 15 years ago
- OSI layer: 1, 2, 3, 4

CubeSat Space Protocol
- Original author: Johan de Claville Christiansen
- Developers: SpaceInventor, GomSpace, Space Cubics
- Initial release: April 26, 2010; 15 years ago
- Stable release: 2.1 / October 11, 2025; 14 days ago
- Repository: github.com/libcsp/libcsp
- Written in: C, Python
- Operating system: FreeRTOS, Linux, Zephyr, Mac OS X, Windows
- Type: Protocol
- License: MIT License
- Website: www.libcsp.org

CubeSat Space Protocol (CSP) is a small network-layer delivery protocol designed for CubeSats. The idea was developed by a group of students from Aalborg University in 2008, and further developed for the AAUSAT3 CubeSat mission that was launched in 2013. The protocol is based on a 32-bit header containing both network and transport layer information. Its implementation is designed for embedded systems such as the 8-bit AVR microprocessor and the 32-bit ARM and AVR from Atmel. The implementation is written in C and is ported to run on FreeRTOS, Zephyr and POSIX and pthreads-based operating systems such as Linux. The three-letter acronym CSP was adopted as an abbreviation for CAN Space Protocol because the first MAC-layer driver was written for CAN-bus. The physical layer has since been extended to include several other technologies, and the name was therefore extended to the more general CubeSat Space Protocol without changing the abbreviation.

The protocol and the implementation is still actively maintained by Johan de Claville Christiansen, Space Inventor, GomSpace, and Space Cubics. The source code is available under an MIT License and hosted on GitHub.

== Description ==
The CubeSat Space Protocol enables distributed embedded systems to deploy a service-oriented network topology. The layering of CSP corresponds to the same layers as the TCP/IP model. The implementation supports a connection-oriented transport protocol (Layer 4), a router-core (Layer 3), and several network-interfaces (Layer 1–2). A service-oriented topology eases the design of satellite subsystems, since the communication bus itself is the interface to other subsystems. This means that each subsystem developer only needs to define a service-contract, and a set of port-numbers their system will be responding on. Furthermore, subsystem inter-dependencies are reduced, and redundancy is easily added by adding multiple similar nodes to the communication bus.

Key features include:

- Simple API similar to Berkeley sockets.
- Router core with static routes. Supports transparent forwarding of packets over e.g. spacelink.
- Support for both connectionless operation (similar to UDP), and connection oriented operation (based on RDP).
- Service handler that implements ICMP-like requests such as ping and buffer status.
- Support for loopback traffic. This can e.g. be used for inter-process communication between subsystem tasks.
- Optional support for broadcast traffic if supported by the physical interface.
- Optional support for promiscuous mode if supported by the physical interface.
- Optional support for encrypted packets with XTEA in CTR mode.
- Optional support for HMAC authenticated packets with truncated SHA-1 HMAC.

== Operating systems supported ==
CSP should compile on all platforms that have a recent version of the gcc compiler. CSP requires support for C99 features such as inline functions and designated initializers.

- FreeRTOS – Tested on AVR8, AVR32 and ARM7.
- Linux – Tested on x86, x86-64 and Blackfin.
- Mac OS X (Support removed in libcsp 2.0)
- Microsoft Windows (Support removed in libcsp 2.0)
- Zephyr (Since libcsp 2.0)

== Physical layer drivers ==
CSP supports several physical layer technologies. The source code contains an implementation of a fragmenting CAN interface and drivers for SocketCAN and the Atmel AT90CAN128, AT91SAM7A1 and AT91SAM7A3 processors. From version 1.1 onwards, CSP also includes interfaces for I2C and RS-232. Interfaces need only to implement a function to transmit a packet, and insert received packets into the protocol stack with the csp_new_packet function. CSP has been successfully tested on top of the following layers:

- CAN
- I2C
- RS-232 using the KISS protocol
- CCSDS 131.0-B-1-S/131.0-B-2 space link protocol
- UDP/IP
- SPI

== Protocol header ==
=== Version 1 ===
The port range is divided into three adjustable segments. Ports 0 to 7 are used for general services such as ping and buffer status, and are implemented by the CSP service handler. The ports from 8 to 47 are used for subsystem specific services. All remaining ports, from 48 to 63, are ephemeral ports used for outgoing connections. The bits from 28 to 31 are used for marking packets with HMAC, XTEA encryption, RDP header and CRC-32 checksum.

CSP Header 1.x
Bit offset	31	30	29	28	27	26	25	24	23	22	21	20	19	18	17	16	15	14	13	12	11	10	9	8	7	6	5	4	3	2	1	0
0	Priority		Source					Destination					Destination; Port						Source; Port						Reserved				H M A C	X T E A	R D P	C R C
32	Data (0 – 65,535 bytes)																															

=== Version 2 ===
CSP Header 2.x
Bit offset	47	46	45	44	43	42	41	40	39	38	37	36	35	34	33	32	31	30	29	28	27	26	25	24	23	22	21	20	19	18	17	16	15	14	13	12	11	10	9	8	7	6	5	4	3	2	1	0
0	Priority		Destination														Source														Destination; Port						Source; Port						Reserved		H M A C	X T E A	R D P	C R C
48	Data (0 – 65,535 bytes)																																															
