= UniBRITE-1 =

Austrian satellite part of the BRITE constellation

- Mission type: Astronomy
- Operator: University of Vienna
- COSPAR ID: 2013-009G
- SATCAT no.: 39092

Spacecraft properties
- Bus: GNB
- Manufacturer: University of Toronto
- Launch mass: 7 kilograms (15 lb)

Start of mission
- Launch date: 25 February 2013, 12:31 UTC
- Rocket: PSLV-CA C20
- Launch site: Satish Dhawan FLP
- Contractor: ISRO; UTIAS

Orbital parameters
- Reference system: Geocentric
- Regime: Low Earth
- Perigee altitude: 777 kilometres (483 mi)
- Apogee altitude: 790 kilometres (490 mi)
- Inclination: 98.62 degrees
- Period: 100.38 minutes
- Epoch: 8 November 2013, 11:58:53 UTC

UniBRITE-1 is, along with TUGSAT-1, one of the first two Austrian satellites to be launched. Along with TUGSAT, it operates as part of the BRIght Target Explorer constellation of satellites. The two spacecraft were launched aboard the same rocket, an Indian PSLV-CA, in February 2013. UniBRITE is an optical astronomy spacecraft operated by the University of Vienna as part of the BRIght Target Explorer programme.

== Features ==
UniBRITE-1 was manufactured by the Space Flight Laboratory (SFL) of the University of Toronto Institute for Aerospace Studies (UTIAS), based on the Generic Nanosatellite Bus, and had a mass at launch of 7 kilograms (15 lb) (plus another 7 kg for the XPOD separation system). The satellite will be used, along with five other spacecraft, to conduct photometric observations of stars with apparent magnitude of greater than 4.0 as seen from Earth. UniBRITE-1 was one of the first two BRITE satellites to be launched, along with the Austrian TUGSAT-1 spacecraft. Four more satellites, two Canadian and two Polish, were launched at later dates.

UniBRITE-1 will observe the stars in the red color range whereas TUGSAT-1 will do it in blue. Due to the multicolour option, geometrical and thermal effects in the analysis of the observed phenomena are separated. The much larger satellites, such as MOST and CoRoT, both do not have this colour option. It will be extremely helpful in the diagnosis of the internal structure of stars. UniBRITE-1 will photometrically measure low-level oscillations and temperature variations in stars brighter than visual magnitude (4.0), with unprecedented precision and temporal coverage not achievable through terrestrial based methods.

== Launch ==
The UniBRITE-1 satellite along with TUGSAT-1 and AAUSAT3 was launched through the University of Toronto's Nanosatellite Launch System programme, named NLS-8. The NLS-8 launch was subcontracted to the Indian Space Research Organisation which launched the satellites using PSLV-C20 rocket from the First Launch Pad at the Satish Dhawan Space Centre. The NLS spacecraft were secondary payloads on the rocket, whose primary mission was to deploy the Indo-French SARAL ocean research satellite. Canada's Sapphire and NEOSSat-1 spacecraft, and the United Kingdom's STRaND-1, were also carried by the same rocket under separate launch contracts. The launch took place at 12:31 UTC on 25 February 2013, and the rocket deployed all of its payloads successfully.

== See also ==
- TUGSAT-1
