= BRITE =

Constellation of six university-operated nanosatellites

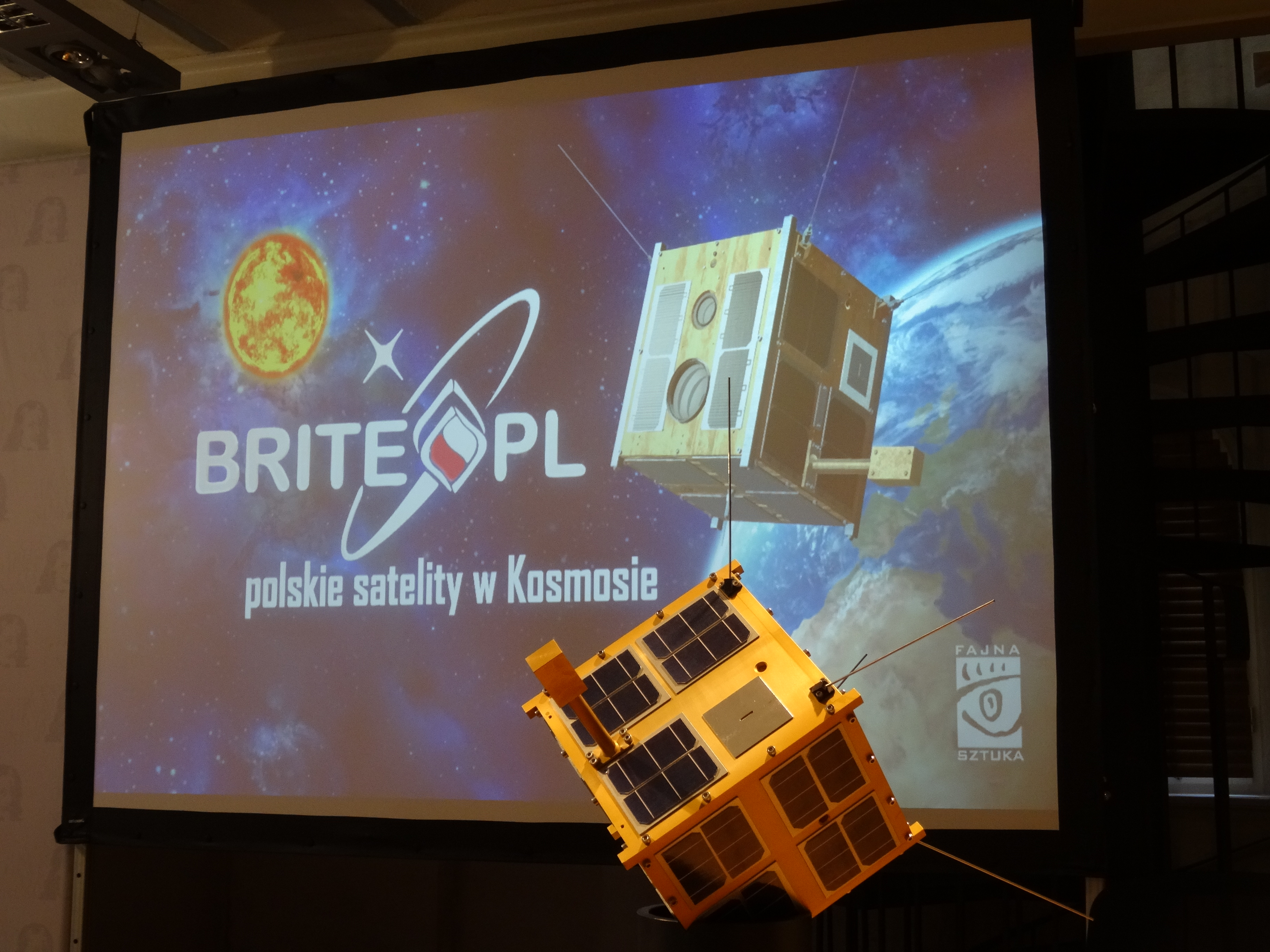
- A replica of Heweliusz (BRITE-PL)
- Country of origin: Canada; Austria; Poland
- Applications: Astronomy

Specifications
- Bus: Generic Nanosatellite Bus
- Launch mass: 10 kilograms (22 lb)
- Dimensions: 20 centimetres (7.9 in) cube
- Regime: Low Earth

Production
- Status: Operational
- Built: 6
- Launched: 6
- Operational: 3
- Retired: 2
- Lost: 1
- BRITE mission logo

BRITE-Constellation is an ongoing space mission carrying out two-band photometry in wide fields with a constellation of six (presently, three operational) BRIght Target Explorer (BRITE) nanosatellites. The mission was built by a consortium of three countries, Canada, Austria, and Poland, each operating two BRITE satellites. The six satellites were launched into low-Earth orbits between February 2013 and August 2014. Each satellite is a cube-shaped spacecraft with sides of 20 centimetres (7.9 in) hosting an optical telescope of 3 centimetres (1.2 in) aperture feeding an uncooled CCD with a field of view of approximately 20° × 24°. The satellites were intended for photometry of the brightest stars in single passband located in the blue (three satellites) or red (the other three satellites) part of the optical range.

== Early history ==
The idea of using microsatellite for scientific observations, especially for photometry of bright stars, was born during discussions on possible designs for Canada's first scientific satellite. Discussions led by Kieran Carroll and Slawek Rucinski (University of Toronto) led to three concepts, including a wide-field imager for photometric measurements. A design concept for an astronomical nano-satellite was developed in 2002 by the Institute for Aerospace Studies at the University of Toronto under the Canadian Advanced Nanospace eXperiment Program as Can X-3 in cooperation with a team of Canadian astronomers, headed by Slavek Rucinski, as a first fully three-axis stabilized satellite of 20 cm × 20 cm × 20 cm size. In September 2004, a workshop on nano-satellites for astronomy was organized in Vienna in cooperation with the Austrian Space Agency (ASA, now Aeronautics and Space Agency of the FFG). A proposal from the Institute of Communication Networks and Satellite Communications of the Graz University of Technology, led by Otto Koudelka, for funding of BRITE-Austria (TUGSat-1) was accepted by ASA in 2006 and was built at TUG in cooperation with SFL. In March 2005 a program for improving the infrastructure of Austrian Universities was established by the Austrian Ministry of Science and Technology, to which the University of Vienna submitted a proposal for UniBRITE (PI: Werner W. Weiss), which was accepted in October 2005 and UniBRITE was ordered at SFL. Following an initiative by Slavek Rucinski, Aleksander Schwarzenberg-Czerny (CAMK) was able to obtain funding for two Polish BRITE satellites at the end of 2009. Following that, the Canadian Space Agency (CSA) finally funded BRITE-Toronto and BRITE-Montréal (PI: Anthony Moffat, University of Montréal) in 2011. Hence, BRITE-Constellation was born as a collaboration between Austria, Canada and Poland.

== Launches and the status of the mission ==
The six BRITE nanosatellites were lifted into low-Earth orbits in four independent launches carried out by three space agencies: Indian Space Research Organisation (two Austrian satellites), Roscosmos (two Canadian satellites and Polish BRITE-Lem), and China National Space Administration (Polish BRITE-Heweliusz). Details of the launches are summarised in the table below.

Satellite name	Abbr	Launch date	Status	Launch vehicle	Launch site
UniBRITE	UBr	25 Feb 2013	Stopped observing	PSLV-CA	Satish Dhawan Space Centre First Launch Pad
BRITE-Austria	BAb	25 Feb 2013	Operational	PSLV-CA	Satish Dhawan Space Centre First Launch Pad
BRITE-Lem	BLb	21 Nov 2013	Stopped observing	Dnepr	Dombarovsky (air base) Site 13
BRITE-Toronto	BTr	19 June 2014	Operational	Dnepr	Dombarovsky (air base) Site 13
BRITE-Montréal	BMb	19 June 2014	Failed to deploy	Dnepr	Dombarovsky (air base) Site 13
BRITE-Heweliusz	BHr	19 Aug 2014	Operational	Long March 4B	Taiyuan Satellite Launch Center

Canadian BRITE-Montréal failed to detach from the launcher for unknown reasons and was lost. The other five satellites successfully passed the commissioning phase and began regular observations. The nominal lifetime of the BRITE satellites was foreseen to be two years. Due to problems with the attitude control system (ACS), observations with UniBRITE were suspended in August 2019, more than six years after its launch. About a year later, in May 2020, BRITE-Lem started to suffer from similar problems and observations with this satellite, also after more than six years in orbit, were suspended. Currently, the three remaining satellites, BRITE-Austria, BRITE-Toronto and BRITE-Heweliusz, are still active. Regardless of their status, observations with the BRITE satellites, and thus the entire mission, are expected to be completed by the end of 2024.

== Satellites ==
BRITE satellites are made up of the following subsystems:

- The Attitude Control System (ACS), which consists of reaction wheels, magnetorquers, magnetometer, Sun sensors and star trackers. The system ensures that the satellites are stabilized with an accuracy of approximately 1'.
- A telescope (refractor) with an aperture diameter of 3 cm. The refractor consists of 5 lenses with an effective focal length of 7 cm, providing a field of view of 24 degrees in diameter. To avoid saturation during exposures, the detectors are placed out of focus, making BRITE images intentionally defocused. An exception is BRITE-Heweliusz, whose optics consists of 4 lenses and its detector is placed on the opposite side of the focal plane than for the other satellites. This results in a slightly smaller field of view for this satellite.
- Each BRITE satellite is equipped with one interference filter, either blue (BAb, BMb and BLb) or red (UBr, BTr and BHr). The blue filter transmits light in the range of 395-456 nm, the red filter, in the range of 549-693 nm, as shown in the figure.
- The detectors on-board BRITE satellites are rectangular KAI-11002 4072 × 2720 pixels CCD chips. A small vignetting leads to an effective observed area of approximately 20° × 24°. The temperatures at which they operate on board the BRITE satellites range between 0 °C and 40 °C. The image scale in the detector plane amounts to 21 arcsec per pixel.
- On-board computers for data storage, maintenance and operating the ACS.
- Solar cells located on the sides of the satellite and a Li-ion battery to provide power for on-board systems when the satellite is in the Earth's shadow.
- Communication antenna for transmission between satellite and ground stations, operating in S-band.
