= Borówiec =

- Village
- Location within Poland
- Coordinates: 52°17′N 17°2′E
- Country: Poland
- Voivodeship: Greater Poland
- County: Poznań
- Gmina: Kórnik
- Population: 3,560

Borówiec [bɔˈruvjɛt͡s] (German: Waldau) is a village in the administrative district of Gmina Kórnik, within Poznań County, Greater Poland Voivodeship, in west-central Poland.

The Borowiec Astrogeodynamic Observatory is located in the village.
