= Odin (satellite) =

Swedish satellite with radiometer, 2001-2026

- Mission type: Aeronomy, Astrophysics
- Operator: OHB Sweden, former part of SSC; Funded by SNSB, TEKES, CSA, CNES
- COSPAR ID: 2001-007A
- SATCAT no.: 26702
- Website: www.snsb.se/en/Home/Space-Activities-in-Sweden/Satellites/Odin/
- Mission duration: 25 years, 5 months and 14 days

Spacecraft properties
- Manufacturer: Swedish Space Corporation
- Dry mass: 250 kg (550 lb)
- Power: 340.0 watts

Start of mission
- Launch date: 20 February 2001, 08:48:27 UTC
- Rocket: Start-1
- Launch site: Svobodny 5
- Contractor: United Start

End of mission
- Last contact: 3 August 2026
- Decay date: 3 August 2026

Orbital parameters
- Reference system: Geocentric
- Regime: Low Earth
- Perigee altitude: 622 km (386 mi)
- Apogee altitude: 622 km (386 mi)
- Inclination: 97.83°
- Period: 97.60 minutes

Odin was a Swedish satellite working in two disciplines: astrophysics and aeronomy. It was named after Odin of Norse mythology. Within the field of astrophysics, Odin was used until the spring of 2007 aiding in the study of star formation. Odin was used for aeronomical observations, including exploration of the depletion of the ozone layer and effects of global warming. The satellite was functioning nominally until it deorbited on 3 August 2026.

== Overview ==
The main instrument on Odin was a radiometer using a 1.1 m telescope, designed to be used for both the astronomy and aeronomy missions. The radiometer worked at 486–580 GHz and at 119 GHz. The second instrument on board was the OSIRIS (Optical Spectrograph and InfraRed Imager System).

Odin was developed by the Space Systems Division of Swedish Space Corporation (now SSC Sweden) as part of an international project involving the space agencies of Sweden (SNSB), Finland (TEKES), Canada (CSA) and France (CNES). Odin was launched on a START-1 rocket on 20 February 2001 from Svobodny, Russia.

In April 2007, astronomers announced that Odin had made the first ever detection of molecular oxygen (O_{2}) in interstellar clouds. The operator announced in 2025 that the satellite was expected to burn up in the atmosphere in the second quarter of 2026 and was expected to be operational until then, outliving the expected two year lifetime by 23 years.

== Lists ==
International partners:

- Sweden
- Canada
- France
- Finland

Agencies or organizations involved in Odin:

- Swedish National Space Board
- Swedish Space Corporation
- Canadian Space Agency
- Natural Sciences and Engineering Research Council (of Canada)
- National Technology Agency of Finland
- CNES (France)

Objectives:

- Astronomy
- Aeronomy applications
- Atmospheric research
- Stratospheric ozone chemistry
- Mesospheric ozone science
- Summer mesospheric science
- Coupling of atmospheric regions

== Results ==
Examples:

- Odin observed water in comets.
- Odin detected of molecular oxygen (O_{2}) in interstellar clouds.
- Odin observed carbon monoxide in the strato-mesosphere.
- Odin studied nitrous oxides in the atmosphere.

== See also ==
- Swedish National Space Agency
- Submillimeter Wave Astronomy Satellite
- Herschel Space Observatory
