= Odin-OSIRIS =

OSIRIS (Optical Spectrograph and InfraRed Imager System) is an instrument that measures vertical profiles of spectrally dispersed, limb scattered sunlight from the upper troposphere into the lower mesosphere. OSIRIS is one of two instruments on the Odin satellite, launched February, 2001 (the other instrument being a sub-mm radiometer) into a Sun-synchronous, 6 pm/6 am local time orbit at 600 km. This restricts OSIRIS sunlit observations to the Northern hemisphere in May, June, July and August, and the Southern hemisphere in November, December, January and February. Global coverage from 82°S to 82°N occurs on the months adjoining the equinoxes. OSIRIS measurements began November, 2001 and continue to the present.

== Objectives ==
- Stratospheric ozone science: To elucidate the geographical extent of, and mechanisms responsible for, ozone depletion in the "ozone hole" region and to study dilution effects and possible heterogeneous chemistry even outside of the polar regions due to sulphate aerosols.
- Coupling of atmospheric regions: To study some of the mechanisms that provide coupling between the upper and lower atmosphere, e.g., downward transport of NO with its effects on ozone photochemistry and the vertical exchange of minor species such as odd oxygen, CO, and H_{2}O.

== Instrument ==
The OSIRIS spectrograph measures from 274 nm to 810 nm with a single line of sight that is scanned through a range of tangent altitudes. Each scan typically ranges from 7 km to 65 km and takes 80 seconds to acquire. The measurements are used to produce height profiles of O_{3}, NO_{2}, and stratospheric aerosols.

The Odin satellite was operated until June 2007 as a joint mission between astronomy and aeronomy disciplines. 50% of the total observation time was dedicated to each discipline where time was split into 1 day segments. Odin has operated as a purely aeronomy mission since June, 2007, and continues to the present, with almost complete coverage.

OSIRIS is a Canadian instrument, operated by the Canadian Space Agency. The mission PI is Dr. Doug Degenstein, University of Saskatchewan. Odin is operated by the Swedish Space Corporation, with funds from the European Space Agency as a Third Party Mission.

== OSIRIS Data ==
OSIRIS data is publicly available on the Odin-OSIRIS website, odin-osiris.usask.ca.

Level 0: Radiance Data

Level 1: Calibrated Radiance Data

Level 2: Number Density and Volume Mixing Ratio (VMR) profiles as a function of altitude for O_{3}, Stratospheric Aerosols and NO_{2}.

== See also ==
- OSIRIS (imaging system on Rosetta comet mission)
- OSIRIS-REx (asteroid sample return probe)
