= Faculty of Power and Aeronautical Engineering of Warsaw University of Technology =

Coordinates: 52.2207°N 21.0059°E

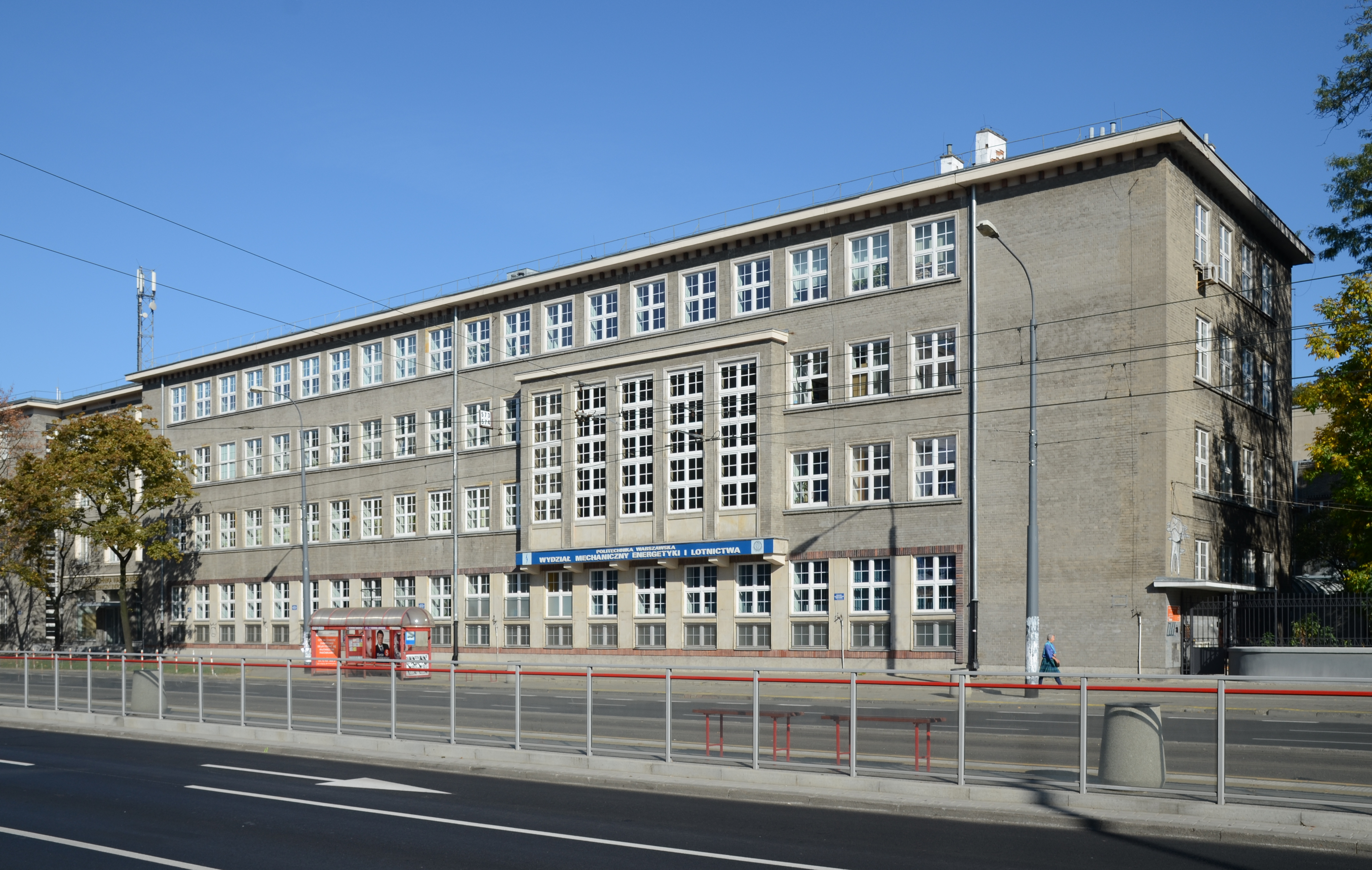
Building of the MEL Faculty

Faculty of Power and Aeronautical Engineering (pl.: Wydział Mechaniczny Energetyki i Lotnictwa, MEL, MEiL) is located on the Central Campus of the Warsaw University of Technology. The Faculty consists of three organisation units: The Institute of Heat Engineering, the Institute of Aeronautics and Applied Mechanics and the Dean's Office.

== History ==
The Faculty of Power and Aeronautical Engineering was created in 1960 by merging the Faculty of Aviation and the Faculty of Mechanics and Constructions. Władysław Fiszdon became the first dean of the new-created faculty. In 1970, the central government decided to extirpate the Polish aerospace industry. As a result of this decision, aviation courses were forbidden; further, the Faculty changed its name to the Wydział Mechaniczny Energetyki Cieplnej (Faculty of Mechanics and Power). In May 1970, the decision was canceled; subsequently, the Faculty reverted to its old name.

Previous Deans:

- Janusz Frączek 2016–present
- Jerzy Banaszek 2008-2016
- Krzysztof Kędzior 2002-2008
- Tadeusz Rychter 1996-2002
- Andrzej Styczek 1990-1996
- Piotr Wolański 1987-1990
- Jacek Stupnicki 1984-1987
- Jerzy Maryniak 1978-1984
- Wiesław Łucjanek 1975-1978
- Marek Dietrich 1973-1975
- Roman Gutowski 1969-1973
- Piotr Orłowski 1967-1969
- Jan Oderfeld 1965-1967
- Zbigniew Brzoska 1963-1965
- Władysław Fiszdon 1960-1963

== Courses ==
- Aerospace Engineering
- Automatics and Robotics
- Mechanical Engineering
- Power Engineering
- Nuclear engineering

== Authorities ==
- Dean: Janusz Frączek, Ph.D., D.Sc.
- Vice-Dean for General Affairs: Artur Rusowicz, Ph.D., D.Sc.
- Vice-Dean for Teaching Affairs: Maciej Jaworski, Ph.D., D.Sc.
- Vice-Dean for Student Affairs: Marta Poćwierz, Ph.D., D.Sc.
