= Swedish National Space Agency =

Swedish Government organisation

- Formation: 1972
- Legal status: government organisation
- Purpose: Manage Swedish state-financed space activities
- Location: Solna, Sweden
- Region served: Sweden
- Director-General: Ella Carlsson
- Budget: 1.3 billion SEK (2023)
- Staff: 30 staff
- Website: www.rymdstyrelsen.se

The Swedish National Space Agency (SNSA, Swedish: Rymdstyrelsen) is a government agency in Sweden operating under the Swedish Ministry of Education and Science. SNSA operates as a key component of the Swedish space programme, which is mostly carried out through international cooperation, and has included a sequence of satellite missions, both national ones and in cooperation with other nations. Furthermore, the agency distributes government grants to research and development, initiates research and development in space and remote sensing, and acts as the Swedish contact in international cooperative efforts.

By the 2010s, it had a yearly budget of approximately 900 Mkr (100 M€), about 70% of which being used to support various programmes performed by the European Space Agency (ESA) that had been deemed to be of importance to Sweden. As of 2018, SNSA comprised a total of 30 permanent employees, the majority operating from its office in the Solna Municipality of Stockholm, Sweden. Rymdstyrelsen changed its English name from the Swedish National Space Board to the Swedish National Space Agency in 2018.

== History ==
=== Background ===
The nation of Sweden's space activities predate the establishment of SNSA by several decades; a key early milestone was the founding of the Kiruna Geophysical Observatory (KGO) during July 1957, which had been preceded by over a decade of appeals and negotiations by members of the Swedish scientific community. Even prior to the KGO's establishment, it had been recognised that Sweden was geographically well-positioned for numerous space-related activities, including the observation of atmospheric phenomenon such at the aurora borealis, due to its relatively mild climate in relation to its proximity to the Arctic Circle. The KGO attracted numerous international scientists, and acted as a gateway to further collaborative efforts, including space-based activities.

In 1959, the Swedish Space Research Committee (SSRC) was founded to pursue three primary objectives: the development of a national space programme, to ensure Swedish engagement with international projects, and to handle a prospective launch site for sounding rockets. Almost immediately upon its creation, the committee begun negotiations to participate in the newly created European Space Research Organisation (ESRO), in line with its second objective. However, this ambition was somewhat complicated due to the committee's lack of executive authority, and the Swedish government's wider policy ambitions of stringent non-alignment, although the concept of some level of European cooperation was politically palatable. Accordingly, while Sweden did sign the ESRO Convention during June 1962, membership of the European Launcher Development Organisation (ELDO) was spurned; these decisions were as much motivated by political and industrial factors as they were by scientific ones.

During August 1961, the launching of sounding rockets commenced at the Vidsel Test Range. The endeavor has taken advantage of an offer from the United States to launch European research satellites at no cost, although the project did ultimately require financing by both the Swedish Space Research Committee and the Swedish National Defence Research Institute (FOA). Numerous such launches proceeded from Vidsel over the following years and decades. The ESRO also established Esrange as one of its scientific sites and launched its first rocket during November 1966; this move was met with expressions of concern by the Soviet Union of the location's potential militarisation. This pressure contributed to Sweden's push for complete transparency of its space-based operations.

=== Formation ===
By the mid-1960s, Sweden's space activities were being conducted by a series of different institutions and entities, leading to increasing confusion and calls for its reorganisation. Such reorganisation did occur, but not with any urgency. During the early 1970s, Sweden restarted its national sounding-rocket programme, benefiting from a considerable drop in price over the previous decade and funding for the endeavour from the FOA. There was also considerations of Sweden's potential take over of operations at Estrange from the ESRO, although sufficient funding for such ambitions was lacking.

The committee recognised that there was a clear need for a centralised agency for Sweden's space activities, although there was some dispute as to its programme's contents. While the pursuit of independence was viewed positively, there was also a great deal of support for the ELDO's activities. As a consequence of the ESRO's reorganisation into the European Space Agency (ESA), it was decided that a central Swedish authority, the Swedish National Space Board, would be created with full authority for the policy and planning of space-based activities, which were divided into two categories: space research and space applications. This was enacted, along with the takeover of the Estrange location, during July 1972.

While the Swedish National Space Board acted as the administrative authority, operations were conducted by the Swedish Space Corporation, a state-owned entity that was responsible at a system level and subcontracted out activities to industry. In its early years of operation, the efforts of the board were on three distinct areas: research, application, and remote sensing. In practice, the research and application focuses largely mirrored on another. After only a few years, the board's activities were subsequently regrouped along national boundaries. It largely focused upon negotiating with international organisations, primarily the ESA, over prospective Swedish participation in various projects, and the application of funding to suitable endeavours.

=== Activities ===
A key milestone of Sweden's space activities was its first satellite, named Viking. Work on Viking commenced in January 1978 and benefitted greatly from substantial increases to Sweden's space budget during the early 1980s. While initially intended as a collaborative effort with the Soviet Union, plans to use a Soviet launcher was abandoned in favour of the ESA's Ariane 1 in September 1979. The satellite platform, which was constructed by Boeing, was delivered to Saab during December 1982 for further manufacturing. On 22 February 1986, Viking was successfully launched from the ESA's Guiana Space Centre, it spent numerous years exploring plasma processes in the Earth's magnetosphere and the ionosphere prior to being decommissioned.

Another particularly high-profile event was the launch of the first Swedish astronaut, Christer Fuglesang, into space during December 2006. This feat was accomplished through cooperation with multiple international entities, Fuglesang having been selected by the ESA in 1992 for a flight assignment and undergone training in Russia and the United States prior to his flight on the Space Shuttle. Fuglesang's activities on the International Space Station was met with heavy coverage by Sweden's media, and led to a spike in attention to other Swedish space activities.

In February 2013, a government audit was released by the Swedish National Audit Office; amongst its conclusions, it observed that "Swedish space investment is distributed among multiple organizations that operate as stovepipes with no real communication between them and no common ambition." While approximately 1 billion Swedish krona (US$158 million) was being spent each year on Swedish space initiatives by this time, the audit report calls for additional oversight by the Swedish government of the European Space Agency (ESA), along with a review of the Swedish Space Corporation's operations and purpose.

== Satellite missions ==
- Viking (1986−1987), to explore plasma processes in the magnetosphere and the ionosphere
- Freja (1992−1996), a second space physics mission
- Astrid 1 (1995), microsatellite for space physics
- Astrid 2 (1998–1999), microsatellite for space physics
- Odin (2001−present), Swedish-Canadian-Finnish-French satellite for astronomy and atmospheric chemistry
- Prisma (2010−present), technology test of constellation flight
- Mats (2019), investigating atmospheric waves

== Director-Generals ==
Years	Name
1972−1979	Hans Håkansson
1979−1989	Jan Stiernstedt
1989−1998	Kerstin Fredga
1998−2009	Per Tegnér
2009−2018	Olle Norberg
2018–2024	Anna Rathsman
2024–present	Ella Carlsson

== See also ==
- List of government space agencies
- Swedish Space Corporation
- Esrange
- Swedish Institute of Space Physics
- European Space Agency
- Government agencies in Sweden
