= Space Research Centre of Polish Academy of Sciences =

Coordinates: 52.2145°N 21.0676°E

Space Research Centre
- Centrum Badań Kosmicznych (Polish)

Agency overview
- Abbreviation: SRC
- Formed: 29 September 1976
- Type: Space agency
- Headquarters: Warsaw, Poland
- Administrator: Piotr Orleański
- Employees: 180 (2010)
- Website: www.cbk.waw.pl

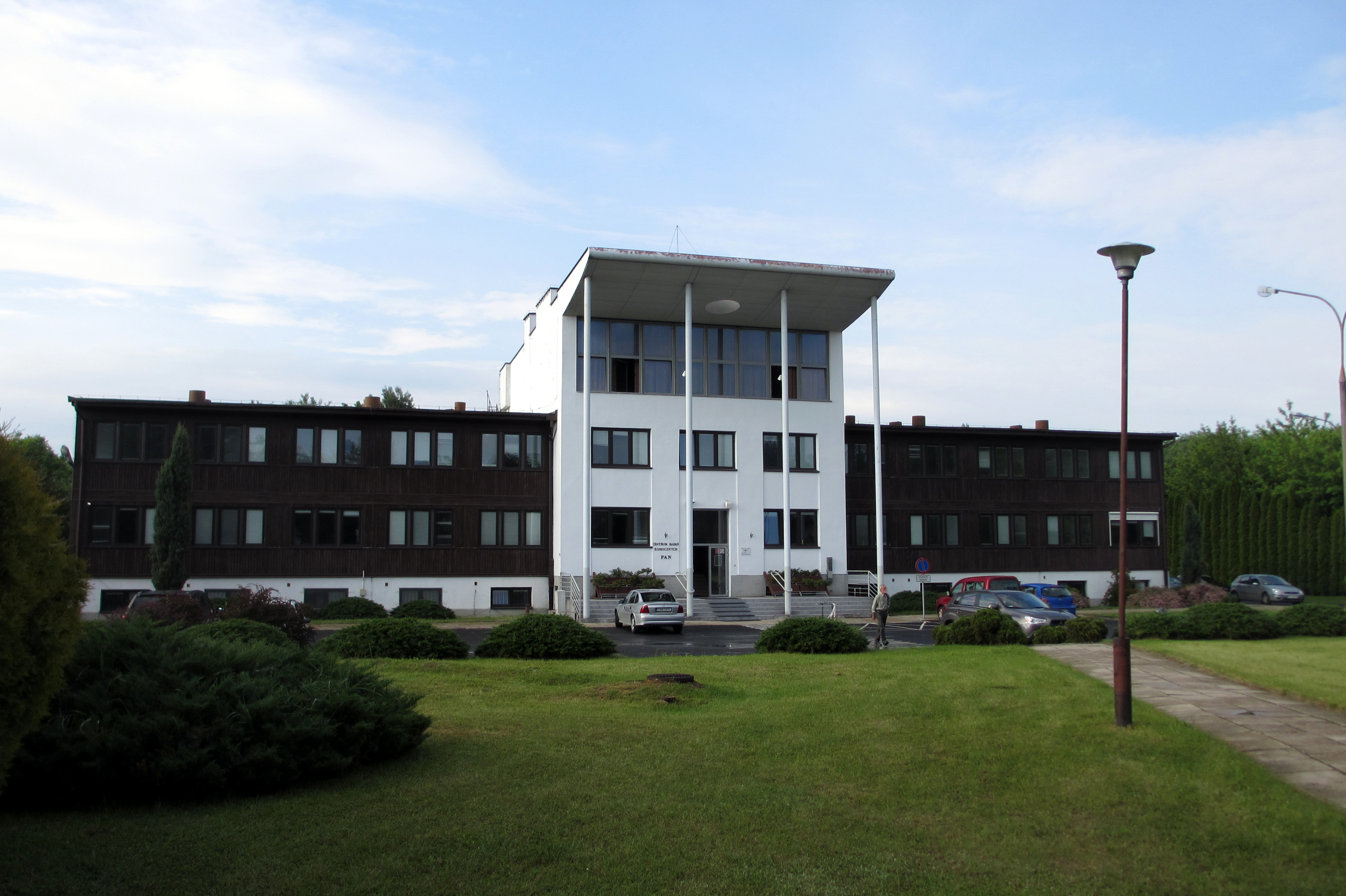
The main building in Warsaw (2014)

The Space Research Centre (SRC, Polish: Centrum Badań Kosmicznych) is an interdisciplinary research institute of the Polish Academy of Sciences. It was established in 1976 and began operations in 1977. SRC PAS is the only institute in Poland whose activity is fully dedicated to the research of terrestrial space, the Solar System and the Earth using space technology and satellite techniques.

The SRC also acted as Poland's national space agency until the Polish Space Agency (POLSA) was fully established in 2014.

Since 1977 the SRC staff developed, constructed and prepared for launch over 60 instruments and participated in the experiments in more than 50 space missions, for example: European Space Agency's Cassini–Huygens mission (investigation of Saturn and Titan), INTEGRAL (space laboratory of high energy astrophysics), Mars Express (Mars orbiter), Rosetta (mission to comet), Venus Express (Venus orbiter), Herschel Space Observatory (investigation of the coldest and most distant objects in the Universe), BepiColombo (mission to Mercury), Roscosmos's Koronas-F, Koronas-I, Koronas-Foton and Fobos-Grunt missions, and CNES' DEMETER and TARANIS missions. Space Research Centre has co-operated with the ESA since 1991. SRC has also collaborated with NASA (IBEX mission) and ISRO (Chandrayaan programme).

== Organisation structure ==
The Space Research Centre is composed of multiple R&D facilities spread across locations in Warsaw, Wrocław, as well as Borówiec near Poznań.

=== Research groups ===
- Solar System Dynamics and Planetology Division
  - Mars Exploration Laboratory
- Plasma Physics Division
  - Heliogeophysical Prediction Service Laboratory
- Solar Physics Division Wrocław
- Solar System Physics and Astrophysics Division
- Planetary Geodesy Division
  - Astrogeodynamic Observatory Borówiec
- Earth Observation Division
  - Crisis Information Center

=== Engineering groups ===
- Photonics and Micromechanics Laboratory
- Electronic Constructions Laboratory
- Space Mechatronics and Robotics Laboratory
  - Space Robot Dynamics Laboratory Zielona Góra
- Laboratory of Satellite Applications of FPGA

== See also ==
- Polish Astronomical Society
- List of government space agencies
