= Near Earth Object Surveillance Satellite =

Microsatellite from Canada

- Mission type: Asteroid detection
- Operator: CSA, DRDC
- COSPAR ID: 2013-009D
- SATCAT no.: 39089
- Website: www.asc-csa.gc.ca/eng/satellites/neossat/
- Mission duration: Primary mission: 1 year Elapsed: 13 years, 7 months and 16 days

Spacecraft properties
- Bus: Multi-Mission Microsatellite Bus
- Manufacturer: David Florida Laboratory, Spectro, Microsat Systems
- Launch mass: 74 kg (163 lb)
- Dimensions: 137 × 78 × 38 cm (54 × 31 × 15 in)
- Power: 45 watts

Start of mission
- Launch date: February 25, 2013, 12:31 UTC
- Rocket: PSLV-CA C20
- Launch site: Satish Dhawan FLP
- Contractor: ISRO/Antrix

Orbital parameters
- Reference system: Geocentric
- Regime: Sun-synchronous
- Semi-major axis: 7,155.78 km (4,446.40 mi)
- Perigee altitude: 776 km (482 mi)
- Apogee altitude: 792 km (492 mi)
- Inclination: 98.61 degrees
- Period: 100.41 minutes
- Mean motion: 14.34
- Epoch: 24, 20, 10:52:44 UTC

The Near Earth Object Surveillance Satellite (NEOSSat) is a Canadian microsatellite using a 15-cm aperture f/5.88 Maksutov telescope (similar to that on the MOST spacecraft), with 3-axis stabilisation giving a pointing stability of ~2 arcseconds in a ~100 second exposure. It is funded by the Canadian Space Agency (CSA) and Defence Research and Development Canada (DRDC), and searches for interior-to-Earth-orbit (IEO) asteroids, at between 45 and 55 degree solar elongation and +40 to -40 degrees ecliptic latitude.

== Spacecraft ==
NEOSSat is a suitcase-sized microsatellite measuring 137 × 78 × 38 centimetres (54 × 31 × 15 in), including telescope baffle, and weighing 74 kilograms (163 lb). It is powered by gallium arsenide (GaAs) solar cells placed on all six sides of its frame; the entire spacecraft uses around 80 watts of power, with the bus core systems consuming an average of 45 watts. The spacecraft uses miniature reaction wheels for stabilization and attitude control, and magnetic torque rods to dump excess momentum by pushing against Earth's magnetic field, so no on-board fuel is required for operation.

NEOSSat is a descendant of Canada's earlier MOST satellite. It was built on the Multi-Mission Microsatellite Bus, which was created using data from the development of MOST. Its science payload includes a telescope of the same design as that on MOST, and uses spare CCD detectors from the MOST mission.

The sole instrument is a 15-centimetre (5.9 in) Rumak-Maksutov telescope with a 0.86 degree field of view and a f/5.88 focal ratio. Incoming light is split and focused on two passively cooled 1024×1024 pixel CCDs, one used by the NESS and HEOSS projects and the other by the spacecraft's star tracker. Since the telescope is aimed relatively close to the Sun, it contains a baffle to shield its detectors from intense sunlight. The science camera takes 100-second-long exposures, allowing it to detect celestial objects down to magnitude 20. NEOSSat's attitude control allows it to maintain pointing stability of less than one arcsecond during the entire 100 second exposure period. It takes up to 288 images per day, downloading multiple images to its Canadian ground station with each pass.

== Launch ==
NEOSSat was originally scheduled for launch in 2007, but delays set it back until 2013. Alongside another Canadian spacecraft, Sapphire (a military surveillance satellite), and five other satellites, NEOSSat launched on February 25, 2013, from the Satish Dhawan Space Centre in Sriharikota, India, at 12:31 UTC aboard an Indian PSLV-C20 rocket.

== Missions ==
The NEOSSat satellite carries out three missions.

The spacecraft is a demonstrator of the utility of the Multi-Mission Microsatellite Bus (MMMB) as part of the CSA's efforts to develop an affordable multi-mission bus.

Near Earth Space Surveillance (NESS), led by Principal Investigator Alan Hildebrand of the University of Calgary, uses NEOSSat to search for and track near-Earth asteroids inside Earth's orbit around the Sun, including asteroids in the Aten and Atira classes. These asteroids are particularly difficult to detect from the surface of the Earth, as they are usually positioned in the daylit or twilit sky, when background light from the Sun makes such faint objects invisible. This form of stray light is not an issue for a telescope in orbit, making even a small-aperture telescope such as that on NEOSSat capable of detecting faint asteroids. The NESS science team expects to be able to detect many such asteroids as faint as visual magnitude 19. The NESS mission is funded by the CSA.

High Earth Orbit Space Surveillance (HEOSS), led by Principal Investigator Brad Wallace of DRDC, uses NEOSSat to conduct experimental satellite tracking activities. It focuses principally on satellites in the 15,000 to 40,000 km (9,300 to 24,900 mi) range, such as geostationary communications satellites, which are difficult to track via ground-based radar. These experiments include submitting tracking data to the Space Surveillance Network, as part of Canada's role in NORAD. The HEOSS activities support planning for follow-on missions to the Canadian Department of National Defence's operational satellite-tracking satellite, Sapphire, which was launched with NEOSSat. The HEOSS mission is funded by DRDC.

== Development ==
NEOSSat, originally conceived under the name NESS ("Near Earth Space Surveillance"), was proposed by Dynacon in 2000 to DRDC and CSA as a follow-on to the MOST microsatellite mission which was then halfway through its development. As conceived during an initial Phase A study for DRDC, it would have re-used almost all of the equipment designs from MOST, the main addition being a large external baffle to reduce the stray light impinging on the instrument's focal plane, necessary in order to achieve its asteroid detection sensitivity target of magnitude 19.

DRDC's Technology Demonstration Program (TDP) approved CDN$6.5M of funding for NEOSSat in 2003. By mid-2004 CSA had approved the remaining funding needed to initiate the NEOSSat procurement, and with DRDC formed a Joint Program Office to manage the mission development. At this point the spacecraft's name was changed from NESS to NEOSSat. A final Phase A study was carried out under CSA supervision in 2005, and a Phase B/C/D procurement was carried out in 2006/07, with a total development price cap of CDN$9.8M (not including launch cost). Dynacon was selected as prime contractor in 2007, at which point the total development cost was reported as CDN$11.5M, with a target launch date of late 2009. Shortly after that, Dynacon sold its Space division to Microsat Systems Canada Inc. (MSCI), which completed development of NEOSSat.

As development proceeded, while the basic design concept was kept, much of the equipment in the satellite was replaced by new designs in order to meet requirements imposed by the CSA's Multi-Mission Microsatellite Bus program. The basic instrument design was kept, as was the basic structure design, and the attitude control subsystem sensors and actuators; the on-board computers and radios were replaced, the instrument readout electronics was redesigned, and the external instrument "door" was replaced by an internal shutter.

By 2012, the CSA's contribution to program funding had risen by CDN$3.4M to CDN$8.8M, implying a total program contracted-out cost to end of satellite commissioning of CDN$15.4M. However, according to a Canadian Space Agency audit, the total program cost by the end of 2013 was CDN$25M, including both CSA and DRDC costs, with CSA's portion of the cost reported at just under CDN$13M.

=== Audit of the NEOSSat program ===
In February 2014, the CSA released a report detailing the results of an audit of the NEOSSat program, commissioned by CSA and conducted by external companies. This audit, carried out as "a requirement of the CSA five-year evaluation plan", covers only the period beginning with the signing of the CSA's NEOSSat contracts in 2005 through the end of 2013. Reports highlighted several negative findings of the audit, including delays in the program, and problems experienced by the satellite on-orbit that have kept it from achieving operational status. This includes the Electrical Power Subsystem interfering with the imager CCD, and delays in the development of flight software needed for operating the camera and maintaining spacecraft pointing stability. These problems were mainly attributed to poor performance by the contractor, MSCI, as well as to a perception that the project had been "under-funded by as much as 50 per cent" from the outset. However, MSCI has disputed criticism against the company, saying that program requirements were poorly written and that CSA staff interfered with the satellite's construction.

== See also ==
- 2013 in spaceflight
- Science and technology in Canada
- List of near-Earth object observation projects
