= AAUSat-3 =

CubeSat built and operated by Aalborg University, Denmark

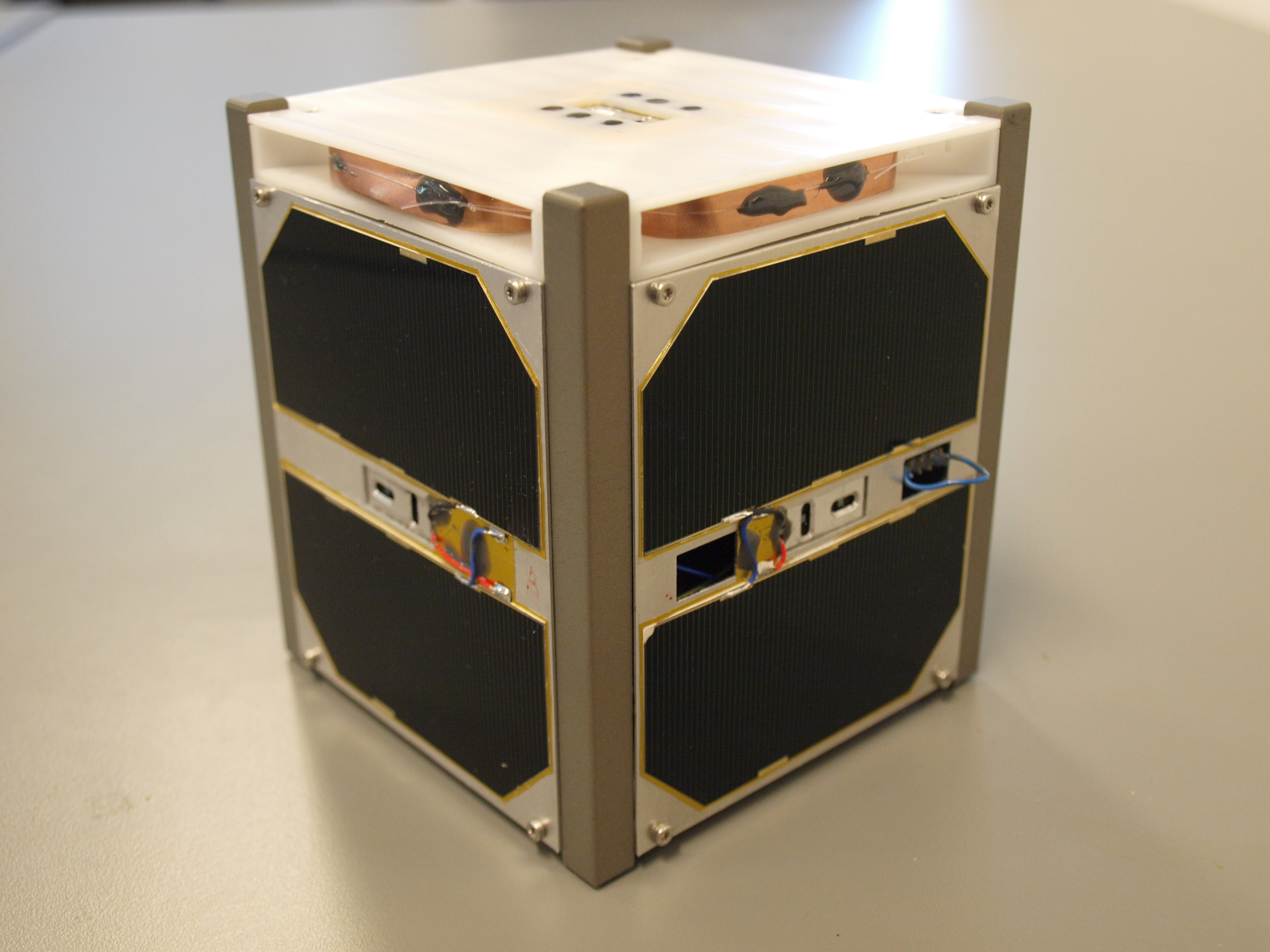
- AAUSat-3 flight model
- Names: AAUSAT3; Aalborg University CubeSat-3
- Mission type: Technology demonstration
- Operator: AAU Student Space
- COSPAR ID: 2013-009B
- SATCAT no.: 39087
- Website: space.aau.dk/aausat3
- Mission duration: 1 month (planned); 18 months (achieved)

Spacecraft properties
- Spacecraft: Aalborg University CubeSat-3
- Spacecraft type: 1U CubeSat
- Bus: CubeSat
- Manufacturer: AAU Student Space
- Launch mass: 0.8 kg (1.8 lb)
- Dimensions: 10 × 10 × 11.3 cm (3.9 × 3.9 × 4.4 in)

Start of mission
- Launch date: 25 February 2013, 12:31 UTC
- Rocket: Polar Satellite Launch Vehicle (PSLV-CA) (PSLV-C20)
- Launch site: Satish Dhawan Space Centre, First Launch Pad (FLP)
- Contractor: Indian Space Research Organisation
- Entered service: March 2013

End of mission
- Deactivated: 1 October 2014
- Last contact: 17 September 2014

Orbital parameters
- Reference system: Geocentric orbit
- Regime: Low Earth orbit
- Perigee altitude: 775 km (482 mi)
- Apogee altitude: 793 km (493 mi)
- Inclination: 98.62°
- Period: 100.60 minutes

Instruments
- Automatic Identification System (AIS)

AAUSat-3 (Aalborg University CubeSat-3), is the third CubeSat built and operated by students from the Aalborg University in Denmark. It was launched on 25 February 2013 from the Satish Dhawan Space Centre in India on a Polar Satellite Launch Vehicle (PSLV) launch vehicle (PSLV-C20). AAUSat-3 carries two Automatic Identification System (AIS-1 and AIS-2) receivers as the main payload.

== Educational objective ==
The primary purpose of satellite construction at University of Aalborg is to give the students engineering experience beyond what is normally achieved within a master's degree program. The design, implementation, and manufacturing were carried out by students, with only two exceptions: the manufacturing of the mechanical structure (carried out by the department workshop in alu7075), and the raw non-mounted PCBs. The project is funded mainly by Aalborg University and by Danish Maritime Safety Administration (DaMSA ), along with other sponsors.

== Scientific objective ==
The purpose of the satellite project was to find out if it was possible to receive Automatic Identification System (AIS) signals from a 1U CubeSat.

The spacecraft was designed to operate on a non-centralized basis so it would be able to continue functioning even when certain subsystems failed. It carried two automated identification system (AIS) receivers - one based on SDR principle. The images recorded by the satellite were later transmitted to the ground station located at Aalborg University, from which they were made accessible for the general public.

== History ==
Student satellite activities at Aalborg University (AAU) started in 2003 as a result of AAU's involvement in the first pure Danish research satellite, Ørsted, which was successfully launched in 1999. AAUSat-3's predecessors were AAU CubeSat (launched in 2003), and AAUSat-2 (launched in 2008). Students from AAU also participated in SSETI Express (launched in 2005), a student satellite initiative by European Space Agency (ESA) Education. The construction of AAUSat-3 began in the fall of 2007.

The satellite prototype was tested on a stratospheric balloon flight in October 2009 as part the BEXUS (Balloon Experiments for University Students) program, which allows European students to test scientific experiments in high altitude conditions. The balloon test served as an excellent opportunity to test the AIS receivers with an extended field of view (FOV) and to acquire realistic samples for further development of the final payload receivers. The payload on BEXUS was called NAVIS (North Atlantic Vessel Identification System).

== Operations ==
AAUSat-3 was launched on 25 February 2013 on PSLV-C20. Operations were a success. 9,000 AIS messages were received on a daily basis and downloaded to the mission control center (MCC), located in Aalborg, Denmark. All subsystems were tested and running. The first 100 days of operation were very successful. No degradation of the satellite was observed, all subsystems were working, and the primary payload – an AIS receiver – was working correctly.

Two critical situations occurred during the first 100 days:

28 February 2013 at 06:08: The last message for some days was received. During the previous 24 hours, battery voltage was decreasing, and temperature readings indicated that AAUSat-3 was steady pointing the side without solar cells towards the Sun. During the last pass over Aalborg, it was observed that battery voltage was slowly decreasing. The situation was discussed and analyzed during the day, and it was decided to instruct AAUSat-3 on all upcoming passes to switch off beacon mode because it was using power. No further attempt was taken to make contact during the weekend in order to preserve and recharge the satellite's battery. All passes were supervised. There was total silence until 4 March at 17:52 where the ground station in Aalborg requestes and received a beacon. The beacon showed an uptime of 1 day 19 hours, that everything was working, and that more than 7,000 AIS messages had been received. Everything went back to normal. The requested beacon also showed a high number of reboots, possibly due to low battery voltage. Due to this event, AAUSat-3 was set to tumble slowly – 2 rotations for every 100-minute orbit – to avoid a repetition of the problem.

24 May 2013: The power system (EPS) on AAUSat-3 rejected multi-frame communication packages from the ground. During four passes (500 minutes), the students analyzed the situation and inspected the C source for the EPS server, and a solution was found. A new package was sent to AAUSat-3, and normal EPS operation was re-established. During the event, the rest of the satellite – due to the decentralized design – was working. During the first 100 days, close to 800,000 AIS packages were received and downloaded.

10–11 June 2013: Two new software images for the SDR AIS receiver (AIS-2) were uploaded. It took approximately 1.5 paths to upload a full AIS receiver image. The satellite showed improvement and was newly capable of sampling and decoding in real time. First metrics showed a capacity of around 6,000 AIS messages per hour on average.

25 February 2014: One year up in space. AAUSat-3 was fully functioning, and AIS measurements were done on a regular basis. A ground station was established at Thule (Qaanaaq), Greenland, for extended download capacity. Energy production was stable but low, so the mission was interleaved with hours or days for charging batteries. New uploaded algorithms showed reception of approximately 8,000 messages per hour and real-time performance, which meant that decoding took less time than sampling and was carried out in parallel. Due to the ground station at Thule, it was possible to carry out real-time supervision, measuring and downloading at the same time. So only a few seconds after detection, the information was available in Aalborg at the MCC.

17 September 2014: The last message was received from the satellite.

1 October 2014: The project at AAU declared the end of the AAUSat-3 mission due to battery problems (continuous decline in power production). The project is grateful for the experience gained throughout the mission.

== Satellite subsystem strategy ==
AAUSat-3 was based on a decentralized concept with no dedicated master. The idea behind this approach was to achieve a modular satellite that, in many cases, would be able to function even when certain subsystems failed. For that reason, the must-have subsystems (EPS and COM) were designed to be simple and robust, whereas subsystems like AIS-2 were by necessity more complex, with a concomitant higher failure rate.

The power system (EPS) acts as intelligent supervisor and watchdog. AAUSat-3 consists of several sub-systems:

EPS	Electronic Power Supply	at90can128	8 MHz	FreeRTOS	32kB add RAM	
COM	Communication Module	at90can128	16 MHz	FreeRTOS	32 kB added RAM	ADF702x radio
ADCS1	Attitude Determination and Control 1	at90can128	8 MHz	FreeRTOS	32 kB added RAM	detumbling
ADCS2	Attitude Determination and Control 2	arm 7	x0 MHz	FreeRTOS	xx kB added RAM	determination and control
AIS1	Automatic Identification System	at90can128	8 MHz	FreeRTOS	32 kB added RAM	ADF702x for AIS receive
AIS2	Automatic Identification System	BF537	XXX MHz	μClinux	ADF702x for AIS receive	Receive all channels simultaneously
LOG	Onboard logging system			FreeRTOS		
FP	FlightPlanner			FreeRTOS		

On the ground segment, there were:

- CDH: Command and Datahandling System
- GND: Ground Station
- MCC: Mission Control Center

All internal and satellite-to-ground communication was carried out using CSP protocol.

== Technical specifications ==
The technical specifications was:

Dimensions	100 × 100 × 113 mm CubeSat standard
Mass	800 grams
Expected lifetime	Minimum 1 month
Attitude determination system	Sun sensors, gyro sensors, magnetometers
Attitude control system	Magnetic coils
Power	Solar-cell panels located in satellite surface
Batteries	Li-ion 8.2V 2200 mAh
Power bus	3.3 and 5V regulated
Antenna COM - UHF tx/rx	dipole (Be-Cu)
Antenna AIS (VHF)	dipole (Be-Cu)

== See also ==
- List of CubeSats
