= Viking (satellite) =

Swedish earth observation satellite

- Mission type: Earth observation
- COSPAR ID: 1986-019B
- SATCAT no.: 16614
- Mission duration: 1 year, 2 months and 20 days

Start of mission
- Launch date: 22 February 1986
- Rocket: Ariane 1
- Launch site: Guiana Space Centre
- Entered service: 22 February 1986

Orbital parameters
- Reference system: Geocentric
- Regime: Polar
- Semi-major axis: 13,550 km (8,420 mi)
- Eccentricity: 0.0001538
- Perigee altitude: 801 km (498 mi)
- Apogee altitude: 13,538 km (8,412 mi)
- Inclination: 98.7863°
- Period: 261.56 minutes
- Epoch: 15 April 2019, 18:22:45

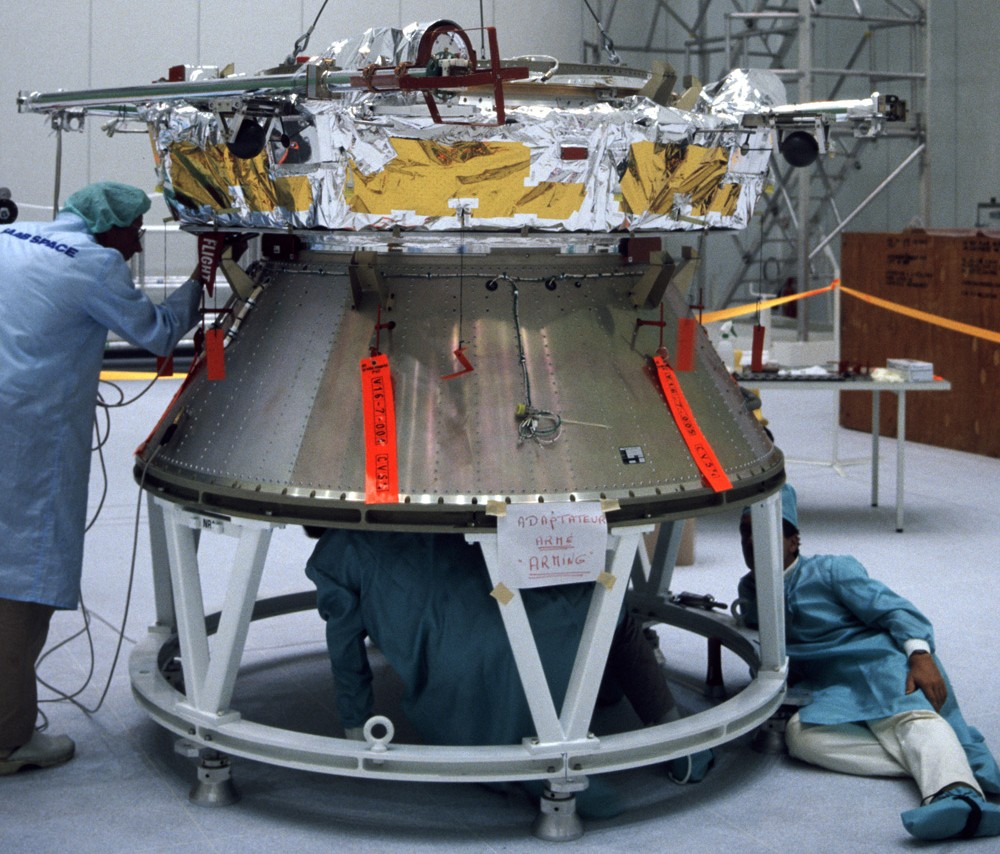
The Viking satellite is mounted on top of the Ariane adapter.

Viking was Sweden's first satellite. It was launched on an Ariane 1 rocket as a piggyback payload together with the French satellite SPOT 1, on 22 February 1986. Operations ended on 12 May 1987. Viking was used to explore plasma processes in the magnetosphere and the ionosphere.

== Spacecraft ==
Space was limited underneath the SPOT 1 satellite, and Viking had to be quite sturdy in order to withstand the stress of launch. The basic shape of the Swedish satellite was a flat octagonal disc, 0.5 metres thick and 1.9 metres across. The mechanical interface of the payload adapter from the Ariane rocket was duplicated on top of Viking. This enabled it to be added to the launch with a minimum of redesign of the SPOT satellite. The satellite was developed by SAAB Space with Boeing Aerospace as a major subcontractor.

The launch sequence was designed to enable Viking to separate and fire its own Star 26C apogee kick motor to be sent into its proper polar orbit after separation of the SPOT 1 satellite from the adapter interface.

== Mission ==
The satellite hosted five sensors and/or experiments: Electric Fields (V1); Magnetic Fields (V2); Hot Plasma Particles (V3); Waves (V4), and an Auroral Imager (V5).

Once in orbit, 4 wire segments of 40 metre length each were spooled out in a radial direction from the edge of the spinning satellite disc. Also, 2 stiff rods of 4 metre length were extended in the axial direction. A sensor pod was stationed at the end of each of these, forming three orthogonal pairs. Together they could measure the electric field of the Earth in all three dimensions. Stiff booms were also extended for other types of sensors and antennas. In addition, the satellite included two 4 meter long axial booms that hosted the V1 and V4 experiments. Two short radial booms hosted the V2 and V4 sensors.

The mission produced a large amount of extremely useful scientific data, and was deemed a great success. An initial discussion of what scientists learned from these measurements, which included "global distribution of magnetosphere-ionosphere interaction; auroral morphology and substorm dynamics; heating and expulsion of ionospheric plasma into the magnetosphere; field aligned acceleration into the ionosphere; and electron and ion wave generation" can be found in the article "Scientific results from the Swedish Viking satellite", 1988 Swedish Inst. of Space Physics, Kiruna.

== Post mission ==
After the scientific mission ended, both Viking and the upper stage of the rocket used to launch the satellite became derelict objects that would continue to orbit Earth for many years. As of January 2023 Both objects remain in orbit.
