= MAPHEUS =

German sounding rocket programme

Mapheus is a German sounding rocket programme run by the German Aerospace Center (DLR) since 2009. It is a research platform for experiments in weightlessness (microgravity) run by the DLR Institute of Frontier Materials on Earth and in Space, the DLR Institute of Aerospace Medicine, and the DLR Mobile Rocket Basis MORABA. Each sub-orbital flight provides about 6 minutes of weightlessness conditions for research and technology development. Launches are roughly annually from the Esrange Space Center run by SSC Space.

MAPHEUS is one of the European microgravity-research rocket programs, similar to the TEXUS or MASER/SubOrbital Express programs of the German and European space agencies (DLR and ESA). It currently focuses on research from materials physics and life sciences, and also serves as a technology test platform for the development and qualification of new sounding rocket vehicles and service systems. The DLR institutes develop and build the majority of the payload, often in collaboration with universities and other research centers.

== Missions ==
=== MAPHEUS 1–4 (2009–2013) ===
The first four launches of MAPHEUS were based on a two-stage Nike/Improved Orion vehicle, supporting payload with 14" diameter of around 190kg weight for flights up to around 150km height.

=== MAPHEUS 5–8 (2015–2019) ===
With MAPHEUS 5, there was a switch to the VSB-30 two-stage vehicle and larger 17" payload, supporting heavier payloads for flights up to around 250km height. For MAPHEUS 7, the S-31 engine booster of the VSB-30 was combined with an Improved Malemute as the second stage.

=== MAPHEUS 9–13 (2021–2023) ===
To establish an alternative to the VSB-30 vehicle, after MAPHEUS 8 a switch was performed to a two-stage Imroved Malemute (IM-IM) vehicle, using military surplus motors.

Due to restrictions posed by the COVID-19 pandemic and due to inavailability of the Skylark launcher on Esrange, the launches of MAPHEUS 9/10 were postponed to 2021/2022, and MAPHEUS 11 was launched in 2021 with a much reduced experiment team. All IM-IM launches for MAPHEUS used the MAN launcher on Esrange.

=== MAPHEUS 14– (2024–) ===
The launch of MAPHEUS 14 saw the first production use of RED KITE, a new sounding rocket motor produced by Bayern-Chemie and developed in cooperation with German Aerospace Center. MAPHEUS 15 demonstrated a flight to over 300km height, providing more than 7 minutes of time in weightlessness for more than 20 different experiments. It was also the 600th rocket launched from Esrange Space Center. MAPHEUS 16 was the first use of a two-stage RED KITE vehicle, allowing for a substantial increase in payload mass compared to earlier vehicles. This motor combination was later also used for the MASER-17 flight.

== List of MAPHEUS launches ==
name	launch date	vehicle	apogee	total payload mass
MAPHEUS 1	May 22, 2009	Nike/Improved Orion	141km	198kg
MAPHEUS 2	Oct 27, 2010	Nike/Improved Orion	153km	178kg
MAPHEUS 3	Nov 25, 2012	Nike/Improved Orion	145km	195kg
MAPHEUS 4	Jul 15, 2013	S-30	154km	267kg
MAPHEUS 5	Jun 30, 2015	VSB-30	253km	408kg
MAPHEUS 6	May 14, 2017	VSB-30	254km	403kg
MAPHEUS 7	Feb 17, 2018	S-31/Improved Malemute	248km	365kg
MAPHEUS 8	Jun 13, 2019	VSB-30	238km	379kg
MAPHEUS 11	May 24, 2021	IM/IM	221km	370kg
MAPHEUS 10	Dec 6, 2021	IM/IM	259km	310kg
MAPHEUS 9	Jan 29, 2022<	IM/IM	253km	328kg
MAPHEUS 12	Oct 21, 2022	IM/IM	258km	313kg
MAPHEUS 13	May 22, 2023	IM/IM	230km	361kg
MAPHEUS 14	Feb 27, 2024	RED KITE/IM	265km	426kg
MAPHEUS 15	Nov 11, 2024	RED KITE/IM	309km	361kg
MAPHEUS 16	Nov 12, 2025	RED KITE/RED KITE	267km	475kg

== Scientific experiments ==
Microgravity experiments carried out on MAPHEUS vary from materials science to biology. Examples include additive manufacturing developing a gravity-independent powder bed fusion process, experiments on granular matter, research on the solidification of metallic alloy melts, technology testing for solar cell materials, fundamental research on colloidal active matter, and on the properties of bio-membranes of vesicles as minimalistic biophysical models of cells and for pharmacodynamics.

== See also ==
- Microgravity research
- Esrange - Swedish Space Cooperation
- TEXUS
- REXUS/BEXUS
- Maser
- Maxus
