= Mobile Rocket Base =

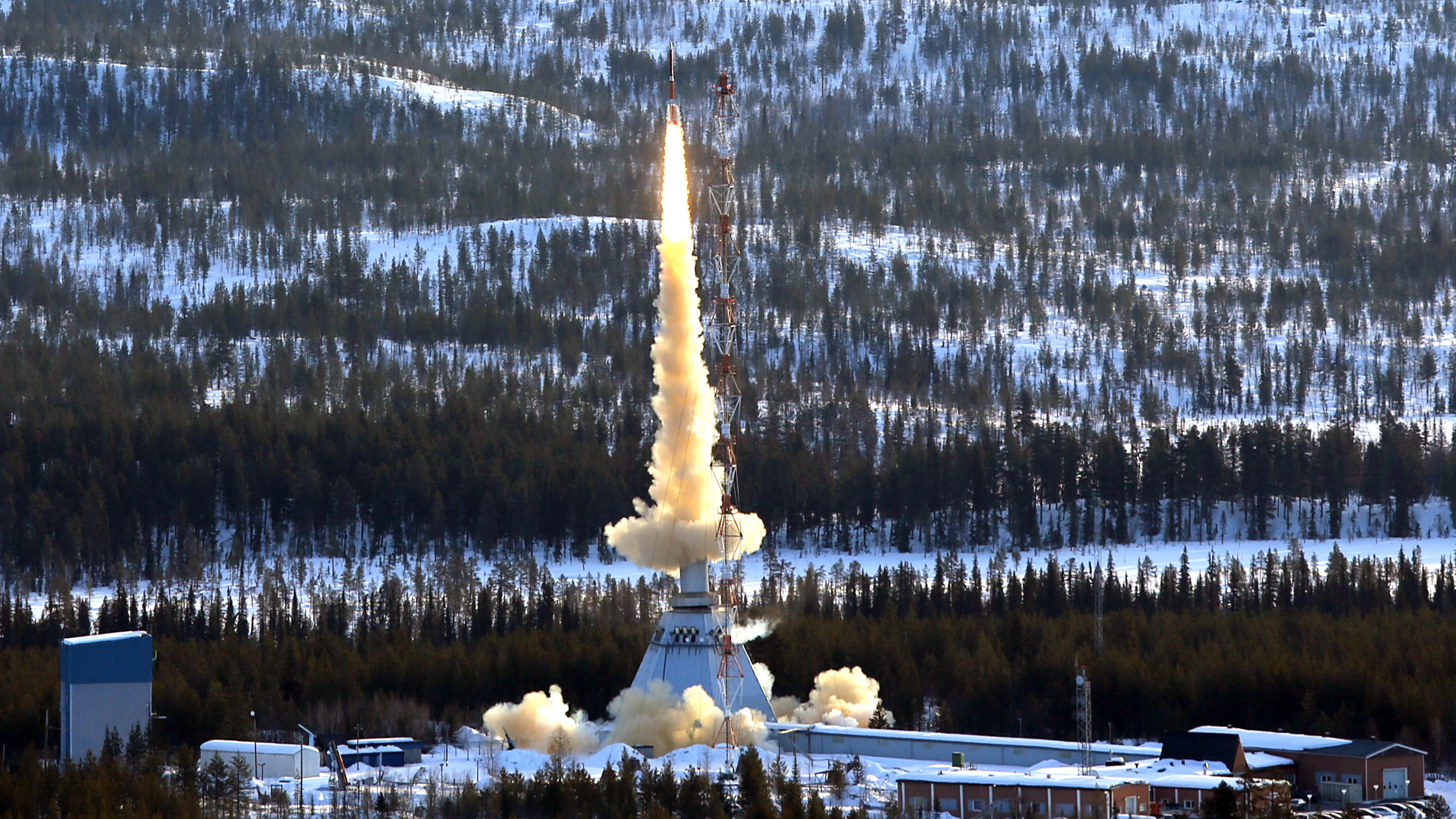
Launch of the TEXUS 50 sounding rocket from the rocket launch site Esrange, Kiruna

The Mobile Rocket Base (German: Mobile Raketenbasis), abbreviated MORABA, is a department of the DLR Space Operations and Astronaut Training in Oberpfaffenhofen near Munich. Since the 1960s, the MORABA has performed scientific high altitude research missions with unmanned rockets and balloons, and has developed the required mechanical and electrical systems. Their operational areas include upper atmosphere research, microgravity research, astronomy, geophysics, materials science, as well as hypersonic research.

EuroLaunch, a cooperation between MORABA and SSC Esrange, offers international launch services for stratospheric balloons and sounding rockets. Since 1971, MORABA also cooperates with the Brazilian Instituto de Aeronáutica e Espaço (IAE) of the Departamento de Ciência e Tecnologia Aeroespacial (DCTA).

== Divisions of MORABA ==
=== Mobile Infrastructure ===
The mobile ground stations and antennas for telemetry (reception of data) and tele-command (transmission of control commands), as well as range instrumentation radar stations for the exact trajectory measurement, are part of the Mobile Infrastructure. This includes also ground support systems for communication, power supplies, etc. The main tasks include tracking the trajectory of sounding rockets or research balloons, RF data reception, data processing, distribution and archiving. Transport, setup and maintenance of the mobile stations, as well as mission preparation, are also part of the activities.

=== Electrical Flight Systems ===
The Electrical Flight Systems group develops, builds, and qualifies the necessary electrical and electronic systems aboard the rockets and balloons. Among others, this includes onboard computer systems, control and measurement equipment, data management and telemetry components, and RF transmission systems. Attitude, rate, and acceleration sensors are calibrated and flown in these systems. Cold gas rate and attitude control systems are developed and qualified by this group. The construction of Electrical Ground Support Equipment (EGSE) is also in the scope of tasks.

=== Mechanical Flight Systems ===
The Mechanical Flight Systems group performs structural calculations, aerodynamic and thermal analyses. Also, mechanical configuration and design of the payload and the entire vehicle are planned and accomplished, as well as the integration of scientific experiments and the spin balancing of the final payload. Furthermore, this group develops and maintains separation and payload recovery systems.

=== Launch Services ===
The tasks of the Launch Services group include procurement, inspection, modification and storage of rocket motors and pyrotechnics, setup of the mobile launch pads, assembling the rocket stages and ignition systems, integrating the payload and rocket motors, and loading the rocket onto the launcher. Furthermore, the group is responsible for support of flight safety, trajectory calculations, aerodynamic calculations, and selection of the rocket configuration.

== Mechanical and electronic flight systems developed by MORABA ==
- Rocket fins and sub structures
- Separation systems of the rocket stages
- De-spin systems to eliminate rocket spin before the experiment phase
- Parachute recovery systems
- TV multichannel transmission systems
- On-board systems for rate, attitude, spin rate, and precession control
- Ignition units for safe ignition of rocket motors and payload pyrotechnics
- Mobile electrical and mechanical ground systems, such as ground stations and launch pads
- Telemetry and tele-command systems
- Integrated radio frequency systems for rockets and balloons

== History ==
The Mobile Rocket Base emerged from the "Working Group For Space Exploration", a common foundation of the Max Planck Institute for Extraterrestrial Physics (MPE) and the former German Laboratory for Aviation (DVL). This working group was founded in 1965 and had its first headquarters in Munich. Since April 1969 the Mobile Rocket Base is located in Oberpfaffenhofen, near Munich, in the department "Space Operations and Astronaut Training" of the German Aerospace Center (DLR).

The first mobile campaign to study the solar eclipse in May 1966 on the Greek island of Euboea, on behalf of the European Space Research Organisation (ESRO), demonstrated the feasibility to move and set up extensive technical and scientific equipment in a short time in a remote location.

=== The beginning: Atmospheric research ===
In cooperation with the MPE, a campaign for the study of the magnetic field of the Earth was carried out in the spring of 1967, at Esrange (Sweden). With five Nike-Apache rockets, artificial barium clouds (Aurora Borealis) were created in about 100 km altitude, in order to visualize the magnetic field lines.

In addition to the rocket launch sites in Scandinavia (Kiruna and Andenes), also Sardinia, Wallops Island and Matagorda Island (USA), White Sands (USA), Greenland, Trivandrum (India), Woomera (Australia), Huelva (Spain), Natal (Brazil), and Adelaide Island (Antarctica) were used for the launch of payloads with various scientific purposes. In the following years, sounding rockets were used mainly in the fields of upper atmosphere and research into the causes of global warming.

=== New fields of application: Microgravity research ===
With the start of the "HEATPIPE 1" payload, manufactured by Dornier, Friedrichshafen, a new field of application for sounding rockets emerged. The launch took place on January 22, 1976 at Esrange, with the aim to investigate the function of heat pipes and latent heat storage in a microgravity environment for their application in future satellite projects.

Initially intended as a supplementary programme for the German Spacelab missions, the first launch of a TEXUS payload took place on December 13, 1977 with a two-stage Skylark rocket at Esrange. In the following years, up to four TEXUS missions (6 minutes of microgravity) were flown per year, with numerous experiments. In order to meet the ever-increasing number of experiments with different requirements and objectives, the Swedish MASER programme, the MAXUS programme (13 minutes microgravity), and the MiniTEXUS programme (3 minutes microgravity) were initiated, under the aegis of the European Space Agency (ESA).

=== Further tasks: Launch of high altitude research balloons ===
Already in May 1975, the Mobile Rocket Base was involved in research balloons with the flight of the 2.5-ton "Spectro-Stratoscope" instrument in Palestine (Texas), for the reception of the PCM data from the payload. Together with the Max Planck Institute for Aeronomy in Lindau (Harz, Germany), international balloon flights were carried out in Aire-sur-l'Adour (France), Mendoza (Argentina), and Hyderabad (India), to explore the chemical composition (and pollution) of the atmosphere in different altitudes and latitudes.

=== Technology transfer: From rockets to satellites ===
In the early years of German sounding rocket research, the payloads were designed and built by engineers and technicians from the companies Dornier, MBB, Kayser-Threde, and ERNO. Parallel to the withdrawal of Dornier and MBB from payload construction for sounding rockets, MORABA developed and tested, in addition to the already existing spin rate and attitude control modules and parachute recovery systems, mechanical and electrical flight systems which were difficult or impossible to obtain on the market. The first and successful application of a rocket-qualified data acquisition and transmission / reception system on a satellite was in the re-entry experiment "EXPRESS". For this project, in late 1994 a complete transmitting and receiving station with all necessary functions was set up by MORABA in the South Australian desert and was operated over the turn of the year. After the launch with a Japanese satellite launcher and a 7-day orbital flight, the landing of the EXPRESS capsule was planned to occur in the vicinity of the town of Coober Pedy (Australia). However, due to a malfunction of the rocket, the capsule entered an elliptical orbit with very low Perigee and landed in Africa after only a few revolutions.

Further applications of developments of MORABA in space flight missions included experiments aboard the Russian space station Mir and the DLR satellite BIRD.

=== Latest trend: Hypersonic research - the flying wind tunnel ===
Similar to the novel use of the rocket platform for microgravity research, the use of sounding rockets as a flying hypersonic wind tunnel has increased steadily. With the help of sounding rockets, large flight models are brought to speeds of above Mach 12 and reentry periods of up to one minute can be achieved. For the DLR Sharp Edge Flight Experiment (SHEFEX) MORABA designed and built the payload subsystems and the rocket system. With its launch in October 2005 from Andenes (Norway) the project has been successfully completed. Further experiments of this kind were the also successfully completed follow-up project SHEFEX II (launched in June 2012), as well as the scramjet engine research programs HIFiRE and Scramspace.

== Missions conducted or supported by MORABA ==
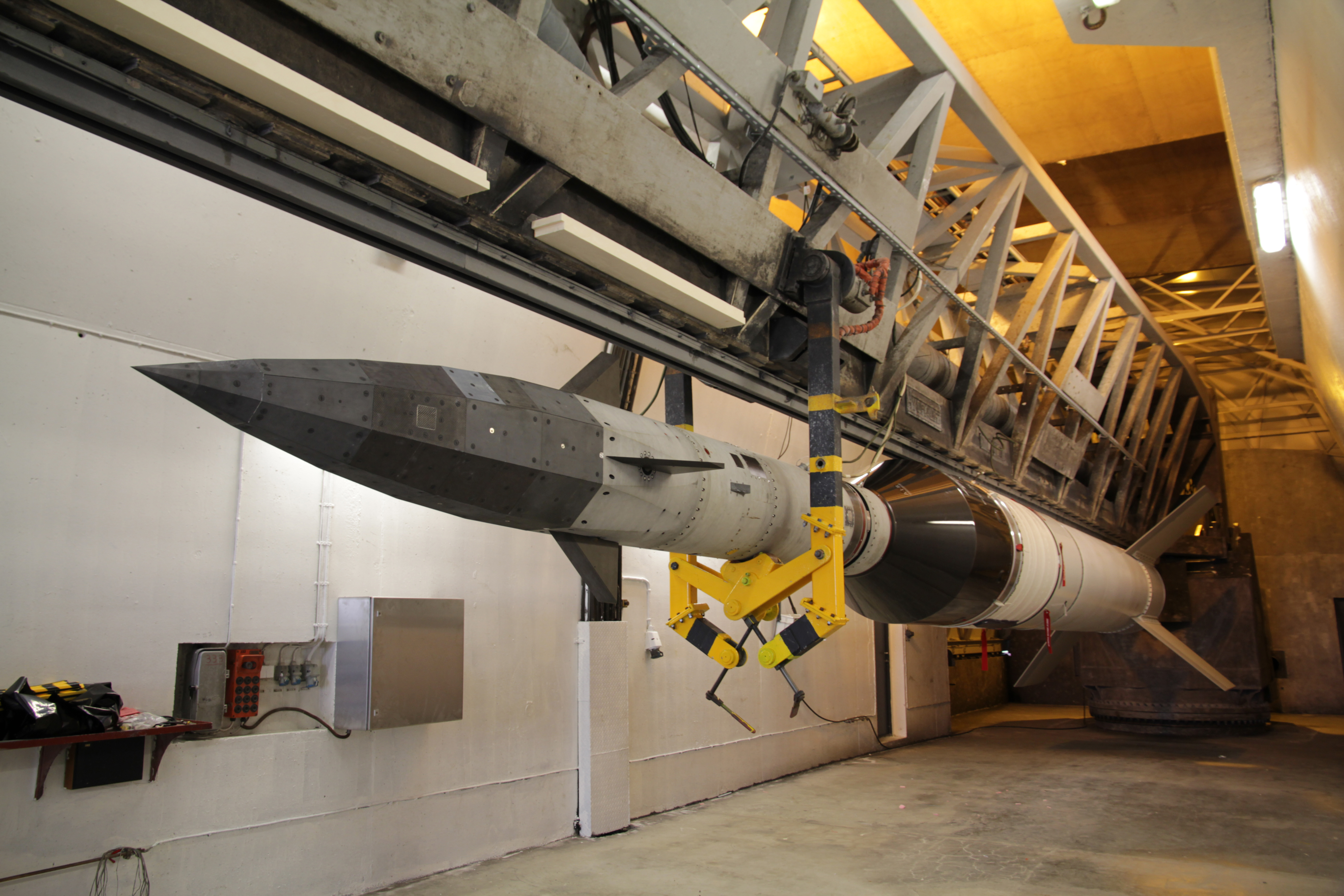
SHEFEX II sounding rocket on the Launcher at Andøya Rocket Range

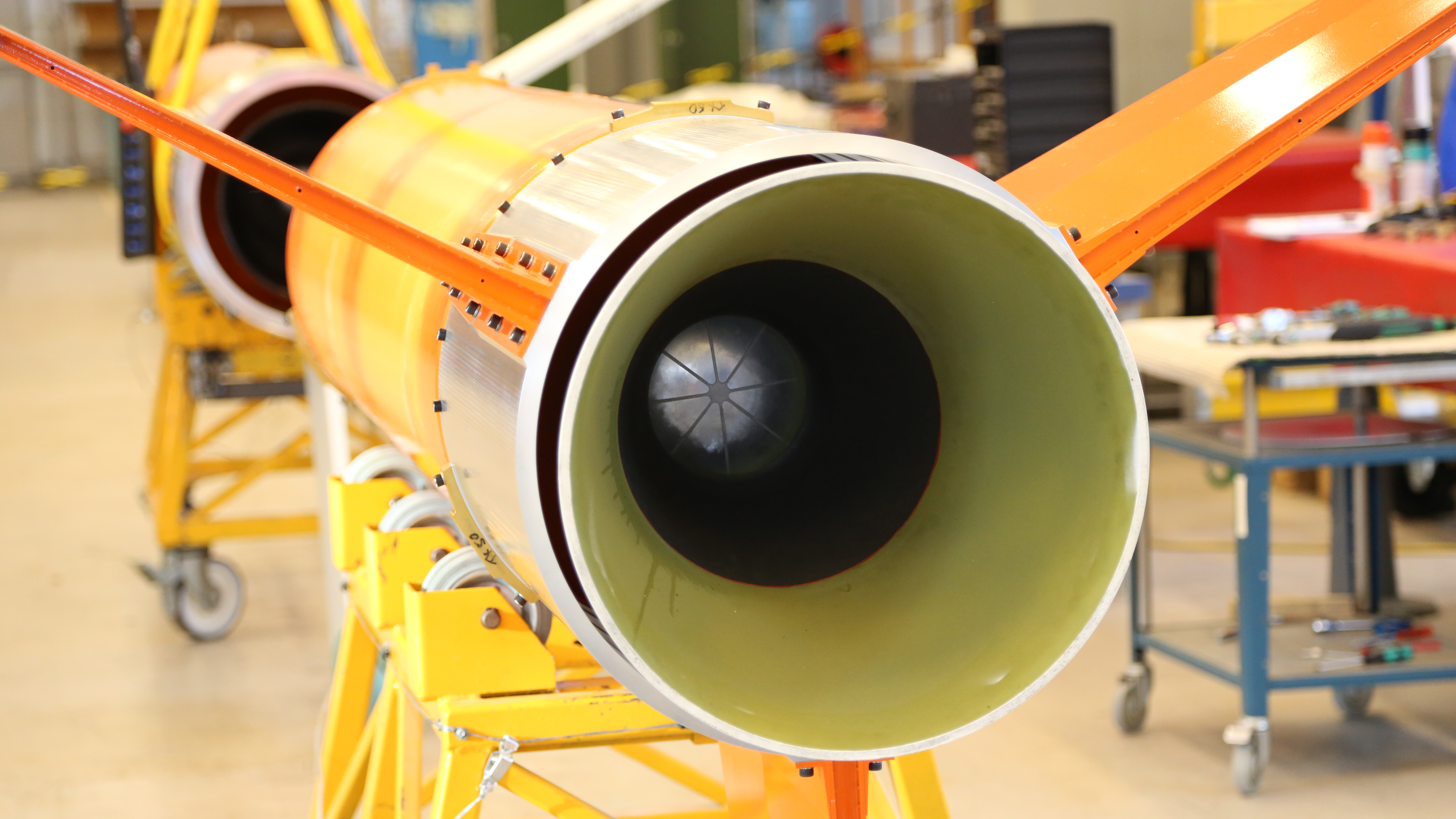
Preparation of a VSB-30 rocket motor for the launch of the TEXUS 50 sounding rocket

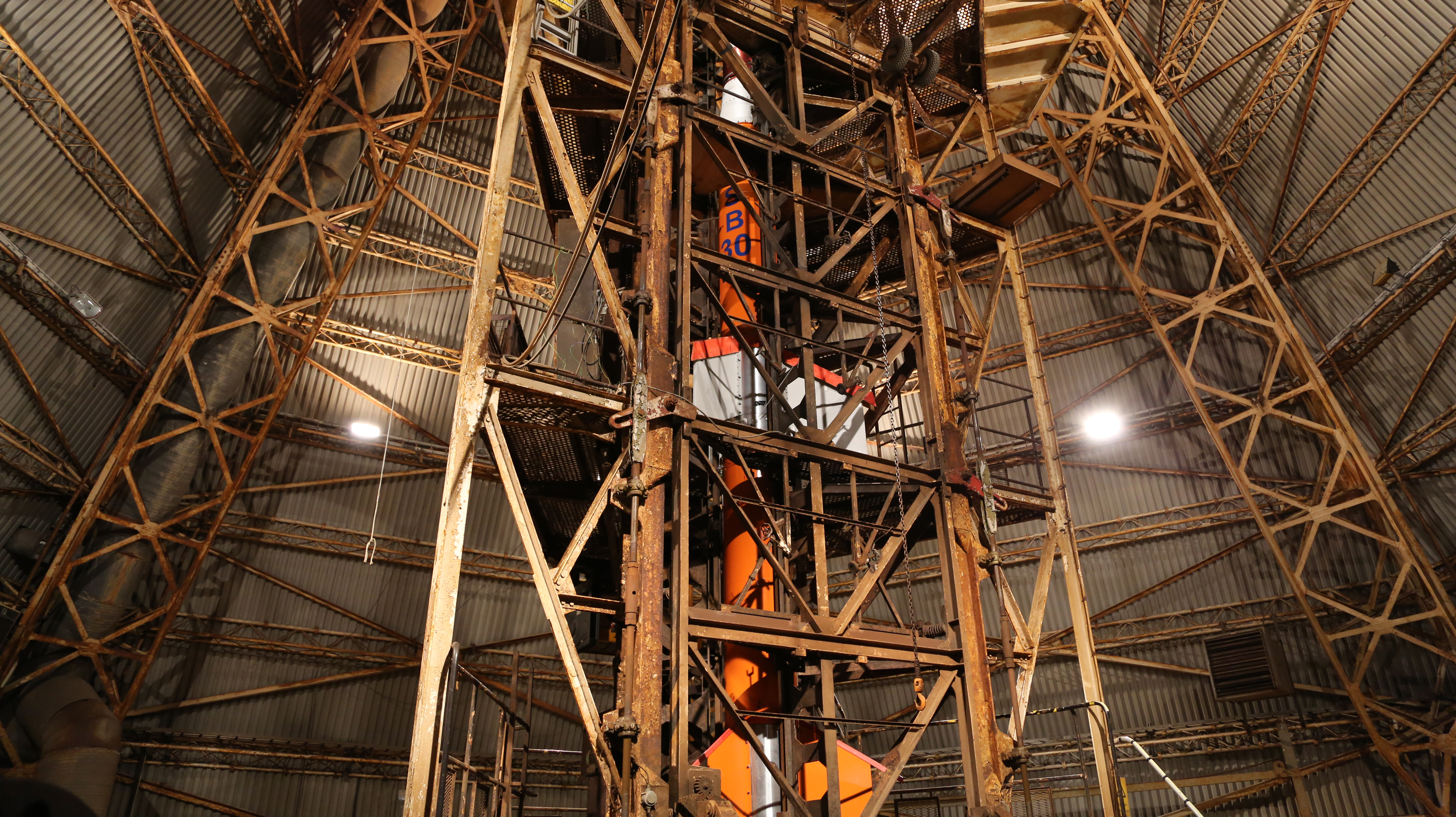
TEXUS 50 rocket in the Skylark launch tower at Esrange, Kiruna

=== Current projects of MORABA ===
- TEXUS (German: Technologische EXperimente Unter Schwerelosigkeit): Technology Experiments in Microgravity Environment
- REXUS/BEXUS: Sounding Rocket and Balloon Experiments for University Students
- STERN: Students' Experimental Rockets (German: STudentische Experimental-RaketeN): Support program for students to develop innovative rocket engines
- MAPHEUS: Material Physics Experiments in Microgravity (German: MAterialPHysikalische Experimente Unter Schwerelosigkeit)
- WADIS (German: WellenAusbreitung und DISsipation in der Mittleren Atmosphäre): Research project of the Leibniz-Institute of Atmospheric Physics in Kühlungsborn, Germany, and the Institute of Space Systems (IRS) of the University of Stuttgart, Germany
- SHEFEX (SHarp Edge Flight Experiment): Program of the German Aerospace Center (DLR)
- MASER: Sounding rocket program of the Swedish Space Corporation (SSC), for microgravity research
- MAXUS: Joint venture between Astrium and the Swedish Space Corporation (SSC) for materials science research in microgravity environment
- HIFiRE: Australian program for the development of a supersonic combustion ramjet (Scramjet)
- MAIUS: Study of a Bose–Einstein condensate in microgravity environment
- ROTEX (ROcket Technology EXperiment): Students' flight experiments of the Institute of Aerodynamics at the RWTH Aachen University
- Corsair (formerly CSSR: Comet Surface Sample Return): Cooperation with NASA. The goal is to take a sample from the surface of a comet nucleus and transport it to Earth.

=== Selected missions ===
Mission	Launch date	Launch site	Feature / annotation
Conestoga I	September 9, 1982	Matagorda Island, USA	Launch of the first privately funded rocket that reached space.
Supernova	August 24, 1987	Woomera	Project of the MPE to study the X-ray emission of Supernova 1987A.
SpaceMail	February 6, 2000	Alcantara (Brasil)	PR campaign of the Deutsche Post AG.
SHEFEX	October 27, 2005	Andøya (Norway)	Novel hypersonic reentry vehicle, developed by DLR.
REXUS 3	April 5, 2006	Esrange (Sweden)	Flight test REGINA of the inflate system for the ARCHIMEDES balloon probe, a project of the Mars Society Germany.
TEXUS 45	February 21, 2008	Esrange (Sweden)	Among other experiments, study of motion sicknesses with the aid of Tilapia fishes in microgravity
SHEFEX II	June 22, 2012	Andøya (Norway)	Further development of the SHEFEX vehicle. On this flight, before the ignition of the second stage, the VS-40 launch vehicle was realigned using a cold gas attitude control system.

=== List of rocket and balloon missions ===
Chronological list of rocket and balloon missions involving MORABA
Launch Date	Rocket Configuration	Project	Location	Country	Payload Mass (kg)	Payload Length (m)
25.10.2019	Balloon 12k m³	BEXUS 28	Kiruna	Sweden
23.10.2019	Balloon 12k m³	BEXUS 29	Kiruna	Sweden
19.03.2019	Improved Orion	REXUS 26	Kiruna	Sweden
11.03.2019	Improved Orion	REXUS 25	Kiruna	Sweden
04.03.2019	Improved Orion	REXUS 23	Kiruna	Sweden
18.10.2018	Balloon 12k m³	BEXUS 27	Kiruna	Sweden
17.10.2018	Balloon 12k m³	BEXUS 26	Kiruna	Sweden
12.03.2018	Improved Orion	REXUS 24	Kiruna	Sweden
20.10.2017	Balloon 12k m³	BEXUS 25	Kiruna	Sweden
18.10.2017	Balloon 12k m³	BEXUS 24	Kiruna	Sweden
16.03.2017	Improved Orion	REXUS 22	Kiruna	Sweden
15.03.2017	Improved Orion	REXUS 21	Kiruna	Sweden
07.10.2016	Balloon 12k m³	BEXUS 23	Kiruna	Sweden
05.10.2016	Balloon 12k m³	BEXUS 22	Kiruna	Sweden
18.03.2016	Improved Orion	REXUS 19	Kiruna	Sweden
15.03.2016	Improved Orion	REXUS 20	Kiruna	Sweden
10.10.2015	Balloon 12k m³	BEXUS 20	Kiruna	Sweden
07.10.2015	Balloon 12k m³	BEXUS 21	Kiruna	Sweden
18.03.2015	Improved Orion	REXUS 18	Kiruna	Sweden
17.03.2015	Improved Orion	REXUS 17	Kiruna	Sweden
10.10.2014	Balloon 12k m³	BEXUS 18	Kiruna	Sweden
08.10.2014	Balloon 12k m³	BEXUS 19	Kiruna	Sweden
29.05.2014	Improved Orion	REXUS 15	Kiruna	Sweden
28.05.2014	Improved Orion	REXUS 16	Kiruna	Sweden
10.10.2013	Balloon 12k m³	BEXUS 17	Kiruna	Sweden
08.10.2013	Balloon 12k m³	BEXUS 16	Kiruna	Sweden
15.07.2013	VS-30	MAPHEUS 4	Kiruna	Sweden
28.06.2013	VS-30	WADIS 1	Andøya	Norway		4,3
08.05.2013	Improved Orion	REXUS 13	Kiruna	Sweden
07.05.2013	Improved Orion	REXUS 14	Kiruna	Sweden
12.04.2013	VSB-30 V17	TEXUS 50	Kiruna	Sweden
09.12.2012	S30 - Improved Orion V10	IGUAIBA / INPE 14	Alcantara	Brasil
25.11.2012	Nike - Improved Orion	MAPHEUS 3	Kiruna	Norway
16.11.2012	Improved Orion	REXUS 11	Kiruna	Sweden
25.09.2012	Balloon 10k m³	BEXUS 15	Kiruna	Sweden
24.09.2012	Balloon 10k m³	BEXUS 14	Kiruna	Sweden
12.09.2012	S30 - Improved Orion	HIFiRE 3	Andøya	Norway
22.06.2012	VS-40	SHEFEX 2	Andøya	Norway
23.04.2012	S30 - Improved Orion	HIFiRE 5	Andøya	Norway
19.03.2012	Improved Orion	REXUS 12	Kiruna	Sweden
13.02.2012	VSB-30	MASER 12	Kiruna	Sweden
03.12.2011	S30 - Improved Orion	ICI 3	Ny-Ålesund (Spitsbergen)	Norway
27.11.2011	VSB-30	TEXUS 48	Kiruna	Sweden
28.09.2011	Balloon	BEXUS 13	Kiruna	Sweden
27.09.2011	Balloon	BEXUS 12	Kiruna	Sweden
21.07.2011	Nike - Improved Orion	PHOCUS	Kiruna	Sweden
11.05.2011	Improved Orion	Camurupim (RTV-04)	Natal	Brasil
29.03.2011	VSB-30 V15	TEXUS 49	Kiruna	Sweden
23.02.2011	Improved Orion	REXUS 10	Kiruna	Sweden
22.02.2011	Improved Orion	REXUS 9	Kiruna	Sweden
19.12.2010	Nike - Improved Orion	ECOMA 9	Andøya	Norway
13.12.2010	Nike - Improved Orion	ECOMA 8	Andøya	Norway
12.12.2010	VSB-30 V14	MICROG1A (Maracati 2)	Alcantara	Brasil
06.12.2010	Improved Orion	Maracati 2 (RTV-03)	Alcantara	Brasil
05.12.2010	Nike - Improved Orion	ECOMA 7	Andøya	Norway
23.11.2010	Balloon	BEXUS 11	Kiruna	Sweden
27.10.2010	Nike - Improved Orion	MAPHEUS 2	Kiruna	Sweden
09.10.2010	Balloon	BEXUS 10	Kiruna	Sweden
26.03.2010	Castor 4B	MAXUS 8	Kiruna	Sweden	808,0	6,0
04.03.2010	Improved Orion	REXUS 8	Kiruna	Sweden	105,2	3,1
02.03.2010	Improved Orion	REXUS 7	Kiruna	Sweden	121,7	3,1
24.01.2010	Balloon	MIPAS-B/TELIS	Kiruna	Sweden
29.05.2009	Improved Orion	Maracati 1 (RTV-02)	Alcantara	Brasil
22.05.2009	Nike - Improved Orion	MAPHEUS 1	Kiruna	Sweden	198,0
29.11.2009	VSB-30 V10	TEXUS 47	Kiruna	Sweden
22.11.2009	VSB-30 V09	TEXUS 46	Kiruna	Sweden	373,0
11.10.2009	Balloon 10k m³	BEXUS 9	Kiruna	Sweden
10.10.2009	Balloon 10k m³	BEXUS 8	Kiruna	Sweden
13.03.2009	Improved Orion	REXUS 5	Kiruna	Sweden	101,7	3,1
12.03.2009	Improved Orion	REXUS 6	Kiruna	Sweden	95,1	3,5
10.03.2009	Balloon	MIPAS/TELIS	Kiruna	Sweden
08.12.2008	S30 - Improved Orion V05	ICI-2	Ny-Ålesund (Spitsbergen)	Norway
27.10.2008	Improved Orion	Parelhas (RTV-01)	Natal	Brasil
22.10.2008	Nike - Improved Orion	REXUS 4	Kiruna	Sweden
08.10.2008	Balloon 12k m³	BEXUS 7	Kiruna	Sweden
08.10.2008	Balloon 10k m³	BEXUS 6	Kiruna	Sweden
12.07.2008	Nike - Improved Orion	ECOMA 6	Andøya	Norway
07.07.2008	Nike - Improved Orion	ECOMA 5	Andøya	Norway
30.06.2008	Nike - Improved Orion	ECOMA 4	Andøya	Norway
Jun 2008	Balloon	MIPAS/TELIS	Teresina	Brasil
15.05.2008	VSB-30 V08	MASER 11	Kiruna	Sweden	387,3	5,1
01.04.2008	Improved Orion	APRIL ONE (RTV-00)	Kiruna	Sweden	83,0	2,8
21.02.2008	VSB-30 V06	TEXUS 45	Kiruna	Sweden	357,0	4,9
07.02.2008	VSB-30 V05	TEXUS 44	Kiruna	Sweden	372,8	4,8
31.01.2008	S30 - Improved Orion	HotPay 2	Andøya	Norway	138,1	2,9
04.08.2007	Nike - Improved Orion	ECOMA 3	Andøya	Norway
19.07.2007	VSB-30 V04	Cuma 2	Alcantara	Brasil
28.03.2007	Balloon	BEXUS 5	Kiruna	Sweden
17.09.2006	Nike - Improved Orion	ECOMA 2	Andøya	Norway
09.09.2006	Nike - Improved Orion	ECOMA 1	Andøya	Norway
19.06.2006	Balloon	BEXUS 4	Kiruna	Sweden
11.05.2006	VSB-30 V03	TEXUS 43	Kiruna	Sweden	407,0
02.05.2006	Castor 4B	MAXUS 7	Kiruna	Sweden	784,7
05.04.2006	Improved Orion	REXUS 3	Kiruna	Sweden	100,0
01.12.2005	VSB-30 V02	TEXUS 42 (TEXUS-EML)	Kiruna	Sweden	372,2
27.10.2005	S30 - Improved Orion V03	SHEFEX 1	Andøya	Norway
19.06.2005 - 08.07.2005		MAXUS 7 Recovery Drop Test 2	Kiruna	Sweden
02.05.2005	Skylark 7	MASER 10	Kiruna	Sweden	370,0
11.04.2005 - 19.04.2005	Castor 4B	MAXUS 7 Recovery Drop Test 1	Kiruna	Sweden
22.03.2005	Balloon 10k m³	BEXUS 3	Kiruna	Sweden
18.01.2005 - 21.01.2005	Super Loki 4 Chaff	ROMA 2005	Andøya	Norway
	Viper IIIA 2 Mini Midas	ROMA 2005	Andøya	Norway
	Viper IIIA 13 Falling Spheres	ROMA 2005	Andøya	Norway
02.12.2004	Skylark 7	TEXUS 41	Kiruna	Sweden	401,6	5,2
22.11.2004	Castor 4B	MAXUS 6	Kiruna	Sweden	793,0
28.10.2004	Improved Orion	REXUS 2	Kiruna	Sweden	100,0
23.10.2004	VSB-30 V01	Cajuana	Alcantara	Brasil
2004		PHOENIX Flight	Vidsel	Sweden
2004	Nike - Orion	Louise 1	CEL	France
26.02.2004	Balloon 10k m³	BEXUS 2	Kiruna	Sweden
28.11.2003	Nike - Improved Orion	ICI-1	Ny-Ålesund (Spitsbergen)	Norway
2003		PHOENIX FTS Drop Test	Kiruna	Sweden
17.06.2003 - 04.07.2003	Improved Orion	ROMA/MIDAS	Ny-Ålesund (Spitsbergen)	Norway
	Improved Orion	ROMA/MIDAS	Ny-Ålesund (Spitsbergen)	Norway
	Improved Orion	ROMA/MIDAS	Ny-Ålesund (Spitsbergen)	Norway
08.04.2003	Skylark 7	TEXUS 40	Kiruna	Sweden	364,0
01.04.2003	Castor 4B	MAXUS 5	Kiruna	Sweden	795,0
28.01.2003	Terrier - Orion	SAGE/MaCWAVE	Kiruna	Sweden
24.01.2003	Terrier - Orion	SAGE/MaCWAVE	Kiruna	Sweden
10.01.2003 - 30.01.2003	Viper 46 Falling Spheres	SAGE/MaCWAVE	Kiruna	Sweden
01.12.2002	VS-30 V06	Cuma 1	Alcantara	Brasil
23.11.2002	S30 - Improved Orion V02	Pirapema	Alcantara	Brasil
21.08.2002 - 10.10.2002	Viper IIIA 1 Chaff	ROMA 2002	Andøya	Norway
	Viper IIIA 22 Falling Spheres	ROMA 2002	Andøya	Norway
05.07.2002	Improved Orion	MIDAS 8	Andøya	Norway
05.07.2002	Improved Orion	MIDAS 7	Andøya	Norway
05.07.2002	Terrier - Orion	MaCWAVE	Andøya	Norway
02.07.2002	Improved Orion	MIDAS 6	Andøya	Norway
01.07.2002	Terrier - Orion	MaCWAVE	Andøya	Norway
28.06.2002 - 05.07.2002	Viper IIIA 14 Falling Spheres	MIDAS / MaCWAVE	Andøya	Norway
	Super Loki 12 Falling Spheres	MIDAS / MaCWAVE	Andøya	Norway
16.03.2002	Skylark 7	MASER 9	Kiruna	Sweden	347,0
16.12.2001	Improved Orion	Hygrosonde 2	Kiruna	Sweden
16.07.2001 - 14.09.2001	Viper IIIA 5 Chaff	ROMA 2001	Longyearbyen	Norway
	Viper IIIA 25 Falling Spheres	ROMA 2001	Longyearbyen	Norway
24.06.2001	Improved Orion	MIDAS 5 Cone	Andøya	Norway
17.06.2001	Improved Orion	MIDAS 4 Cone	Andøya	Norway
08.06.2001 - 24.06.2001	Viper IIIA 5 Chaff	MIDAS / SOLSTICE	Andøya	Norway
	Viper IIIA 7 Falling Spheres	MIDAS / SOLSTICE	Andøya	Norway
08.05.2001	Skylark 7	TEXUS 39	Kiruna	Sweden	364,1
06.05.2001	NSM	NSM 2	Andøya	Norway
29.04.2001	Castor 4B	MAXUS 4	Kiruna	Sweden	803,4
19.02.2001	Improved Orion	MAXUS Test Flight	Kiruna	Sweden
24.10.2000	NSM	NSM 1	Andøya	Norway
21.08.2000	S30 - Improved Orion V01	Baronesa	Alcantara	Brasil	160,0
15.05.2000	Improved Orion	MIDAS 3 Cone	Andøya	Norway
06.05.2000	Improved Orion	MIDAS 2	Andøya	Norway
06.05.2000 - 15.05.2000	Viper IIIA 1 Mini MIDAS		Andøya	Norway
	Viper IIIA 3 Falling Spheres		Andøya	Norway
02.04.2000	Skylark 7	TEXUS 38	Kiruna	Sweden	369,1
27.03.2000	Skylark 7	TEXUS 37	Kiruna	Sweden	369,2
06.02.2000	VS-30 V05	SpaceMail	Alcantara	Brasil
09.10.1999 - 13.10.1999	Balloon	Air Sampler 5	Aire sur L'Adour	France
16.08.1999 - 22.09.1999	Viper IIIA 14 Falling Spheres	TRAMP/Transisition	Andøya	Norway
	Viper IIIA 3 Chaff	TRAMP/Transisition	Andøya	Norway
14.07.1999	Black Brant VA	DROPPS 2	Andøya	Norway
06.07.1999	Improved Orion	MIDAS 1	Andøya	Norway
05.07.1999	Black Brant VA	DROPPS 1	Andøya	Norway
04.07.1999 - 16.07.1999	Viper IIIA 1 Mini Midas		Andøya	Norway
	Viper IIIA 2 Mini Dusty		Andøya	Norway
	Viper IIIA 10 Falling Spheres		Andøya	Norway
	Viper IIIA 1 Chaff		Andøya	Norway
	Super Loki 3 Chaff		Andøya	Norway
03.05.1999 - 17.05.1999	Balloon	Air Sampler 4	Kiruna	Sweden
14.05.1999	Skylark 7	MASER 8	Kiruna	Sweden	334,0
15.03.1999	VS-30 V04	Sao Marcos	Alcantara	Brasil
21.01.1999	Black Brant XII	Caper	Andøya	Norway
	Viper IIIA 1 Falling Sphere	Caper	Andøya	Norway
03.12.1998	Nike - Improved Orion	MiniTEXUS 6	Kiruna	Sweden	198,7	2,9
24.11.1998	Castor 4B	MAXUS 3	Kiruna	Sweden	785,1
21.10.1998	Super Loki 1 Falling Sphere	Ariane 503 Support	Kourou	France
07.10.1998	Orion	MAXUS Test	Kiruna	Sweden
10.05.1998	Balloon	Ozone Sampler 3	Kiruna	Sweden
06.03.1998	Nike - Improved Orion	NLTE 2	Kiruna	Sweden	209,0
03.03.1998	Nike - Improved Orion	NLTE 1	Kiruna	Sweden	212,0
11.02.1998	Nike - Improved Orion	MiniTEXUS 5	Kiruna	Sweden	196,3	3,0
07.02.1998	Skylark 7	TEXUS 36	Kiruna	Sweden	383,2
26.01.1998	Nike - Improved Orion	Mermaid	Kiruna	Sweden	182,6	3,0
04.01.1998 - 27.02.1998	Viper IIIA 26 Falling Spheres	TRAMP/PORTA (26)	Adelaide Island (Rothera)	Antarctica
	Viper IIIA 3 Falling Spheres	RONALD 2	Andøya	Norway
31.01.1998	VS-30 V03	RONALD 2	Andøya	Norway
30.10.1997	Super Loki (Falling Spheres)	Meteorological Rocket	Kourou	France
30.10.1997	Super Loki (Falling Spheres)	Meteorological Rocket	Kourou	France
12.10.1997	VS-30 V02	Ronald 1	Andøya	Norway
	Viper IIIA 2 Falling Spheres	KANE	Andøya	Norway
	Terrier - Improved Orion	KANE	Andøya	Norway
16.08.1997	Balloon	Air Sampler 2	Kiruna	Sweden
15.07.1997 - 08.09.1997	Viper	TRAMP/Temperature	Andøya	Norway
01.05.1997	Balloon	Air Sampler 1	Kiruna	Sweden
28.04.1997	VS-30 V01	Santana	Alcantara	Brasil
24.11.1996	Skylark 7	TEXUS 35	Kiruna	Sweden	331,0
03.05.1996	Skylark 7	MASER 7	Kiruna	Sweden	355,0
02.03.1996	Skylark 7	TEXUS 34	Kiruna	Sweden	393,5
28.11.1995	Castor 4B	MAXUS 2	Kiruna	Sweden	796,7
23.11.1995	Super Loki 1 Falling Sphere	Meteorological Rocket	Kourou	France
20.11.1995	Super Loki 1 Falling Sphere	Meteorological Rocket	Kourou	France
08.10.1995	Improved Orion	Orion Testflight	Kiruna	Sweden
14.07.1995	Improved Orion	Orion Testflight	Kiruna	Sweden
02.05.1995	Nike - Improved Orion	MiniTEXUS 3	Kiruna	Sweden	200,5	2,9
29.04.1995	Nike - Improved Orion	MiniTEXUS 4	Kiruna	Sweden	162,5	2,8
28.03.1995 - 31.05.1995	Viper IIIA 21 Falling Spheres	Aerosole	Andøya	Norway
25.01.1995	Viper IIIA 1 Falling Sphere	SCIFER	Andøya	Norway
25.01.1995	Black Brant XII	SCIFER	Andøya	Norway
15.01.1995		EXPRESS	TJALIRI	Australia
30.11.1994	Skylark 7	TEXUS 33	Kiruna	Sweden	331,2
12.08.1994	Nike - Orion	Echo 94 / Cone	Andøya	Norway
31.07.1994	Nike - Orion	Echo 94 / Dusty	Andøya	Norway
28.07.1994	Nike - Orion	Echo 94 / Dusty	Andøya	Norway
22.07.1994 - 17.08.1994	Viper IIIA 12 Falling Spheres	Echo 94	Andøya	Norway
05.05.1994	Skylark 7	TEXUS 32	Kiruna	Sweden	390,1
03.05.1994	Nike - Improved Orion	MiniTEXUS 2	Kiruna	Sweden	162,0	2,9
19.02.1994	Orion	Rasmus 5	Kiruna	Sweden
29.11.1993	Nike - Improved Orion	MiniTEXUS 1	Kiruna	Sweden	160,0	2,9
26.11.1993	Skylark 7	TEXUS 31	Kiruna	Sweden	346,4
04.11.1993	Skylark 7	MASER 6	Kiruna	Sweden	372,0
02.08.1993	Nike - Orion	NLC - 93	Kiruna	Sweden
02.08.1993	Nike - Orion	NLC - 93	Kiruna	Sweden
	Viper IIIA 6 Falling Spheres	NLC - 93	Kiruna	Sweden
18.07.1993 - 19.08.1993	Viper IIIA 5 Falling Spheres	TURBO-SCALE	Andøya	Norway
	2 Nike - Orion	TURBO-SCALE	Andøya	Norway
26.05.1993	Nike - Orion	Aerospatial	CEL	France
01.05.1993	Skylark 7	TEXUS 30	Kiruna	Sweden	375,7
27.02.1993	Orion	Strafam 3/21	Kiruna	Sweden
18.02.1993	Balloon	STRAFAM 3/2	Kiruna	Sweden
10.02.1993	Balloon	STRAFAM 3/2	Kiruna	Sweden
08.02.1993	Balloon	STRAFAM 3/2	Kiruna	Sweden
22.11.1992	Skylark 7	TEXUS 29	Kiruna	Sweden	397,0
08.11.1992	Castor 4B	MAXUS 1B	Kiruna	Sweden	784,7
18.08.1992	Nike - Improved Orion	MiniTEXUS 1	Kiruna	Sweden
23.04.1992 - 03.06.1992	21 Viper IIIA	Aerosole	Andøya	Norway
11.05.1992	Balloon	Mikroba 5	Kiruna	Sweden
09.04.1992	Black Brant IX	MASER 5	Kiruna	Sweden
23.11.1991	Skylark 7	TEXUS 28	Kiruna	Sweden	381,5
04.10.1991	Nike - Orion	Turbo - Metal	Andøya	Norway
03.10.1991	Nike - Orion	Turbo - Metal	Andøya	Norway
30.09.1991	Nike - Orion	Turbo - Metal	Andøya	Norway
20.09.1991	Nike - Orion	IOMAS	Andøya	Norway
20.09.1991	Nike - Orion	Turbo - Metal	Andøya	Norway
17.09.1991	Nike - Orion	Turbo - Metal	Andøya	Norway
10.9.1991 - 04.10.1991	Super Loki / 2 Falling Spheres	Metal	Andøya	Norway
	Viper IIIA / 8 Chaff	Metal	Andøya	Norway
	Viper IIIA / 9 Falling Spheres	Metal	Andøya	Norway
Aug 1991	Nike - Improved Orion	MiniTEXUS Test	Kiruna	Sweden
09.08.1991	Nike - Orion	NLC - 91	Kiruna	Sweden
01.08.1991	Nike - Orion	NLC - 91	Kiruna	Sweden
Jul/Aug 1991	Nike - Orion	NLC - 91	Kiruna	Sweden
	Nike - Orion	NLC - 91	Kiruna	Sweden
	Black Brant V	NLC - 91	Kiruna	Sweden
	Black Brant V	NLC - 91	Kiruna	Sweden
	3 Super Arcas	NLC - 91	Kiruna	Sweden
	Viper IIIA 6 Falling Spheres	NLC - 91	Kiruna	Sweden
	Viper IIIA 2 Chaff	NLC - 91	Kiruna	Sweden
08.05.1991	Castor 4B	MAXUS 1	Kiruna	Sweden	766,2
09.04.1991	Skylark 7	Sissi 4	Kiruna	Sweden
09.04.1991	Orion	Rasmus 4	Kiruna	Sweden
Apr 1991	Super Loki 3 Data Sondes	Sissi 4	Kiruna	Sweden
Apr 1991	Viper IIIA 2 Falling Spheres	Sissi 4	Kiruna	Sweden
06.02.1991	Balloon	STRAFAM 3/1	Kiruna	Sweden
04.02.1991	Balloon	STRAFAM 3/1	Kiruna	Sweden
03.02.1991	Orion	Strafam 3/2	Kiruna	Sweden
26.01.1991	Balloon	STRAFAM 3/1	Kiruna	Sweden
26.01.1991	Balloon	STRAFAM 3/1	Kiruna	Sweden
22.01.1991	Balloon	STRAFAM 3/1	Kiruna	Sweden
18.01.1991	Balloon	STRAFAM 3/1	Kiruna	Sweden
25.11.1990	Skylark 12	MAXUS - Test (Spin Rack)	Kiruna	Sweden
15.11.1990	Skylark 7	TEXUS 27	Kiruna	Sweden	360,2
02.08.1990	Skylark 6	Sissi 3	Kiruna	Sweden
26.07.1990	Skylark 7	Sissi 2	Kiruna	Sweden
Jul/Aug 1990	Super Loki 4 Data Sondes	Sissi 3	Kiruna	Sweden
Jul/Aug 1990	Viper IIIA 2 Falling Spheres	Sissi 2	Kiruna	Sweden
23.05.1990	Balloon	Mikroba 4	Kiruna	Sweden
15.05.1990	Skylark 7	TEXUS 26	Kiruna	Sweden	381,3
13.05.1990	Skylark 7	TEXUS 25	Kiruna	Sweden	385,3
29.03.1990	Black Brant IXB	MASER 4	Kiruna	Sweden
13.03.1990	Nike - Orion	Dyana	CEL	France
06.03.1990	Nike - Orion	Dyana	CEL	France
06.03.1990	Improved Orion	Rasmus 3	Kiruna	Sweden	85,0
06.03.1990	Skylark 6	Sissi 1	Kiruna	Sweden
20.02.1990	Nike - Orion	Dyana	CEL	France
Jan-Mar 1990	Super Loki 25 Data Sondes	Dyana	Andøya	Norway
Jan-Mar 1990	Viper IIIA 24 Chaff	Dyana	Andøya	Norway
Jan-Mar 1990	Viper IIIA 35 Falling Spheres	Dyana	Andøya	Norway
Jan-Mar 1990	S520	Dyana	Andøya	Norway
Jan-Mar 1990	6 Nike - Orion	Dyana	Andøya	Norway
25.01.1990	Orion	Strafam 2/3	Kiruna	Sweden
17.01.1990 - 26.02.1990	4 Super Loki / 3 Viper IIIA		Uchinoura	Japan
06.12.1989	Skylark 7	TEXUS 24	Kiruna	Sweden	375,9
25.11.1989	Skylark 7	TEXUS 23	Kiruna	Sweden	363,7
16.08.1989 - 31.08.1989	2 Super Loki / 7 Viper IIIA		Uchinoura	Japan
08.05.1989	Balloon	Mikroba 3	Kiruna	Sweden
03.05.1989	Skylark 7	TEXUS 22	Kiruna	Sweden	410,5
30.04.1989	Skylark 7	TEXUS 21	Kiruna	Sweden	332,7
10.04.1989	Black Brant IXC	MASER 3	Kiruna	Sweden
09.02.1989	Skylark 2AC	Rose 4	Kiruna	Sweden
07.02.1989	Skylark 2AC	Rose 3	Kiruna	Sweden
30.01.1989	Orion	Strafam 2/2	Kiruna	Sweden
06.12.1988	Orion	Rasmus 2	Kiruna	Sweden
05.12.1988	Skylark 2AC	Rose 2	Andøya	Norway
02.12.1988	Skylark 7	TEXUS 20	Kiruna	Sweden	391,8
28.11.1988	Skylark 7	TEXUS 19	Kiruna	Sweden	381,7
26.11.1988	Skylark 2AC	Rose 1	Andøya	Norway
03.09.1988	Skylark 12	Interzodiak 2	Natal	Brasil
Jun/Jul 1988	Viper IIIA 10 Chaff	Mac - Sodium	Andøya	Norway
09.05.1988	Skylark 7	Test Flight	Kiruna	Sweden
06.05.1988	Nike - Black Brant V	TEXUS 18	Kiruna	Sweden	368,8
02.05.1988	Nike - Black Brant V	TEXUS 17	Kiruna	Sweden	347,0
12.04.1988	Balloon	Mikroba 2	Kiruna	Sweden
29.02.1988	Black Brant IXC	MASER 2	Kiruna	Sweden
23.11.1987	Skylark 7	TEXUS 16	Kiruna	Sweden	379,7
12.11.1987	Nike - Orion	Mac - Epsilon	Andøya	Norway
12.11.1987	Nike - Orion	Mac - Epsilon	Andøya	Norway
21.10.1987	Nike - Orion	Mac - Epsilon	Andøya	Norway
21.10.1987	Nike - Orion	Mac - Epsilon	Andøya	Norway
15.10.1987	Nike - Orion	Mac - Epsilon	Andøya	Norway
	Viper IIIA 9 Chaff	Mac - Epsilon	Andøya	Norway
	Viper IIIA 8 Falling Spheres	Mac - Epsilon	Andøya	Norway
24.08.1987	Skylark 7	Super Nova 1987A	Woomera	Australia
Jun/Jul 1987	4 Super Arcas	Mac - Sine	Andøya	Norway
Jun/Jul 1987	Stretched Super Loki 28 Chaff	Mac - Sine	Andøya	Norway
Jun/Jul 1987	Viper IIIA 27 Falling Spheres	Mac - Sine	Andøya	Norway
09.05.1987	Skylark 7	TEXUS 15	Kiruna	Sweden	379,1
06.05.1987	Orion	Rasmus 1	Kiruna	Sweden
03.05.1987	Skylark 7	TEXUS 14B	Kiruna	Sweden	372,7
30.03.1987	Balloon	MPAE Lindau	Hyderabad	India
19.03.1987	Black Brant IXB	MASER 1	Kiruna	Sweden
17.02.1987	Orion	Strafam	Kiruna	Sweden
July 1986	Nike - Orion	MAED	Kiruna	Sweden
July 1986	Nike - Orion	MAED	Kiruna	Sweden
July 1986	Nike - Orion	MAED	Kiruna	Sweden
July 1986	Super Loki 6 Falling Spheres	MAED	Kiruna	Sweden
14.05.1986	Balloon	Microba 1	Kiruna	Sweden
12.05.1986	Skylark 7	TEXUS 14	Kiruna	Sweden	372,7
30.04.1986	Skylark 7	TEXUS 13	Kiruna	Sweden	379,9
30.10.1985	Radarvermessung	NAVEX D1	DFVLR Oberpfaffenhofen	Germany
14.05.1985	Orion	Strafam	Kiruna	Sweden
06.05.1985	Skylark 7	TEXUS 12	Kiruna	Sweden	365,1
27.04.1985	Skylark 7	TEXUS 11	Kiruna	Sweden	350,5
03.03.1985	Skylark 12	Interzodiak 1	Natal	Brasil
22.02.1985	Orion	Test with CFK-Fins	Natal	Brasil
15.02.1985	Orion	Test with CFK-Fins	Natal	Brasil
30.01.1985	Skylark 12	Caesar 2	Andøya	Norway	162,9	3,4
15.05.1984	Skylark 7	TEXUS 10	Kiruna	Sweden	375,8
03.05.1984	Skylark 7	TEXUS 9	Kiruna	Sweden	359,0
18.02.1984	Nike - Orion	Map - Wine	Andøya	Norway	171,0	4,2
16.02.1984	Nike - Orion	Map - Wine	Andøya	Norway	171,0	4,2
10.02.1984	Nike - Orion	Map - Wine	Andøya	Norway	170,0	4,1
10.02.1984	Skylark 7	Map - Wine	Kiruna	Sweden
31.01.1984	Orion	Strafam	Kiruna	Sweden
31.01.1984	Nike - Orion	Map - Wine	Andøya	Norway	170,0	4,1
27.01.1984	Skylark 12	Caesar 1	Andøya	Norway	160,0	3,4
25.01.1984	Nike - Orion	Map - Wine	Andøya	Norway	171,0	4,2
13.01.1984	Nike - Orion	Map - Wine	Andøya	Norway	170,0	4,1
06.01.1983	Nike - Orion	Map - Wine	Andøya	Norway	159,0	3,9
07.12.1983	Nike - Orion	Map - Wine	Andøya	Norway	149,5	3,8
02.12.1983 - 23.02.1984	Stretched Super Loki 14 Chaff	Map - Wine	Andøya	Norway
	Super Loki 4 Chaff	Map - Wine	Andøya	Norway
	Super Loki 35 Data Sondes	Map - Wine	Andøya	Norway
	Viper IIIA 58 Falling Spheres	Map - Wine	Andøya	Norway
05.10.1983	Balloon	MPAE Lindau	Mendoza	Argentina
19.09.1983	OL (liquid)	Ortrag	Kiruna	Sweden
13.05.1983	Skylark 7	TEXUS 8	Kiruna	Sweden	348,8
05.05.1983	Skylark 7	TEXUS 7	Kiruna	Sweden	374,6
27.04.1983	Orion	Strafam	Kiruna	Sweden
09.09.1982	Aries	Conestoga I Test Flight	Matagorda	USA
03.08.1982	Nike - Orion	Strafam	Kiruna	Sweden
08.05.1982	Skylark 7	TEXUS 6	Kiruna	Sweden	368,5
29.04.1982	Skylark 7	TEXUS 5	Kiruna	Sweden	373,0
09.12.1981	Skylark 7	Energiebilanz (E 2)	Kiruna	Sweden
14.11.1981	Orion	Strafam	Kiruna	Sweden
08.05.1981	Skylark 7	TEXUS 4	Kiruna	Sweden	365,5
30.04.1981	Skylark 7	TEXUS 3B	Kiruna	Sweden	373,5
01.12.1980	Nike - Orion	Energiebilanz	Kiruna	Sweden
01.12.1980	Nike - Orion	Energiebilanz	Kiruna	Sweden
16.11.1980	Skylark 7	Energiebilanz	Kiruna	Sweden
16.11.1980	Nike - Orion	Energiebilanz	Kiruna	Sweden
11.11.1980	Nike - Orion	Energiebilanz	Kiruna	Sweden
	Petrel	Energiebilanz	Kiruna	Sweden
	Taurus - Orion	Energiebilanz	Kiruna	Sweden
	Taurus - Orion	Energiebilanz	Kiruna	Sweden
	Taurus - Orion	Energiebilanz	Kiruna	Sweden
	Skua 3 Chaff	Energiebilanz	Kiruna	Sweden
	Super Loki 14 Falling Spheres	Energiebilanz	Kiruna	Sweden
	Super Loki 11 Data Sondes	Energiebilanz	Kiruna	Sweden
28.11.1980	Nike - Orion	Energiebilanz	Andøya	Norway	105,0	2,8
16.11.1980	Nike - Orion	Energiebilanz	Andøya	Norway	106,0	2,8
11.11.1980	Nike - Orion	Energiebilanz	Andøya	Norway	105,0	2,8
28.04.1980	Skylark 7	TEXUS 3	Kiruna	Sweden	373,3
26.10.1979	Nike - Orion	Test Flight	Natal	Brasil
22.10.1979	Nike - Orion	Test Flight	Natal	Brasil
12.10.1979	Skylark 12	Astro - Hel	Natal	Brasil
31.03.1979	Aries	PORCUPINE, IMS Aries 4	Kiruna	Sweden
19.03.1979	Aries	PORCUPINE, IMS Aries 3	Kiruna	Sweden
13.03.1979	Skylark 7	Astro 4 / 1	Woomera	Australia
22.02.1979	Skylark 7	Astro 4 / 2	Woomera	Australia
16.11.1978	Skylark 7	TEXUS 2	Kiruna	Sweden	360,0
13.09.1978	Orion	Basic Orion Test Flight	Kiruna	Sweden
31.03.1978 - 18.04.1978	76 Meteorological Rockets		Andøya	Norway
02.02.1978	Orion	Basic Orion Test Flight	Andøya	Norway	45,0	1,9
30.01.1978	Skylark 12	IMS - Teilsturm/NL-T	Andøya	Norway	202,5	3,7
30.01.1978	Skylark 12	IMS - Teilsturm/NL-T	Andøya	Norway	202,5	3,7
13.12.1977	Skylark 7	TEXUS	Kiruna	Sweden	347,0
02.11.1977	Skylark 12	IMS - Teilsturm/NL-T	Andøya	Norway	202,5	3,7
13.10.1977	Skylark 12	IMS - Teilsturm/NL-T	Andøya	Norway	202,5	3,7
10.06.1977	Black Brant V	Heatpipe 2	Huelva	Spain
20.03.1977	Aries	PORCUPINE, IMS Aries 2	Kiruna	Sweden
16.03.1977	Skylark 7	Polare Hochatmosphäre	Andøya	Norway	308,5	5,0
20.02.1977	Skylark 7	Polare Hochatmosphäre	Andøya	Norway	308,5	5,0
08.02.1977	Skylark 7	Polare Hochatmosphäre	Andøya	Norway	283,0	5,0
26.01.1977	Aries	Astro 8/2	White Sands	USA
22.01.1977	Skylark 7	Polare Hochatmosphäre	Andøya	Norway	282,0	5,0
1976 - 1977	Radar Measurement	MRCA / TORNADO	Workerszell	Germany
17.07.1976	Skylark 7	SL 1402	Huelva	Spain
27.06.1976	Black Brant IV	Astro	Huelva	Spain
30.03.1976	Aries	PORCUPINE, IMS Aries 1	Kiruna	Sweden
10.03.1976	Black Brant IV	Astro 6	Huelva	Spain
22.01.1976	Skylark 7	Heatpipe 1	Kiruna	Sweden
21.01.1976	Nike - Apache	Winteranomalie	Huelva	Spain
21.01.1976	Cuckoo - Raven	Winteranomalie	Huelva	Spain
04.01.1976	Nike - Apache	Winteranomalie	Huelva	Spain
04.01.1976	Cuckoo - Raven	Winteranomalie	Huelva	Spain
09.10.1975	Skylark 7	MPI Lindau Astro 7	Huelva	Spain
17.05.1975	Balloon	Spectro-Stratoscope	Palestine	USA
14.03.1975	Skylark 7	ASTRO 1/2, MPE Garching	Woomera	Australia
11.01.1975	Black Brant IV	MPE Garching	Greenland	Greenland
18.12.1974	Black Brant IV	MPE Garching	Greenland	Greenland
17.12.1974	Black Brant IV	MPE Garching	Greenland	Greenland
07.10.1974	Skylark 7	SL 1304 / Astro 9, MPE Garching	Huelva	Spain
07.05.1974	Research Flight Vehicle (liquid engine)	ERNO Test Flight	CEL	France
Mar 1974	Black Brant IV	MPE Garching	Andøya	Norway
06.02.1974	Black Brant IV	MPE Garching	Andøya	Norway
16.01.1974	Skylark 7	MPE Garching	Huelva	Spain
11.01.1974	Skua 3 Chaff	MPE Garching	Huelva	Spain
11.01.1974	Super Loki 2 Falling Spheres	MPE Garching	Huelva	Spain
27.11.1973	Skylark 7	ESRO Nutzlast (S 74)	Huelva	Spain
24.11.1973	Javelin/JA-07	MPE Garching	Natal	Brasil
18.11.1973	Javelin/JA-06	MPE Garching	Natal	Brasil
06.10.1973	Skylark 7	ESRO Nutzlast (S 92)	Huelva	Spain
02.10.1973	Skylark 7	ESRO Nutzlast (S 93)	Huelva	Spain
04.07.1973	Black Brant VC	Aeros - Zusatzprogramm	Andøya	Norway	198,2	3,2
12.05.1973	Black Brant VC	Aeros - Zusatzprogramm	Andøya	Norway	169,6	2,9
16.02.1973	Black Brant VC	Ponta Negra	Natal	Brasil
07.02.1973	Black Brant VC	Ponta Negra	Natal	Brasil
03.02.1973	Black Brant VC	Ponta Negra	Natal	Brasil
01.02.1973	Black Brant VC	Ponta Negra	Natal	Brasil
13.12.1972	Cuckoo - Zenit	Uni Bern	Andøya	Norway	139,0	2,5
24.10.1972	Research Flight Vehicle (liquid engine)	ERNO Test Flight	CEL	France
10.10.1972	Research Flight Vehicle (liquid engine)	ERNO Test Flight	CEL	France
13.06.1972 - 18.03.1972	Recovery S91	ESRO
11.03.1972	Sand Hawk	MPE Garching	Thumba	India
08.03.1972	Black Brant VC	Aeros-Vorprogramm	Natal	Brasil
05.03.1972	Sand Hawk	MPE Garching	Thumba	India
03.02.1972	Black Brant V	Aeros-Vorprogramm	Natal	Brasil
16.11.1971	Skylark 2	MPE Garching	Sardinia	Italy
24.03.1971	Skylark	MPE Garching	Kiruna	Sweden
15.03.1971	Skylark	MPE Garching	Kiruna	Sweden
28.01.1971	Nike - Tomahawk	MPE Garching	Andøya	Norway	72,6	2,8
17.01.1971	Nike - Tomahawk	MPE Garching	Andøya	Norway	54,6	2,3
14.01.1971	Skylark 6	Test Flight	Aberporth	UK
16.12.1970	Nike - Tomahawk	Uni Frankfurt	Wallops	USA
10.12.1970	Nike - Tomahawk	Uni Frankfurt	Wallops	USA
29.11.1970 - 09.12.1970	Recovery 3c	ESRO
22.10.1970	Nike - Apache	TU Braunschweig	Natal	Brasil
13.10.1970	Skylark 3	Uni Bonn	Sardinia	Italy
12.10.1970	Nike - Apache	TU Braunschweig	Natal	Brasil
08.10.1970	Nike - Apache	TU Braunschweig	Natal	Brasil
08.10.1970	Nike - Apache	TU Braunschweig	Natal	Brasil
06.10.1970	Nike - Apache	TU Braunschweig	Natal	Brasil
01.10.1970	Nike - Apache	TU Braunschweig	Natal	Brasil
10.09.1970 - 12.10.1970	Recovery 3b	ESRO
12.06.1970 - 27.06.1970	Recovery 3a	ESRO
22.03.1970	Skylark 3	Uni Bonn	Sardinia	Italy
18.03.1970	Black Brant IVA	MPI Heidelberg	Andøya	Norway	75,0	2,1
15.03.1970	Black Brant IVA	MPI Heidelberg	Andøya	Norway	75,0	2,1
08.03.1970	Black Brant VA	AZUR - Zusatzprogramm	Andøya	Norway	126,0	2,1
06.03.1970	Black Brant VA	AZUR - Zusatzprogramm	Andøya	Norway	126,0	2,1
14.02.1970	Black Brant VA	AZUR - Zusatzprogramm	Andøya	Norway	124,0	2,1
14.02.1970	Black Brant VA	AZUR - Zusatzprogramm	Andøya	Norway	124,0	2,1
02.02.1970	Black Brant VA	AZUR - Zusatzprogramm	Andøya	Norway	142,0	2,6
29.01.1970	Javelin-7001/JA-05	DVL, Nike - J-20, SAFO-IONO	Natal	Brasil
26.01.1970	Javelin-7001/JA-04	DVL, Nike - J-19, SAFO-IONO	Natal	Brasil
04.07.1969 - 28.07.1969	Recovery 1 + Recovery 2	ESRO
17.03.1969	Nike - Apache	MPE Garching	Kiruna	Sweden
16.03.1969	Nike - Apache	TH Bochum	Kiruna	Sweden
15.03.1969	Nike - Apache	MPE Garching	Kiruna	Sweden	27,0	1,4
04.12.1968	Black Brant III	TU Braunschweig	Kiruna	Sweden	48,0	2,7
03.12.1968	Black Brant III	TU Braunschweig	Kiruna	Sweden
19.11.1968	Black Brant III	TU Braunschweig	Kiruna	Sweden	48,1	2,7
12.06.1968	Nike - Apache	MPI Heidelberg	Kiruna	Sweden	35,0	2,1
11.06.1968	Nike - Apache	MPI Heidelberg	Kiruna	Sweden	35,0	2,1
06.04.1968	Nike - Apache	MPE Garching	Kiruna	Sweden	28,8	1,5
23.03.1968	Nike - Apache	MPE Garching	Kiruna	Sweden
20.03.1968	Nike - Apache	MPE Garching	Kiruna	Sweden	28,8	1,5
05.12.1967	Nike - Apache	TU Braunschweig	Kiruna	Sweden	26,7	1,5
30.09.1967 - 12.11.1967	Nike - Apache	MPE Garching	Kiruna	Sweden
23.10.1967	Nike - Apache	TU Braunschweig	Kiruna	Sweden	28,8	1,5
11.04.1967	Nike - Apache	MPE Garching	Kiruna	Sweden	22,8	1,5
10.04.1967	Nike - Apache	MPE Garching	Kiruna	Sweden	22,8	1,5
09.04.1967	Nike - Apache	MPE Garching	Kiruna	Sweden	22,8	1,5
08.04.1967	Nike - Apache	MPE Garching	Kiruna	Sweden	22,8	1,5
07.04.1967	Nike - Apache	MPE Garching	Kiruna	Sweden	22,8	1,5
21.05.1966	Arcas	Total Eclipse, MPE Garching	Karystos	Greece
20.05.1966	Centaure	Total Eclipse, MPE Garching	Karystos	Greece
20.05.1966	Centaure	Total Eclipse, MPE Garching	Karystos	Greece
20.05.1966	Arcas	Total Eclipse, MPE Garching	Karystos	Greece
20.05.1966	Arcas	Total Eclipse, MPE Garching	Karystos	Greece
20.05.1966	Arcas	Total Eclipse, MPE Garching	Karystos	Greece
20.05.1966	Arcas	Total Eclipse, MPE Garching	Karystos	Greece
20.05.1966	Arcas	Total Eclipse, MPE Garching	Karystos	Greece
20.05.1966	Sparrow Arcas	Total Eclipse, MPE Garching	Karystos	Greece
20.05.1966	Sparrow Arcas	Total Eclipse, MPE Garching	Karystos	Greece
20.05.1966	Sparrow Arcas	Total Eclipse, MPE Garching	Karystos	Greece
20.05.1966	Sparrow Arcas	Total Eclipse, MPE Garching	Karystos	Greece
20.05.1966	Sparrow Arcas	Total Eclipse, MPE Garching	Karystos	Greece
15.05.1966	Arcas	Total Eclipse, MPE Garching	Karystos	Greece
15.05.1966	Centaure	Total Eclipse, MPE Garching	Karystos	Greece
15.05.1966	Sparrow Arcas	Total Eclipse, MPE Garching	Karystos	Greece

== See also ==
- Sounding rocket
- List of sounding rockets
- List of orbital launch systems
- List of rockets launched from Esrange
