= USN (disambiguation) =

The USN or United States Navy is the naval warfare service branch of the United States Armed Forces and one of the seven uniformed services of the United States.

USN may also refer to:

- University School of Nashville
- University of Southeast Norway
- IATA Code for Ulsan Airport in Ulsan, South Korea
- Ubiquitous Sensor Network
- USN (Update Sequence Number) Journal, a part of the NTFS file system
- United States dollar (next day), currency code
- United States Note, paper money issued by the US Treasury between 1862 and 1971
- Universal Space Network, a company providing space communication services
- Usn, the symbol for the chemical element Unseptnilium
- Udham Singh Nagar district, a district in the state of Uttarakhand, India
- Uttarakhand Solidarity Network, a non profit organisation of Uttarakhandi Indian diaspora based in Boston, Massachusetts
