= SSC Space =

Swedish government-owned space company

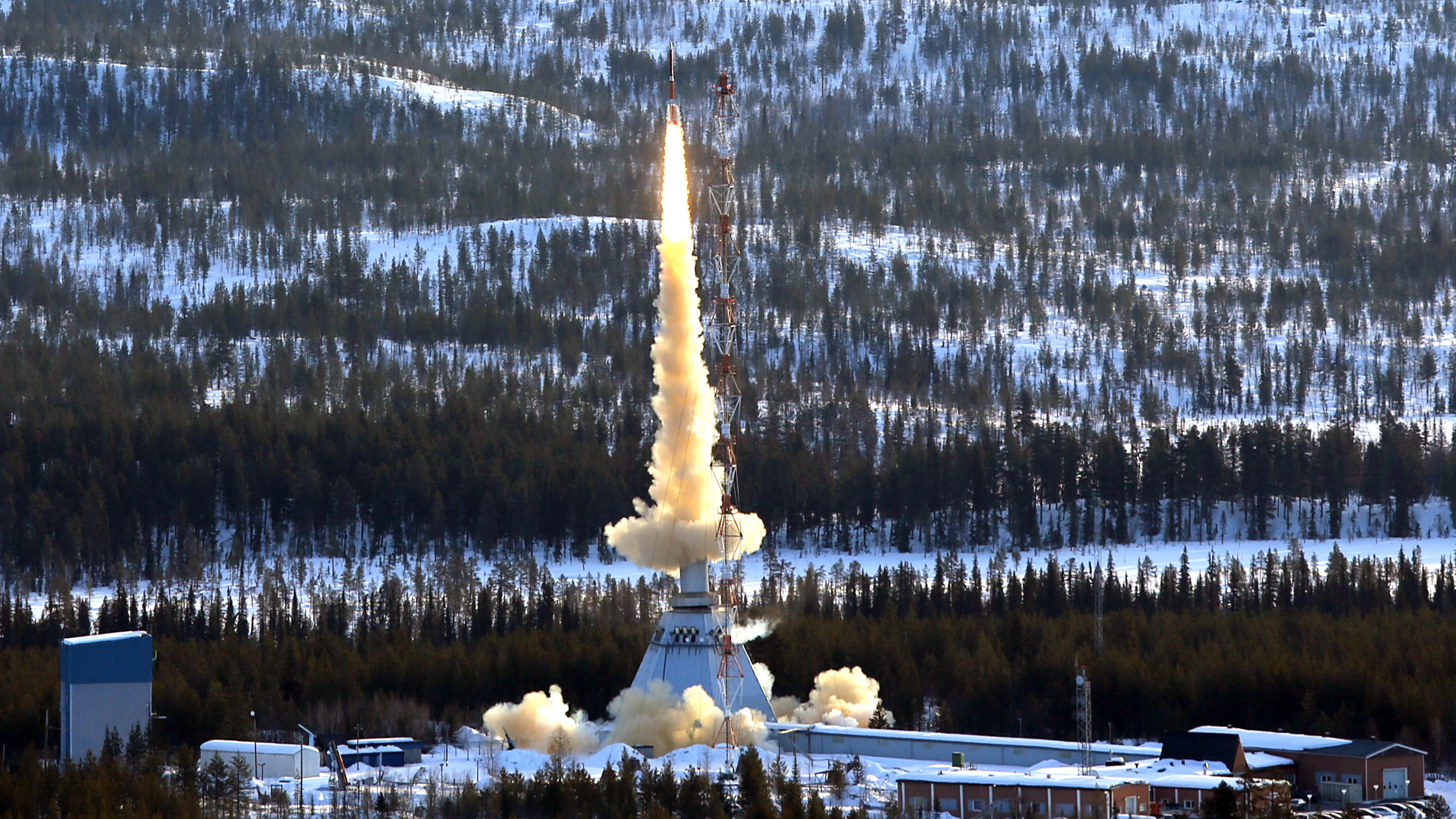
- Sounding rocket TEXUS-50 launched from Esrange Space Center.
- Type: Government-owned
- Industry: Space
- Founded: 1972; 54 years ago in Solna, Sweden
- Headquarters: Solna, Sweden
- Key people: Joakim Westh (chair of the board); Charlotta Sund (CEO)
- Services: Satellite communications and satellite control, spacecraft operations, rocket and balloon systems, launch and flight test, as well as engineering, operations and consultancy services for space missions.
- Number of employees: 713 (2024)
- Website: www.sscspace.com
- Footnotes; SSC's Annual and Sustainability Report 2024: https://sscspace.com/wp-content/uploads/2025/07/SSC-Annual-and-Sustainability-Report-2024_EN.pdf

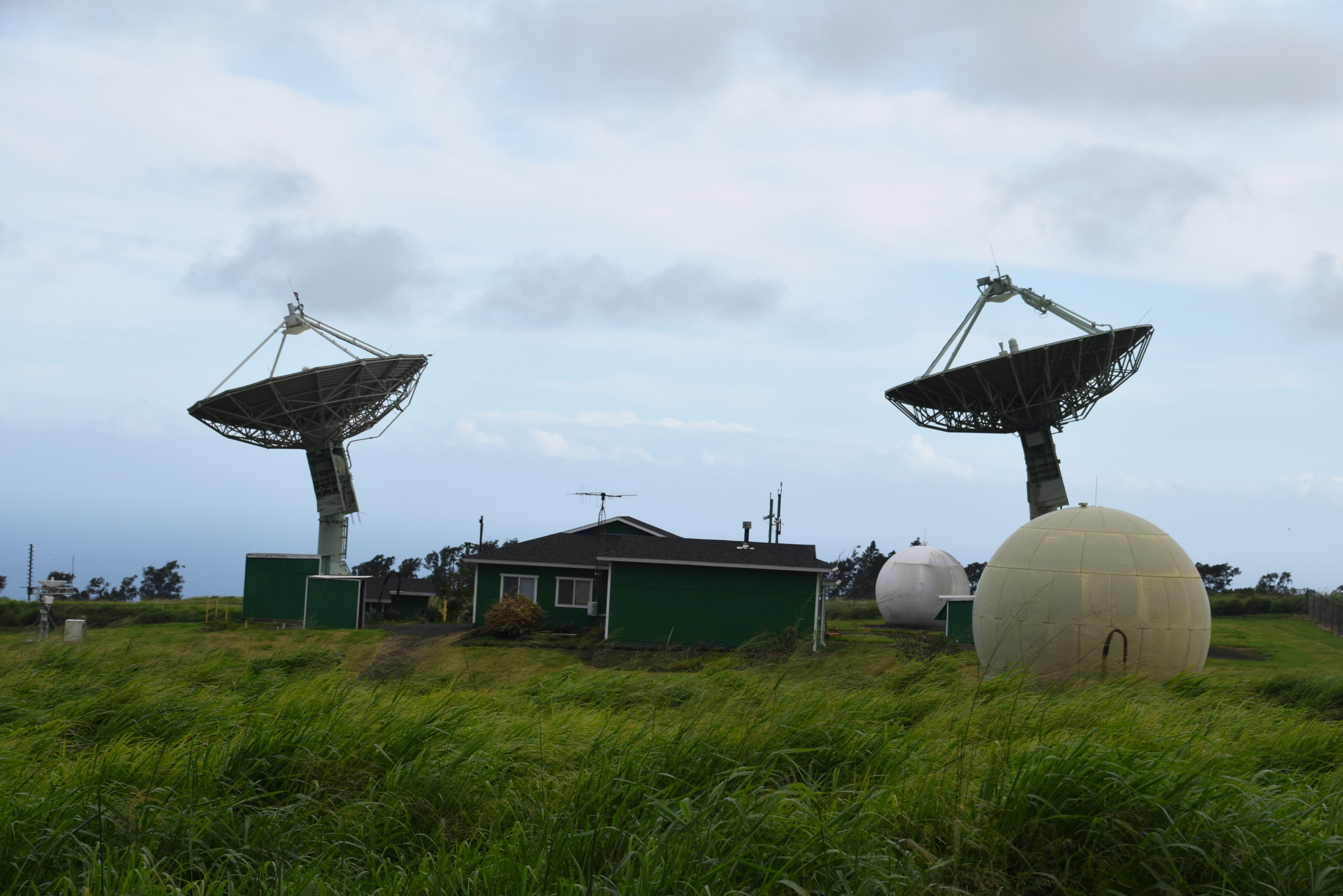
South Point station, Hawaii, US

SSC Space (previously known as Swedish Space Corporation, SSC), registered as SSC Space AB, is a Swedish space services company. SSC Space operations consist of launches of sounding rockets and stratospheric balloons, tests of future generation rockets, rocket engines and new rocket fuels, operation and maintenance of spacecraft and aviation systems, as well as satellite communication and data downlink through the use of SSC Space global ground station network with antennas deployed around the world.

In January 2023, a new establishment at the company's space center in northern Sweden, Esrange Space Center, was inaugurated – the first facility on EU mainland with the capability of launching satellites. The first satellite launch is expected to take place in a few years' time, with U.S. company Firefly Aerospace' Alpha rocket. That same facility is also housing Europe’s program for the development of reusable rockets, Themis, run by Ariane Group on behalf of the European Space Agency (ESA), set for a first hop-test in 2026.

SSC Space operations in Sweden are located in Solna, Kiruna and Ågesta. The company also has operations in the United States, Australia, Thailand, Chile, Japan, the Netherlands, Germany, Spain, Italy, and the United Kingdom. SSC Space has close to 800 employees and an MSEK 1 744 turnover in 2024.

SSC Space is also working on developing its Space Surveillance Tracking (SST) and Space Traffic Management (STM) programs with the aim to identify, assess and minimize risks of collisions and disruptions associated with space debris.

== Business areas ==
=== Development of space systems ===
SSC Space has more than fifty years of experience in helping space agencies, companies, commercial actors and research institutes gain access to space. The company designs, develops and tests various types of payloads and space systems; rocket systems, subsystems and experimental equipment for research, in space or near-space environments. Common areas of application are microgravity experiments, atmospheric research and testing and validation of space-related systems. These projects are launched onboard sounding rockets or stratospheric balloons from the company's space center in northern Sweden, Esrange Space Center.

=== Satellite communications ===
SSC Space has one of the world's largest and most active civilian networks of ground stations that communicate with various types of satellites. SSC Space worldwide network of ground stations uses the group's own as well as contracted satellite stations around the world. SSC Space has its own ground stations in Sweden, the U.S., Canada, Chile, Thailand and Australia. The company also has partnering ground stations in the U.S., Germany, Italy, Spain, Latvia, South Africa, Antarctica, India and Japan.

Most scientific satellites, as well as many Earth observation satellites, orbit the Earth's poles. The strategic locations of Esrange Space Center in northern Sweden, Inuvik in Canada, and North Pole in Alaska, in the northern hemisphere, allow for regular contact with satellites as they pass within range several times a day. Esrange is today one of the world's most used satellite stations.

Via a selection of ground stations with specific capabilities, SSC Space offers communication links between Earth and lunar and deep-space spacecraft. Past missions include Firefly Aerospace’s historic Blue Ghost Mission-1 (BGM1) in 2025, as well as the Indian Space Agency (ISRO) Chandrayaan-3 mission in 2023-24.

=== Spacecraft operations ===
Through the company's subsidiaries LSE Space in Germany, Spain and Italy, as well as Aurora Technology in the Netherlands, SSC offers consulting services in spacecraft control. The majority of this personnel is stationed at some of Europe's largest space missions operations centers – such as the European Space Operations Centre (ESOC), the European Space Astronomy Centre (ESAC), the European Space Research and Technology Centre (ESTEC), and the German Space Operations Center (GSOC) – owned and operated by the European Space Agency (ESA) and the German Aerospace Center (DLR).

=== Satellite (orbital) launch ===
At Esrange Space Center, owned and operated by SSC Space, a new facility was inaugurated on 13 January 2023 by H.M. King Carl XVI Gustaf, Swedish Prime Minister Ulf Kristersson and European Commission President Ursula von der Leyen. This will be the first facility on EU mainland with the ability to launch satellites into orbit, with a first satellite launch expected to take place in a few years' time, with U.S. company Firefly Aerospace's rocket Alpha, and later on South Korean company Perigee Aerospace's rocket BlueWhale-1.

=== Rocket testing ===
Esrange Space Center is also housing several testbed facilities where European rocket companies are developing new rocket models through motor tests and rocket reuse demonstrations; Isar Aerospace conducting motor tests of their rocket Spectrum, Rocket Factory Augsburg (RFA) on their rocket RFA One as well as Europe’s program for the development of reusable rockets, Themis, which is run by Ariane Group on behalf of the European Space Agency (ESA), set for a first hop-test in 2026.

=== Space Situational Awareness ===
The number of satellites in near-Earth space is expected to reach nearly 10,000 within the next few years. In that same area of space, large amounts of space debris are also in orbit. It is estimated to be more than 130 million objects, some as small as a millimeter, traveling at high speed around the Earth.

The increasing number of objects in orbit around the Earth increases the risk of collisions. SS Space is therefore expanding its initiative in the area of Space Situational Awareness (SSA), which aims to detect, predict and assess the risks of spacecraft launches and re-entry.

SSC Space runs a program whose task is to track and catalog the objects in orbit around the Earth – so-called Space Traffic Management (STM) – a communication system to avoid potential collisions during launch and for satellites in orbit in the future.

== Esrange Space Center ==
Esrange Space Center, a hub for SSC Space operations, is located outside Kiruna in northern Sweden, above the Arctic Circle (68°N, 21°E). In addition to the infrastructure that forms the base site, there is also access to a large, unpopulated impact and recovery area covering an area twice the size of Luxembourg (about 5,200 km^{2}). The facility has been in operation since 1966 and was initially part of the European Space Agency (ESA) before becoming a part of SSC Space as the company was founded in 1972.

With all business areas represented at Esrange, the base is an active part of Europe's space activities. SSC Space launches sounding rockets and stratospheric balloons for research in various research disciplines. The base is also the node of SSC Space ground segment, the world's second largest commercial ground station network, with more than 30 antennas on site.

== Other facilities and places of business ==
- Solna (headquarters and payload development center)
- Esrange Space Center, Kiruna (launch and test services and satellite communications)
- Ågesta (teleport services)
- North Pole, Alaska, USA (satellite station)
- Clewiston, Florida, USA (satellite station)
- Spring House, Pennsylvania, USA (office and Network Management Center)
- South Point, Hawaii, USA (satellite station)
- Inuvik, Canada (satellite station)
- Wescott, UK (office)
- Darmstadt, Germany (office)
- Gilching, Germany (office)
- Noordwijk, Netherlands (office)
- Pisa, Italy (office)
- Tokyo, Japan (office)
- Santiago, Chile (office and satellite station)
- Punta Arenas, Chile (satellite station)
- Siracha, Thailand (satellite station)
- Western Australia Space Center, Australia (office and satellite station)

== Customers ==
The largest customers of SSC Space in space systems development and launch services are the European Space Agency (ESA), German Aerospace Center (DLR) and NASA, as well as the Swedish National Space Agency (SNSA). Spacecraft operation and engineering services are performed on behalf of spacecraft owners, satellite operators and space agencies worldwide. Tests of space and flight systems are conducted for both Swedish and foreign companies as well as the armed forces.

== History ==
"Rymdbolaget" was established by the Swedish government in 1972 to be the executive body for the State Delegation for Space operations, now under the name of Swedish National Space Agency (SNSA). The company was formed in 1972 by Esrange Space Center and Rymdtekniska Gruppen in Solna, Stockholm. During the period 1966–1972, Esrange was an ESA owned facility but in 1972 the ownership passed into Swedish ownership in connection with the formation of Rymdbolaget. Today, SSC Space has no official duties, and the company is 100 percent owned by the Swedish state.

Since the turn of the millennium, the company has expanded and now has operations in Australia, Chile, the Netherlands, Thailand, Germany, the US and the UK. For instance, in 2000, SSC Space acquired Universal Space Network, USN, a company founded by space pioneer and astronaut Charles "Pete" Conrad, Jr. He was the third human to walk the Moon. The acquirement of USN, nowadays part of SSC Space, marks the starting point in which SSC Space began establishing a global ground station network which today is one of the biggest civilian networks in the world. The acquisition is also reflected in today's growth into the lunar market.

Over the years, SSC Space has also designed and built satellites, developed airborne ocean surveillance systems used by coastguard organizations worldwide, as well as assisted the Swedish Defence Materiel Administration, FMV, with the operation, maintenance, and development of test systems at the Vidsel test site. All of these businesses have today been divested.

=== Scientific satellites developed ===
- Prisma satellites – launched 15 June 2010
- SMART-1 – launched 27 September 2003
- Odin – launched 20 February 2001
- Astrid 2 – launched 10 December 1998
- Astrid 1 – launched 24 January 1995
- Freja – launched 6 October 1992
- Viking – launched 22 February 1986

=== Telecom satellite project management ===
- Tele-X
- Sirius W
- Sirius 2
- Sirius 3

=== Rocket program at Esrange (selection) ===
- MASER / SubOrbital Express
- MAXUS
- SPIDER
- REXUS
- TEXUS
- MAPHEUS
- SERA
- STERN
- BOLT

=== Balloon program at Esrange (selection) ===
- SAMBO
- PIROG
- CHEOPS
- STRAFAM
- EASOE
- THESEO
- ARCHEOPS
- ENVISAT
- SUNRISE
- POGO
- HADT
- HEMERA
- BEXUS

=== Wholly owned subsidiaries ===
- Aurora Technology, Noordwijk, The Netherlands (satellite operations consultants)
- LSE Space, Munich and Darmstadt, Germany (satellite operations consultants)
- GlobalTrust, Winchester, UK (satellite data analysis)
