= Malemute =

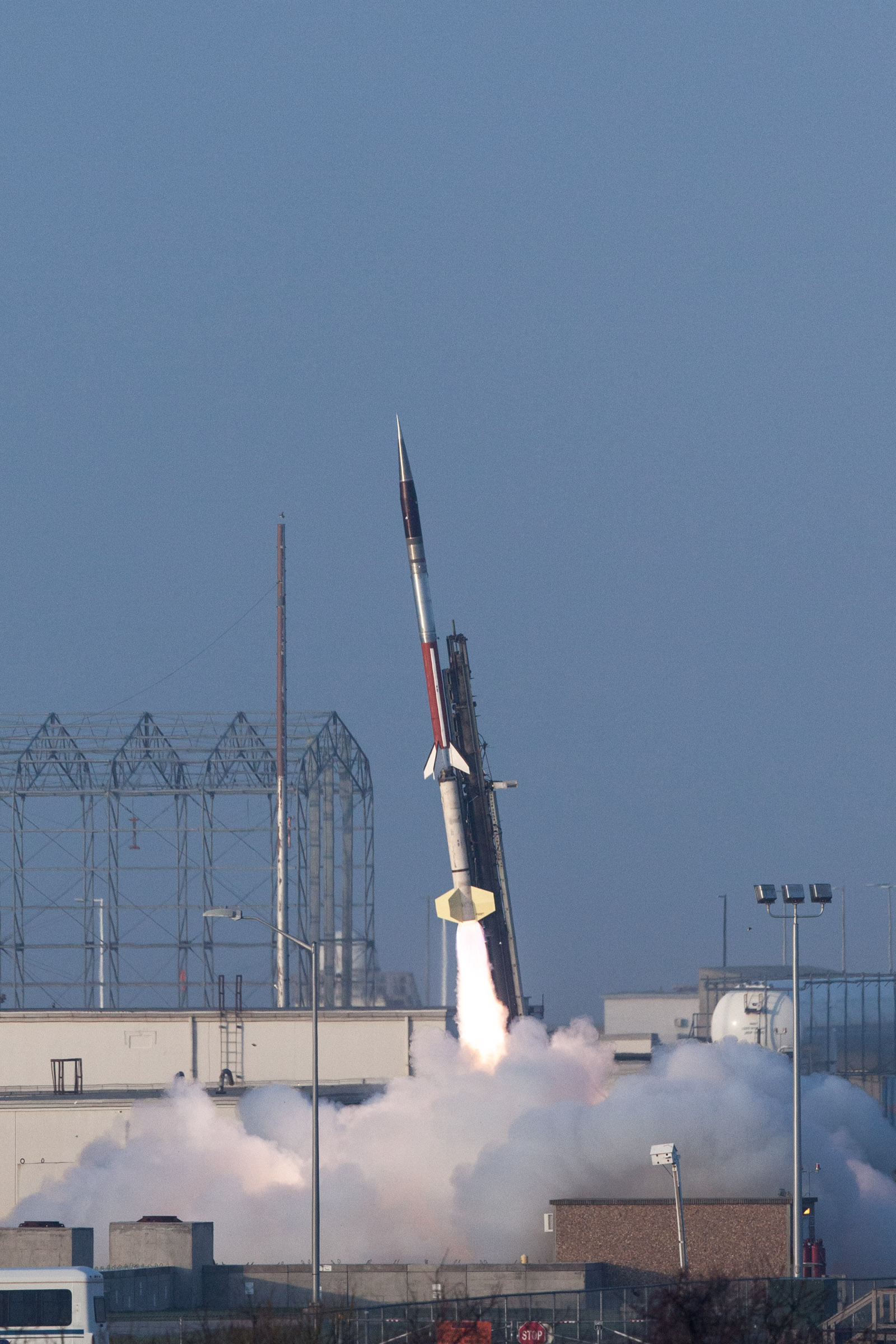
Launch of Terrier Improved Malemute from the Wallops Flight Facility

Malemute is the designation of an American sounding rocket family. The original Malemute had a maximum flight altitude of 165 km, a liftoff thrust of 57.00 kN, a total mass of 100 kg, a diameter of 0.41 m and a total length of 2.40 m. It was a single stage vehicle powered by a Thiokol Malemute TU-758 engine, operated by Sandia National Laboratories (SNL).

It was used for used for conducting upper atmosphere research in various missions to study phenomena such as auroras, ionosphere and cosmic radiation. Over the years more advanced versions were developed. The original Malemute was retired in 1999 but variants such as the Terrier Improved Malemute remain in service.

== Versions ==
A number of versions exist, with the addition of a second or third stages, and using different first stage engines. Improved Malemute versions are powered by surplus Thiokol TX-486-1 engines from MIM-104 Patriot missiles.

Version	First Stage	Second Stage	Third Stage
Malemute, Malemute-2	TU-758	-	-
Improved Malemute (PAAT)	TX-486-1	-	-
Improved Malemute Improved Orion (IM/IO)	TX-486-1	M112	-
Improved Malemute Improved Malemute (IM/IM)	TX-486-1	TX-486-1	-
Terrier Improved Malemute	Terrier MK12	TX-486-1	-
Terrier Improved Malemute	Terrier MK70	TX-486-1	-
S-31 Improved Malemute	S31	TX-486-1	-
Red Kite Improved Malemute	RK	TX-486-1	-
Terrier Malemute	Terrier MK12	TU-758	-
Nike Malemute	Nike M5E1	TU-758	-
S-31 Improved Malemute Improved Orion	S31	TX-486-1	M112

== Launches ==
Malemute rockets were launched from Andøya Space Center, Esrange Space Center, Kauai Test Facility, Tonopah Test Range and White Sands Missile Range.

Date	Rocket Version	Launch site	Mission
22.07.1976	Malemute	Tonopah Test Range	Sandia 497-006
24.07.1976	Malemute	Tonopah Test Range	Sandia 497-007
19.04.1979	Malemute-2	Tonopah Test Range	Sandia 497-009
01.07.1999	Malemute-2	Kauai Test Facility	TMBD Target (Slugger)
30.06.2016	Improved Malemute	Andøya Space Center	MaxiDusty 1 (IM QUAL 1)
08.07.2016	Improved Malemute	Andøya Space Center	MaxiDusty 1B (IM QUAL 2)
17.02.2018	S-31 Improved Malemute	Esrange Space Center	MAPHEUS 7
13.04.2018	Improved Malemute	Andøya Space Center	PMWE 1
13.04.2018	Improved Malemute	Andøya Space Center	PMWE 2
20.02.2020	Improved Malemute	Esrange Space Center	SPIDER 2
24.05.2021	Improved Malemute Improved Malemute	Esrange Space Center	MAPHEUS 11
12.08.2021	Improved Malemute	White Sands Missile Range	ET-2 (Economical Target 2)
07.09.2021	Improved Malemute	White Sands Missile Range	ET-2 (Economical Target 2)
01.10.2021	Improved Malemute	Andøya Space Center	PMWE 3
01.10.2021	Improved Malemute	Andøya Space Center	PMWE 4
06.12.2021	Improved Malemute Improved Malemute	Esrange Space Center	MAPHEUS 10
29.01.2022	Improved Malemute Improved Malemute	Esrange Space Center	MAPHEUS 9
21.10.2022	Improved Malemute Improved Malemute	Esrange Space Center	MAPHEUS 12
23.03.2023	Improved Malemute Improved Orion	Esrange Space Center	BROR
22.05.2023	Improved Malemute Improved Malemute	Esrange Space Center	MAPHEUS 13
24.01.2025	Improved Malemute	Esrange Space Center	ORIGIN I
05.07.2025	Improved Malemute	Andøya Space Center	MaxiDusty-2
