= Rexus/Bexus =

Logo of the program

The REXUS/BEXUS (Rocket Experiments for University Students / Balloon Experiments for University Students) programme is a cooperation between the German Aerospace Center (DLR) and the Swedish National Space Agency (SNSA) that allows students from higher education institutions to study experiments on board sounding rockets and stratospheric balloons. Through a collaboration with the European Space Agency (ESA), the opportunity has been made available for students across all ESA Member States, Slovenia and Canada. The Swedish Space Corporation (SSC) and the Mobile rocket base (MORABA) of DLR are responsible for the launch. Students are getting support from experts of DLR, ESA, SSC and ZARM. The programme started in 2007.

Each year, two REXUS rockets and two BEXUS balloons are launched from the Esrange Space Center in northern Sweden. A maximum of 20 experiments designed and built by student teams are flown every year. As of 2017, 147 experiments involving more than 1200 students from all over Europe were successfully launched. The launch vehicles are suitable for carrying research in various scientific areas such as atmospheric science, radiation physics, control systems, communication, aerodynamics and more.

== REXUS rocket ==
REXUS
Size
- Height: 5.6 m
- Diameter: 356 mm
- Stages: Single stage

Launch history
- Launch sites: Esrange Space Center
- Total launches: 36

Single stage
- Powered by: Improved Orion

REXUS rockets are launched from Esrange on an annual basis (nominally 2 rockets per year). The rocket is spin-stabilised and powered by 290 kg of an Improved Orion motor. The rocket can embed up to 40 kg of experiments to an altitude of 70 to 90 km. The peak acceleration of the rocket is about 17 g. A yo-yo de-spin system is used to reduce the spin rate of the rocket from 4 Hz to 0.08 Hz before reaching the apogee. The nosecone can be ejected during flight. As of March 2026, 36 REXUS rockets have been launched.

REXUS is part of the rocket family operated by the Mobile Rocket Base (MORABA), a branch of DLR.

== BEXUS balloon ==
BEXUS balloons are launched from Esrange on an annual basis (nominally 2 balloons per year). BEXUS consists of a 12,000 m^{3} Zodiac 12 SF plastic balloon filled with helium gas. It can lift up to 100 kg of experiments to an altitude of 25–35 km during a period of 2 to 5 hours. The length of the balloon train from the top of the balloon to the gondola is about 65 to 100 m. As of 2019, 29 BEXUS balloons have been flown.

== Experiment ==
U-PHOS (Upgraded PHP Only for Space) is one of the selected experiments of the programme.

== See also ==
- Esrange - Swedish Space Cooperation
- Texus
- Maser
- Maxus
