= Uttarakhand Solidarity Network =

The Uttarakhand Solidarity Network (USN), is at once an electronic network of individuals, a working committee, and a group of web sites dedicated to political, economic, environmental, cultural and social justice issues in the Uttarakhand state of India.

The USN traces its foundation to an address on 26 March 1995 by Indian actor Victor Banerjee to the Public Forum on Minority Rights in Toronto, Canada. His speech, entitled, "Uttarakhand: A People Denied" led the People's Front/East Indian Defence Committee to pass a resolution in support of the demand for a separate Uttarakhand state within India. A pamphlet and a petition to this effect was published and circulated.

This act of solidarity with the Uttarakhand separate state movement led to the establishment of the Uttarakhand Support Committee (USC), the only organization outside of India that would lend direct support to the Uttarakhand statehood movement until it achieved its principal goal with the formation of Uttarakhand in 2000.

In 1997, the USC was reestablished in Boston, Massachusetts after a period of inactivity. The first web site covering the Uttarakhand region was launched and its new members began raising the Uttarakhand separate state issue in various South Asian human rights fora. The following three years would witness a number of other firsts, including the 1998 launch of the Prayaga electronic newsletter and the 1999 foundation of the Uttarakhand Solidarity Network e-group. These efforts would be replicated by other individuals and groups in subsequent years. The committee would also play an active role in Uttarakhandi expatriate associations in Canada and the US, organizing the first seminar of the Uttaranchal Association of North America Convention in 2001.

With the formation of Uttarakhand in 2000, the USC began increasingly focusing on maintaining and building its web presence and taking the name of its e-group. However, the USN itself would be officially relaunched in 2004 to support ongoing social movements in the region including struggles over land, water, and forest rights and outstanding demands of the separate state movement such as relocation of the capital to Gairsain.
