= SSC Space US =

Company offering space services

SSC Space US, Inc., formerly Universal Space Network, Inc., or USN is an American company specializing in tracking, telemetry, and control of spacecraft. It is a subsidiary of Swedish Space Corporation, with four main sites and cooperative agreements with many others. USN has been used by commercial satellite operations such as Sirius XM Radio and scientific missions both in low Earth orbit (such as GALEX) and in orbit around the Moon (such as Lunar Reconnaissance Orbiter). USN has offered a 50% discount for their services for competitors for the Google Lunar X Prize.
