= Maxus (rocket) =

Sounding rocket

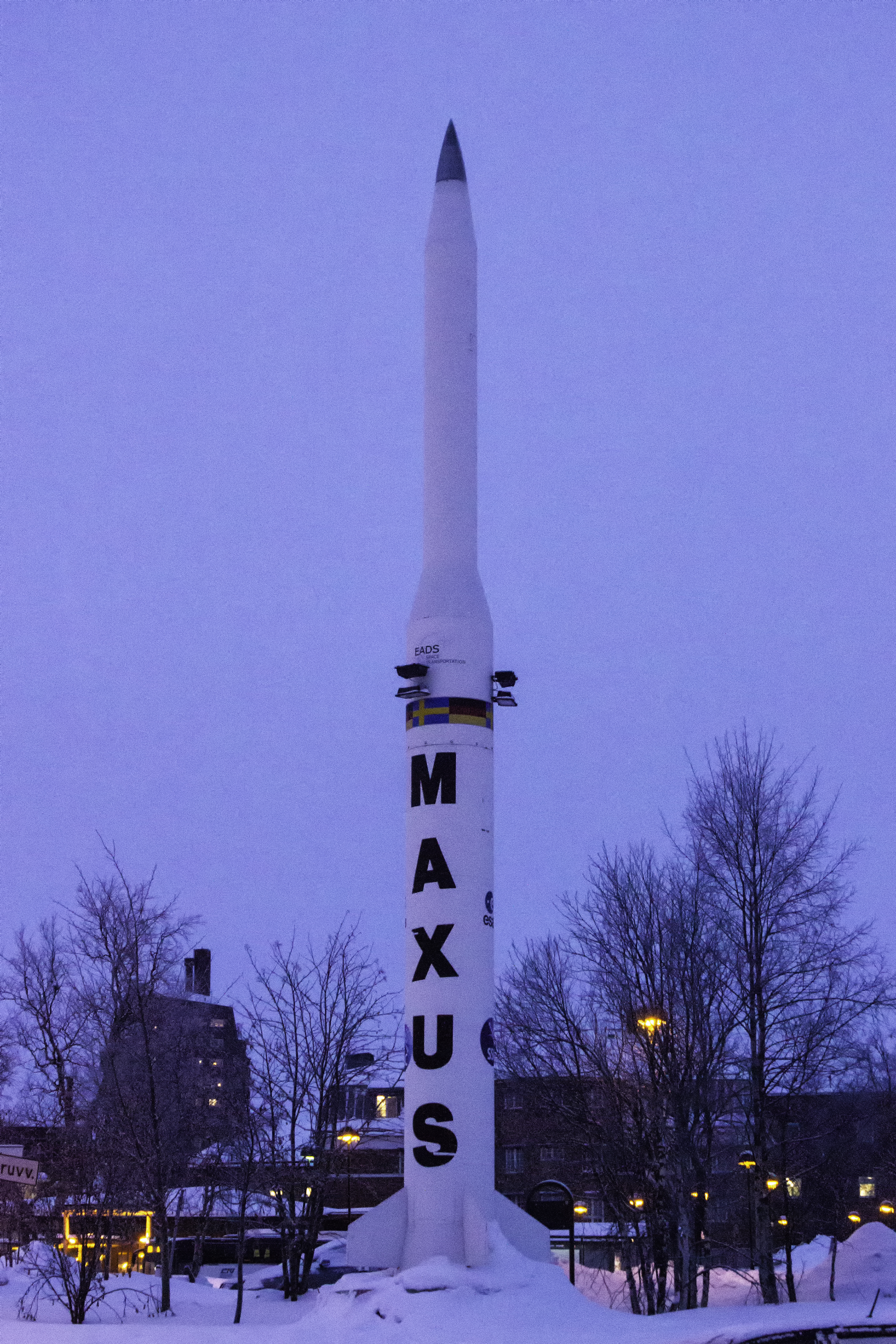
Maxus in Kiruna, Sweden

Maxus is a sounding rocket used in the MAXUS microgravity rocket programme, a joint venture between the Swedish Space Corporation and EADS Astrium Space Transportation used by ESA. It is launched from Esrange Space Center in Sweden and provides access to microgravity for up to 14 minutes.

== Technical characteristics ==
- Overall length: 15.5 m
- Overall mass: 12 400 kg
- Payload mass: approx. 800 kg
- Max. velocity: 3500 m/s
- Max. acceleration: 15 g
- Propellant mass: 10 042 kg
- Motor burn time: 63 s
- Microgravity: up to 14 minutes
- Apogee: > 700 km
- Thrust (max. in vacuum): 500 kN

== Missions ==
Mission	Date	Launch site	Motor	Apogee	Payload	Modules	Comments	Reference Report
Maxus 1	1991 May 8	Esrange	Castor 4B	154 km				
Maxus 1B	1992 Nov 8	Esrange	Castor 4B	717 km			Successful	
Maxus 2	1995 Nov 29	Esrange	Castor 4B	706 km			Successful	
Maxus 3	1998 Nov 24	Esrange	Castor 4B	713 km	798 kg	5/ESA	Successful	Esrange EUP105-99006
Maxus 4	2001 Apr 29	Esrange	Castor 4B	704 km	803 kg	5/ESA	Mostly successful; parachute failed	Esrange EUP110-E15
Maxus 5	2003 Apr 1	Esrange	Castor 4B	703 km	795 kg	5/ESA	Mostly successful; rough landing	Esrange EUP114-E114
Maxus 6	2004 Nov 22	Esrange	Castor 4B	707 km	793 kg	5/ESA	Successful	Esrange EUP117-E146
Maxus 7	2006 May 2	Esrange	Castor 4B	705 km	785 kg	5/ESA	Successful	Esrange EUP124-E36
Maxus 8	2010 March 26	Esrange	Castor 4B	703 km	803 kg	3/Astrium ST 1/SSC	Successful	
Maxus 9	2017 April 7	Esrange	Castor 4B		849 kg		Successful	

== See also ==
- Texus
- Maser
- Rexus/Bexus
- Esrange
