= Maser (rocket) =

Sounding rocket launched from Esrange in Sweden

MASER is a sounding rocket that is used in the MASER microgravity research rocket programme, operated by the Swedish Space Corporation (SSC). The main customer is the European Space Agency (ESA), particularly the EMIR and ELIPS programmes. MASER stands for "MAterials Science Experiment Rocket".

The launches take place at Esrange in Northern Sweden. Throughout its sub-orbital flight, the programme offers 6–7 minutes of microgravity aboard the rocket and full recovery of experimental modules with helicopter immediately after flight.

== Missions ==
Mission	Date	Launch site	Motor	Apogee	Payload	Modules	Comments	Reference report
MASER 1	1987 Mar 19	Esrange	Black Brant 9B	295 km				
MASER 2	1988 Feb 29	Esrange	Black Brant 9C	318 km				
MASER 3	1989 Apr 10	Esrange	Black Brant 9C	297 km		CIS-1, TEM 06-15		
MASER 4	1990 Mar 29	Esrange	Black Brant 9B	317 km		CIS-2		
MASER 5	1992 Apr 9	Esrange	Black Brant 9	309 km		CIS-3		
MASER 6	1993 Nov 4	Esrange	Skylark 7	243 km	372 kg	5/ESA		Esrange EKMA93-12
MASER 7	1996 May 3	Esrange	Skylark 7	252 km	355 kg	4/ESA		Esrange EUK113-9616
MASER 8	1999 May 14	Esrange	Skylark 7	260 km	334 kg	4/ESA		Esrange SUM8251-D18
MASER 9	2002 Mar 16	Esrange	Skylark 7	258 km	347 kg	3/ESA		Esrange SUM92-S14
MASER 10	2005 May 2	Esrange	Skylark 7	252 km	350 kg	4/ESA	441st and final Skylark	Esrange SUM1025-S8
MASER 11	2008 May 15	Esrange	VSB-30	252 km	383 kg	5/ESA		Esrange EUK175-E60
MASER 12	2012 Feb 13	Esrange	VSB-30	250 km	390 kg			
MASER 13	2015 Dec 1	Esrange	VSB-30	260 km	277 kg			
MASER 14	2019 Jun 24	Esrange	VSB-30	260 km	400 kg			MASER 14
MASER 15	2022 Nov 23	Esrange	VSB-30	260 km	270 kg			

== Biological scientific endeavors ==
As humans subjected to weightlessness or microgravity undergo physiological changes, there is an increasing interest in biological research. Aside from the material science aspect being investigated aboard the MASER13-15 rockets, biological modules aim to fulfill this purpose and elucidate this side of space-related research.

== See also ==
- Maxus
- Texus
- Rexus/Bexus
- Esrange
- Swedish Space Corporation
- European Space Agency
- Sub-orbital spaceflight
- Weightlessness
