= TEXUS =

Sounding rocket program

TEXUS is a European/German sounding rocket programme, serving the microgravity programmes of ESA and DLR. The launches are conducted from Esrange in Sweden.

The first mission was conducted on 13 December 1977, using a British Skylark rocket. All missions up to TEXUS-41 in 2004 were conducted using Skylark rockets. Following the Skylark's retirement in 2005, TEXUS launches switched to the Brazilian VSB-30 rocket.

== Texus Missions ==
Mission	Date	Launch site	Motor	Apogee	Payload	Modules	Comments	Reference Report
Texus 34	1996 Mar 2	Esrange	Skylark 7	232 km	392 kg	4/DLR		Esrange EUK112-9613
Texus 35	1996 Nov 24	Esrange	Skylark 7	267 km	331 kg	4/(DLR+ESA)		Esrange EUK114-9704
Texus 36	1998 Feb 7	Esrange	Skylark 7	238 km				
Texus 37	2000 Mar 27	Esrange	Skylark 7	245 km	369 kg			Esrange EUK130-E2
Texus 38	2000 Apr 2	Esrange	Skylark 7	250 km	369 kg		Parachute failed; Science OK	Esrange EUK130-E2
Texus 39	2001 May 8	Esrange	Skylark 7	248 km	362 kg	4/DLR		Esrange EUK148-E11
Texus 40	2003 Apr 8	Esrange	Skylark 7	246 km	364 kg	4/DLR		Esrange EUK154-E19
Texus 41	2004 Dec 2	Esrange	Skylark 7	230 km	402 kg	4/DLR		Esrange EUK163-E21
Texus 42	2005 Dec 1	Esrange	VSB-30	263 km	372 kg	1/DLR, 1/ESA		
Texus 43	2006 May 11	Esrange	VSB-30	237 km	407 kg	3/ESA		Esrange EUK170-E19
Texus 44	2008 Feb 7	Esrange	VSB-30	264 km	373 kg	3/ESA		Esrange EUK173-E42
Texus 45	2008 Feb 21	Esrange	VSB-30	264 km	357 kg	2/DLR, 1/ESA		Esrange EUK174-E17
Texus 46	2009 Nov 22	Esrange	VSB-30	252 km	392.9 kg	1/ESA+DLR, 1/ESA+JAXA		
Texus 47	2009 Nov 29	Esrange	VSB-30	263.6 km	373.5 kg	4		
Texus 48	2011 Nov 30	Esrange	VSB-30	263 km			Test of propellant handling	
Texus 49	2011 Mar 29	Esrange	VSB-30	268 km	kg			
Texus 50	2013 Apr 12	Esrange	VSB-30	261 km	kg			
Texus 51	2015 Apr 23	Esrange	VSB-30	259 km	kg			
Texus 52	2015 Apr 27	Esrange	VSB-30	km	kg			
Texus 53	2016 Jan 23	Esrange	VSB-30	km	kg			
Texus 54	2018 May 13	Esrange	VSB-30	239 km	kg			
Texus 55	2018 May 31	Esrange	VSB-30	255 km	kg			
Texus 56	2019 Nov 15	Esrange	VSB-30	265 km	386 kg	3 (2x ESA, 1x DLR)		
Texus 57	2022 Oct 01	Esrange	VSB-30	240 km		4 (3x DLR, 1x ESA)		
Texus 58	2023 Apr 24	Esrange	VSB-30	250 km	387.4 kg	3 (3x ESA)	Landed in Norway	
Texus 59	2024 Feb 15	Esrange	VSB-30	264.5 km	388 kg	3 (2x ESA, 1x DLR)		
Texus 60	2024 Mar 24	Esrange	VSB-30	251.7 km	408 kg	3 (2x ESA, 1x JAXA)		

== MiniTexus Missions ==
Mission	Date	Launch site	Motor	Apogee	Payload	Modules	Comments	Reference Report
MiniTexus 1	1993 Nov 29	Esrange	Nike Orion					
MiniTexus 2	1994 May 3	Esrange	Nike Orion					
MiniTexus 3	1995 May 2	Esrange	Nike Orion	125 km	200 kg	1/DLR	Successful	Esrange EUK109-66
MiniTexus 4	1995 Apr 29	Esrange	Nike Orion	148 km	162 kg	2/DLR	Successful	Esrange EUK109-66
MiniTexus 5	1998 Feb 11	Esrange	Nike Orion					
MiniTexus 6	1998 Dec 3	Esrange	Nike Orion					

== See also ==
- Maxus
- Maser
- Rexus/Bexus
- Esrange
