= List of spaceflight launches in January–June 2024 =

This article lists orbital and suborbital launches during the first half of the year 2024.

For all other spaceflight activities, see 2024 in spaceflight. For launches in the second half of 2024, see List of spaceflight launches in July–December 2024.

== Orbital launches ==
- ← Jan
- Feb
- Mar
- Apr
- May
- Jun
- Jul
- Aug
- Sep
- Oct
- Nov
- Dec →

=== January ===
| Date and time (UTC) | Rocket | Flight number | Launch site | | LSP | |
| Date and time (UTC) | Payload (⚀ = CubeSat) | Operator | Orbit | Function | Decay (UTC) | Outcome |
| Date and time (UTC) | Remarks | | | | | |
|---|---|---|---|---|---|---|
| 1 January; 03:40 | (India) PSLV-DL | C58 | (India) Satish Dhawan FLP | | (India) ISRO | |
| 1 January; 03:40 | (India) XPoSat | ISRO / RRI | Low Earth | X-ray astronomy | In orbit | Operational |
| 1 January; 03:40 | The POEM-3 non-deployable platform was hosted on the fourth stage. | | | | | |
| 3 January; 03:44 | (United States) Falcon 9 Block 5 | Starlink Group 7-9 | (United States) Vandenberg SLC-4E | | (United States) SpaceX | |
| 3 January; 03:44 | (United States) Starlink × 15 | SpaceX | Low Earth | Communications | In orbit | Operational |
| 3 January; 03:44 | (United States) Starlink-D2C × 6 | SpaceX | Low Earth | Communications | In orbit | Operational |
| 3 January; 03:44 | Six of the 21 satellites on this mission carried the first batch of Starlink Direct-to-Cell transponders. | | | | | |
| 3 January; 23:04 | (United States) Falcon 9 Block 5 | F9-287 | (United States) Cape Canaveral SLC-40 | | (United States) SpaceX | |
| 3 January; 23:04 | (Sweden) Ovzon-3 | Ovzon | Geosynchronous | Communications | In orbit | Operational |
| 3 January; 23:04 | First Falcon 9 launch to use a return to launch site (RTLS) booster recovery profile on a launch to GTO. First commercial satellite with Roll Out Solar Array that were deployed on 10 January 2024. | | | | | |
| 5 January; 11:20 | (China) Kuaizhou 1A | Y28 | (China) Jiuquan LS-95A | | (China) ExPace | |
| 5 January; 11:20 | (China) Tianmu-1 15–18 | Xiyong Microelectronics | Low Earth (SSO) | Meteorology | In orbit | Operational |
| 7 January; 22:35:40 | (United States) Falcon 9 Block 5 | Starlink Group 6-35 | (United States) Cape Canaveral SLC-40 | | (United States) SpaceX | |
| 7 January; 22:35:40 | (United States) Starlink × 23 | SpaceX | Low Earth | Communications | In orbit | Operational |
| 8 January; 07:18:38 | (United States) Vulcan Centaur VC2S | Cert-1; V-001 | (United States) Cape Canaveral SLC-41 | | (United States) ULA | |
| 8 January; 07:18:38 | (United States) Peregrine | Astrobotic Technology | TLI to lunar surface | Lunar lander | 18 January; 20:59 | Spacecraft failure |
| 8 January; 07:18:38 | (United States) Iris | Astrobotic Technology CMU | TLI to lunar surface | CubeRover | 18 January; 20:59 | Precluded |
| 8 January; 07:18:38 | (Mexico) Colmena × 5 | UNAM | TLI to lunar surface | Lunar rover | 18 January; 20:59 | Precluded |
| 8 January; 07:18:38 | Maiden flight of Vulcan Centaur and Vulcan Centaur VC2S Configuration. Vulcan is the first methane fueled rocket to reach orbit on its first attempt, and the first to reach orbit from the US. Celestis Enterprise was hosted on the Centaur V of this Mission. Lunar landing abandoned due to excessive propellant leak from the Peregrine lander. | | | | | |
| 9 January; 07:03 | (China) Long March 2C | 2C-Y30 | (China) Xichang LC-3 | | (China) CASC | |
| 9 January; 07:03 | (China) Einstein Probe | CAS / ESA | Low Earth | X-ray astronomy | In orbit | Operational |
| 11 January; 03:52 | (China) Kuaizhou 1A | Y24 | (China) Jiuquan LS-95A | | (China) ExPace | |
| 11 January; 03:52 | (China) Tianxing-1 02 | CAS | Low Earth (SSO) | Space environment observation | In orbit | Operational |
| 11 January; 05:30 | (China) Gravity-1 | Y1 | (China) Dong Fang Hang Tian Gang platform, Yellow Sea | | (China) Orienspace | |
| 11 January; 05:30 | (China) Yunyao-1 (18-20) | CGSTL | Low Earth | Meteorology | In orbit | Operational |
| 11 January; 05:30 | Maiden flight of the Gravity-1 launch vehicle. | | | | | |
| 12 January; 04:44:26 | (Japan) H-IIA 202 | F48 | (Japan) Tanegashima LA-Y1 | | (Japan) MHI | |
| 12 January; 04:44:26 | (Japan) IGS-Optical 8 | CSICE | Low Earth (SSO) | Reconnaissance | In orbit | Operational |
| 14 January; 08:59:30 | (United States) Falcon 9 Block 5 | Starlink Group 7-10 | (United States) Vandenberg SLC-4E | | (United States) SpaceX | |
| 14 January; 08:59:30 | (United States) Starlink × 22 | SpaceX | Low Earth | Communications | In orbit | Operational |
| 15 January; 01:52 | (United States) Falcon 9 Block 5 | Starlink Group 6-37 | (United States) Cape Canaveral SLC-40 | | (United States) SpaceX | |
| 15 January; 01:52 | (United States) Starlink × 23 | SpaceX | Low Earth | Communications | In orbit | Operational |
| 17 January; 14:27:30 | (China) Long March 7 | Y8 | (China) Wenchang LC-2 | | (China) CASC | |
| 17 January; 14:27:30 | (China) Tianzhou 7 | CMSA | Low Earth (TSS) | Space logistics | 17 November; 13:25 | Successful |
| 17 January; 14:27:30 | ⚀ (China) Nanjing (Baiyi-08) | NJIT | Low Earth | Education | In orbit | Operational |
| 17 January; 14:27:30 | Sixth Tianzhou resupply cargo flight to the Tiangong space station. | | | | | |
| 18 January; 21:49:11 | (United States) Falcon 9 Block 5 | F9-291 | (United States) Kennedy LC-39A | | (United States) SpaceX | |
| 18 January; 21:49:11 | (United States) Ax-3 | SpaceX / Axiom Space | Low Earth (ISS) | Private spaceflight | 9 February; 13:30 | Successful |
| 18 January; 21:49:11 | Axiom Mission 3, launching on Crew Dragon. 14-day commercial flight of four astronauts to the ISS. | | | | | |
| 20 January; 06:28 | (Iran) Qaem 100 | | (Iran) Shahroud Space Center | | (Iran) IRGC | |
| 20 January; 06:28 | (Iran) Soraya | ISA | Low Earth | Communications | In orbit | Operational |
| 20 January; 06:28 | First successful orbital flight of Qaem 100. | | | | | |
| 23 January; 04:03 | (China) Kinetica 1 | Y3 | (China) Jiuquan LS-130 | | (China) CAS Space | |
| 23 January; 04:03 | (China) Taijing-1-03 | MinoSpace | Low Earth (SSO) | Earth observation | In orbit | Operational |
| 23 January; 04:03 | (China) Taijing-2-02 | MinoSpace | Low Earth (SSO) | Earth observation | In orbit | Operational |
| 23 January; 04:03 | (China) Taijing-2-04 | MinoSpace | Low Earth (SSO) | Earth observation | In orbit | Operational |
| 23 January; 04:03 | (China) Taijing-3-02 | MinoSpace | Low Earth (SSO) | Earth observation | In orbit | Operational |
| 23 January; 04:03 | (China) Taijing-4-03 | MinoSpace | Low Earth (SSO) | Earth observation | In orbit | Operational |
| 24 January; 00:35 | (United States) Falcon 9 Block 5 | Starlink Group 7-11 | (United States) Vandenberg SLC-4E | | (United States) SpaceX | |
| 24 January; 00:35 | (United States) Starlink × 22 | SpaceX | Low Earth | Communications | In orbit | Operational |
| 28 January; 00:02 | (Iran) Simorgh | | (Iran) Semnan LP-2 | | (Iran) ISA | |
| 28 January; 00:02 | (Iran) Mahda | ISA | Low Earth | Technology demonstration | In orbit | Operational |
| 28 January; 00:02 | ⚀ (Iran) Hatef-1 | ISA | Low Earth | Communications | In orbit | Operational |
| 28 January; 00:02 | ⚀ (Iran) Keyhan-2 | ISA | Low Earth | Communications | In orbit | Operational |
| 28 January; 00:02 | First successful orbital flight of Simorgh. | | | | | |
| 29 January; 01:10:00 | (United States) Falcon 9 Block 5 | Starlink Group 6-38 | (United States) Kennedy LC-39A | | (United States) SpaceX | |
| 29 January; 01:10:00 | (United States) Starlink × 23 | SpaceX | Low Earth | Communications | In orbit | Operational |
| 29 January; 05:57:20 | (United States) Falcon 9 Block 5 | Starlink Group 7-12 | (United States) Vandenberg SLC-4E | | (United States) SpaceX | |
| 29 January; 05:57:20 | (United States) Starlink × 22 | SpaceX | Low Earth | Communications | In orbit | Operational |
| 30 January; 17:07:21 | (United States) Falcon 9 Block 5 | F9-295 | (United States) Cape Canaveral SLC-40 | | (United States) SpaceX | |
| 30 January; 17:07:21 | (United States) Cygnus NG-20; S.S. Patricia “Patty” Hilliard Robertson | NASA | Low Earth (ISS) | ISS logistics | 13 July; 15:00 | Successful |
| 30 January; 17:07:21 | First of three Cygnus spacecraft to be launched via Falcon 9. | | | | | |
| 31 January; 06:34 | (United States) Electron | "Four Of A Kind" | (New Zealand) Mahia LC-1B | | (United States) Rocket Lab | |
| 31 January; 06:34 | ⚀ (United States) (Canada) Skylark (Lemur-2) × 4 | Spire Global / NorthStar | Low Earth (SSO) | Space situational awareness | In orbit | Operational |
| 31 January; 06:34 | First of three dedicated launches for NorthStar Earth & Space. | | | | | |

- ← Jan
- Feb
- Mar
- Apr
- May
- Jun
- Jul
- Aug
- Sep
- Oct
- Nov
- Dec →

=== February ===
| Date and time (UTC) | Rocket | Flight number | Launch site | | LSP | |
| Date and time (UTC) | Payload (⚀ = CubeSat) | Operator | Orbit | Function | Decay (UTC) | Outcome |
| Date and time (UTC) | Remarks | | | | | |
|---|---|---|---|---|---|---|
| 2 February; 23:37 | (China) Long March 2C | 2C-Y85 | (China) Xichang LC-3 | | (China) CASC | |
| 2 February; 23:37 | (China) GeeSAT-2 × 11 (10–20) | Geespace | Low Earth | Navigation; Communications | In orbit | Operational |
| 2 February; 23:37 | Eleven GeeSAT-2 satellites for the Geely Future Mobility Constellation. | | | | | |
| 3 February; 03:06 | (China) Jielong 3 | Y3 | Bo Run Jiu Zhou platform, South China Sea | | China Rocket | |
| 3 February; 03:06 | (China) Yantai 2 (Dongfang Huiyan Gaofen O1) | Oriental Spaceport Industrial Park | Low Earth (SSO) | Earth observation | In orbit | Operational |
| 3 February; 03:06 | (China) DRO-L (Chuangxin 17-01) | CAS | Low Earth (SSO) | Technology demonstration | In orbit | Operational |
| 3 February; 03:06 | (Egypt) (Germany) NExSat-1 | NARSS / BST | Low Earth (SSO) | Technology demonstration | In orbit | Operational |
| 3 February; 03:06 | (China) Weihai-1 01 | CASIC | Low Earth (SSO) | Technology demonstration | In orbit | Operational |
| 3 February; 03:06 | (China) Weihai-1 02 | CASIC | Low Earth (SSO) | Technology demonstration | In orbit | Operational |
| 3 February; 03:06 | (China) Xingshidai-18 (Rongpiao) | ADASpace | Low Earth (SSO) | Earth observation | In orbit | Operational |
| 3 February; 03:06 | (China) Xingshidai-19 (Zhongguo Yidong 0/SCA 1) | ADASpace | Low Earth (SSO) | Earth observation | In orbit | Operational |
| 3 February; 03:06 | (China) Xingshidai-20 (Huakai Tianxia) | ADASpace | Low Earth (SSO) | Earth observation | In orbit | Operational |
| 3 February; 03:06 | (China) Zhixing-2A (SmartSat X1/Jinan Kechuang) | Smart Satellite | Low Earth (SSO) | Earth observation | In orbit | Operational |
| 3 February; 03:06 | Xingshidai-18 is the first AI commercial hyperspectral satellite in orbit. | | | | | |
| 8 February; 06:33:36 | (United States) Falcon 9 Block 5 | F9-296 | (United States) Cape Canaveral SLC-40 | | (United States) SpaceX | |
| 8 February; 06:33:36 | (United States) PACE | NASA/GSFC | Low Earth (SSO) | Earth observation | In orbit | Operational |
| 9 February; 07:03:44 | (Russia) Soyuz-2.1v | | (Russia) Plesetsk Site 43/4 | | (Russia) RVSN RF | |
| 9 February; 07:03:44 | (Russia) Razbeg №2 (Kosmos 2575) | VKS | Low Earth (SSO) | Reconnaissance | In orbit | Operational |
| 9 February; 07:03:44 | Last Launch of Soyuz-2.1v Variant of Soyuz-2 rocket. | | | | | |
| 10 February; 00:34:00 | (United States) Falcon 9 Block 5 | Starlink Group 7-13 | (United States) Vandenberg SLC-4E | | (United States) SpaceX | |
| 10 February; 00:34:00 | (United States) Starlink × 22 | SpaceX | Low Earth | Communications | In orbit | Operational |
| 14 February; 22:30 | (United States) Falcon 9 Block 5 | F9-298 | (United States) Cape Canaveral SLC-40 | | (United States) SpaceX | |
| 14 February; 22:30 | (United States) HBTSS × 2 | United States Space Force / MDA | Low Earth | Early warning | In orbit | Operational |
| 14 February; 22:30 | (United States) T0TR 5-8 (Raptor 1-4) | SDA | Low Earth | Early warning | In orbit | Operational |
| 14 February; 22:30 | USSF-124 Mission. | | | | | |
| 15 February; 03:25:05 | (Russia) Soyuz-2.1a | | (Kazakhstan) Baikonur Site 31/6 | | (Russia) Roscosmos | |
| 15 February; 03:25:05 | (Russia) Progress MS-26 / 87P | Roscosmos | Low Earth (ISS) | ISS logistics | 13 August; 05:49 | Successful |
| 15 February; 06:05:37 | (United States) Falcon 9 Block 5 | F9-299 | (United States) Kennedy LC-39A | | (United States) SpaceX | |
| 15 February; 06:05:37 | (United States) IM-1 Odysseus | Intuitive Machines | TLI to lunar surface | Lunar lander | 22 February; 23:23 | Operational |
| 15 February; 06:05:37 | ⚀ (United States) EagleCam | ERAU | TLI to lunar surface | Space selfie / Education | 22 February; 23:23 | Partial failure |
| 15 February; 06:05:37 | First Nova-C mission, part of the Commercial Lunar Payload Services (CLPS) program. 300th Falcon 9 launch. For the first time since Apollo 17 in 1972, LC-39A returns to supporting Lunar missions. | | | | | |
| 15 February; 21:34 | (United States) Falcon 9 Block 5 | Starlink Group 7-14 | (United States) Vandenberg SLC-4E | | (United States) SpaceX | |
| 15 February; 21:34 | (United States) Starlink × 22 | SpaceX | Low Earth | Communications | In orbit | Operational |
| 15 February; 21:34 | 300th Successful Falcon 9 launch. | | | | | |
| 17 February; 00:22:55 | (Japan) H3-22S | TF2 | (Japan) Tanegashima LA-Y2 | | (Japan) JAXA | |
| 17 February; 00:22:55 | (Japan) VEP-4 | JAXA | Low Earth to Suborbital | Launch vehicle evaluation | 17 February | Successful |
| 17 February; 00:22:55 | (Japan) CE-SAT-IE | Canon Electronics | Low Earth (SSO) | Earth observation | In orbit | Operational |
| 17 February; 00:22:55 | ⚀ (Japan) TIRSAT | Seiren Co. | Low Earth (SSO) | Earth observation | In orbit | Operational |
| 17 February; 00:22:55 | Changed from the originally manifested ALOS-4 due to the launch failure of H3-TF1 / ALOS-3. First successful flight of the H3 launch vehicle. Separation of VEP-4 was performed after the deorbit burn of the second stage. | | | | | |
| 17 February; 12:05 | (India) GSLV Mk II | F14 | (India) Satish Dhawan SLP | | (India) ISRO | |
| 17 February; 12:05 | (India) INSAT-3DS | ISRO | Geosynchronous | Meteorology | In orbit | Operational |
| 17 February; 12:05 | The satellite will be a follow-up to INSAT-3DR Mission. | | | | | |
| 18 February; 14:52 | (United States) Electron | "On Closer Inspection" | (New Zealand) Mahia LC-1B | | (United States) Rocket Lab | |
| 18 February; 14:52 | (Japan) ADRAS-J | Astroscale / JAXA | Low Earth | Space debris removal | In orbit | Operational |
| 18 February; 14:52 | ADRAS-J completed a rendezvous with a spent Japanese H-IIA upper stage rocket body in low Earth orbit. | | | | | |
| 20 February; 20:11 | (United States) Falcon 9 Block 5 | F9-301 | (United States) Cape Canaveral SLC-40 | | (United States) SpaceX | |
| 20 February; 20:11 | (Indonesia) Telkomsat Merah Putih 2 (HTS 113BT) | Telkomsat | Geosynchronous | Communications | In orbit | Operational |
| 20 February; 20:11 | Replacement for Nusantara-2 / Nusantara Dua (Palapa-N1), which was lost in a launch failure in April 2020. | | | | | |
| 23 February; 04:11:50 | (United States) Falcon 9 Block 5 | Starlink Group 7-15 | (United States) Vandenberg SLC-4E | | (United States) SpaceX | |
| 23 February; 04:11:50 | (United States) Starlink × 22 | SpaceX | Low Earth | Communications | In orbit | Operational |
| 23 February; 11:30 | (China) Long March 5 | Y7 | (China) Wenchang LC-1 | | (China) CASC | |
| 23 February; 11:30 | (China) TJS-11 | CAST | Geosynchronous | SIGINT | In orbit | Operational |
| 25 February; 22:06 | (United States) Falcon 9 Block 5 | Starlink Group 6-39 | (United States) Cape Canaveral SLC-40 | | (United States) SpaceX | |
| 25 February; 22:06 | (United States) Starlink × 24 | SpaceX | Low Earth | Communications | In orbit | Operational |
| 29 February; 05:43:26 | (Russia) Soyuz-2.1b / Fregat-M | | (Russia) Vostochny Site 1S | | (Russia) Roscosmos | |
| 29 February; 05:43:26 | (Russia) Meteor-M №2-4 | Roscosmos | Low Earth (SSO) | Meteorology | In orbit | Operational |
| 29 February; 05:43:26 | (Russia) Marafon-D-GVM | Roscosmos | Low Earth (SSO) | Dummy Payload | In orbit | Operational |
| 29 February; 05:43:26 | (Iran) Pars 1 | ISA | Low Earth (SSO) | Earth observation | In orbit | Operational |
| 29 February; 05:43:26 | ⚀ (Russia) SITRO-AIS × 16 | Sitronics Group | Low Earth (SSO) | AIS ship tracking | In orbit | Operational |
| 29 February; 05:43:26 | ⚀ (Russia) Zorkiy-2M-2 | Sputnix | Low Earth (SSO) | Earth observation | In orbit | Operational |
| 29 February; 05:43:26 | GK Launch Services commercial rideshare mission. | | | | | |
| 29 February; 13:03 | (China) Long March 3B/E | 3B-Y95 | (China) Xichang LC-2 | | (China) CASC | |
| 29 February; 13:03 | (China) Weixing Hulianwang Gaogui-01 | APT Satellite Holdings / CAST | Geosynchronous | Communications | In orbit | Operational |
| 29 February; 13:03 | It is Part of the Guowang (Xingwang) constellation. | | | | | |
| 29 February; 15:30 | (United States) Falcon 9 Block 5 | Starlink Group 6-40 | (United States) Cape Canaveral SLC-40 | | (United States) SpaceX | |
| 29 February; 15:30 | (United States) Starlink × 23 | SpaceX | Low Earth | Communications | In orbit | Operational |

- ← Jan
- Feb
- Mar
- Apr
- May
- Jun
- Jul
- Aug
- Sep
- Oct
- Nov
- Dec →

=== March ===
| Date and time (UTC) | Rocket | Flight number | Launch site | | LSP | |
| Date and time (UTC) | Payload (⚀ = CubeSat) | Operator | Orbit | Function | Decay (UTC) | Outcome |
| Date and time (UTC) | Remarks | | | | | |
|---|---|---|---|---|---|---|
| 4 March; 03:53:38 | (United States) Falcon 9 Block 5 | F9-305 | (United States) Kennedy LC-39A | | (United States) SpaceX | |
| 4 March; 03:53:38 | (United States) SpaceX Crew-8 | SpaceX / NASA | Low Earth (ISS) | Expedition 70/71 | 25 October; 07:29:02 | Successful |
| 4 March; 03:53:38 | Eighth operational Crew Dragon mission to the ISS. | | | | | |
| 4 March; 22:05 | (United States) Falcon 9 Block 5 | Transporter-10 | (United States) Vandenberg SLC-4E | | (United States) SpaceX | |
| 4 March; 22:05 | (Australia) Optimus-2 | Space Machines Company | Low Earth (SSO) | Space tug | In orbit | Operational |
| 4 March; 22:05 | (United States) Aries | Apex | Low Earth (SSO) | Payload hosting | In orbit | Operational |
| 4 March; 22:05 | (Belgium) Fifi | Aerospacelab | Low Earth (SSO) | Earth observation | In orbit | Operational |
| 4 March; 22:05 | (United States) GHOSt-4 | Orbital Sidekick | Low Earth (SSO) | Earth observation | In orbit | Operational |
| 4 March; 22:05 | (United States) GHOSt-5 | Orbital Sidekick | Low Earth (SSO) | Earth observation | In orbit | Operational |
| 4 March; 22:05 | (United States) Gluon | Atomos Space | Low Earth (SSO) | Space docking | In orbit | Operational |
| 4 March; 22:05 | (Finland) ICEYE × 3 | ICEYE | Low Earth (SSO) | Earth observation | X37: 7 March 2025 | Operational (2 of 3) |
| 4 March; 22:05 | (United States) Jackal × 2 | True Anomaly | Low Earth (SSO) | Technology demonstration | In orbit | Operational |
| 4 March; 22:05 | (United States) LizzieSat-1 | Sidus Space | Low Earth (SSO) | Technology demonstration | In orbit | Operational |
| 4 March; 22:05 | (Belgium) Loulou, Riri, Rose | Aerospacelab | Low Earth (SSO) | SIGINT | In orbit | Operational |
| 4 March; 22:05 | (United States) Lynk Tower 05 | Lynk Global | Low Earth (SSO) | Communications | In orbit | Operational |
| 4 March; 22:05 | (United States) Lynk Tower 06 | Lynk Global | Low Earth (SSO) | Communications | In orbit | Operational |
| 4 March; 22:05 | (United States) (New Zealand) MethaneSAT | EDF / NZSA | Low Earth (SSO) | Earth observation of atmospheric methane | In orbit | Spacecraft failure |
| 4 March; 22:05 | (United States) MuSat-2 | Muon Space | Low Earth (SSO) | Technology demonstration | In orbit | Operational |
| 4 March; 22:05 | (Argentina) ÑuSat 44 | Satellogic | Low Earth (SSO) | Earth observation | In orbit | Operational |
| 4 March; 22:05 | (Japan) Pyxis | Axelspace | Low Earth (SSO) | Technology demonstration | In orbit | Spacecraft failure |
| 4 March; 22:05 | (United States) Quark | Atomos Space | Low Earth (SSO) | Space docking | In orbit | Operational |
| 4 March; 22:05 | (United States) YAM-6 | Loft Orbital | Low Earth (SSO) | Payload hosting | In orbit | Operational |
| 4 March; 22:05 | ⚀ (Portugal) AEROS MH-1 | CEiiA / Thales Edisoft | Low Earth (SSO) | Earth observation | 15 April 2025 | Successful |
| 4 March; 22:05 | ⚀ (France) BRO-12 | UnseenLabs | Low Earth (SSO) | SIGINT | In orbit | Operational |
| 4 March; 22:05 | ⚀ (France) BRO-13 | UnseenLabs | Low Earth (SSO) | SIGINT | In orbit | Operational |
| 4 March; 22:05 | ⚀ (South Korea) ContecSat-1 | CONTEC | Low Earth (SSO) | Earth observation | In orbit | Operational |
| 4 March; 22:05 | ⚀ (United States) EWS-RROCI 2 | SSC | Low Earth (SSO) | Technology demonstration | In orbit | Operational |
| 4 March; 22:05 | ⚀ (Spain) HORACIO | Satlantis | Low Earth (SSO) | Earth observation | In orbit | Operational |
| 4 March; 22:05 | ⚀ (United Kingdom) IOD-6 Hammer | Open Cosmos | Low Earth (SSO) | Earth observation | In orbit | Operational |
| 4 March; 22:05 | ⚀ (Taiwan) IRIS-F1 | NCKU / Satoro | Low Earth (SSO) | AIS ship tracking | 28 December 2025 | Successful |
| 4 March; 22:05 | ⚀ (United States) LACE-A | NWIC Pacific / MDA | Low Earth (SSO) | Technology demonstration | 22 May 2025 | Successful |
| 4 March; 22:05 | ⚀ (United States) LACE-B | NWIC Pacific / MDA | Low Earth (SSO) | Technology demonstration | 4 June 2025 | Successful |
| 4 March; 22:05 | ⚀ (United States) Lemur-2 × 4 | Spire Global | Low Earth (SSO) | Earth observation | First: 14 December 2024; Last: 21 January 2026 | Operational (1 of 4) |
| 4 March; 22:05 | ⚀ (United States) M3 | Missouri S&T | Low Earth (SSO) | Technology demonstration | In orbit | Operational |
| 4 March; 22:05 | ⚀ (United Kingdom) OrbAstro-TR2 | OrbAstro | Low Earth (SSO) | Technology demonstration | In orbit | Operational |
| 4 March; 22:05 | ⚀ (Mongolia) OWLSAT-1 | ONDO Space | Low Earth (SSO) | Amateur radio | In orbit | Operational |
| 4 March; 22:05 | ⚀ (Mongolia) OWLSAT-2 | ONDO Space | Low Earth (SSO) | Amateur radio | 24 December 2025 | Successful |
| 4 March; 22:05 | ⚀ (United States) Pony Express 2A | Tyvak | Low Earth (SSO) | Technology demonstration | In orbit | Operational |
| 4 March; 22:05 | ⚀ (United States) Pony Express 2B | Tyvak | Low Earth (SSO) | Technology demonstration | In orbit | Operational |
| 4 March; 22:05 | ⚀ (United States) PY4 × 4 | NASA | Low Earth (SSO) | Technology demonstration | First: 24 December 2024; Last: 3 January 2025 | Operational (1 of 4) |
| 4 March; 22:05 | ⚀ (United States) RROCI-2 | NOAA / Orion Space Solutions | Low Earth (SSO) | Earth observation | In orbit | Operational |
| 4 March; 22:05 | ⚀ (United States) Scout-1 | Quantum Space | Low Earth (SSO) | Space domain awareness | 25 March 2026 | Successful |
| 4 March; 22:05 | ⚀ (Germany) SONATE-2 | University of Würzburg | Low Earth (SSO) | Technology demonstration | In orbit | Operational |
| 4 March; 22:05 | ⚀ (Luxembourg) Tiger-7 | OQ Technology | Low Earth (SSO) | IoT | In orbit | Operational |
| 4 March; 22:05 | ⚀ (Luxembourg) Tiger-8 | OQ Technology | Low Earth (SSO) | IoT | In orbit | Operational |
| 4 March; 22:05 | ⚀ (United States) Veery-0E | Care Weather Technologies | Low Earth (SSO) | Meteorology | In orbit | Operational |
| 4 March; 22:05 | Dedicated SmallSat Rideshare mission to Sun-synchronous orbit, designated Transporter-10. Atomos Space's Gluon and Quark will perform in-orbit rendezvous, docking and refueling. The ELaNa 57 mission, consisting of the M3 cubesat, was launched on this flight. | | | | | |
| 4 March; 23:56 | (United States) Falcon 9 Block 5 | Starlink Group 6-41 | (United States) Cape Canaveral SLC-40 | | (United States) SpaceX | |
| 4 March; 23:56 | (United States) Starlink × 23 | SpaceX | Low Earth | Communications | In orbit | Operational |
| 10 March; 23:05 | (United States) Falcon 9 Block 5 | Starlink Group 6-43 | (United States) Cape Canaveral SLC-40 | | (United States) SpaceX | |
| 10 March; 23:05 | (United States) Starlink × 23 | SpaceX | Low Earth | Communications | In orbit | Operational |
| 11 March; 04:09 | (United States) Falcon 9 Block 5 | Starlink Group 7-17 | (United States) Vandenberg SLC-4E | | (United States) SpaceX | |
| 11 March; 04:09 | (United States) Starlink × 23 | SpaceX | Low Earth | Communications | In orbit | Operational |
| 12 March; 15:03 | (United States) Electron | "Owl Night Long" | (New Zealand) Mahia LC-1B | | (United States) Rocket Lab | |
| 12 March; 15:03 | (Japan) StriX-3 | Synspective | Low Earth (SSO) | Earth observation | In orbit | Operational |
| 12 March; 15:03 | Fourth of 16 dedicated launches for Synspective's StriX constellation. | | | | | |
| 13 March; 02:01:12 | (Japan) KAIROS | | (Japan) Spaceport Kii | | (Japan) Space One | |
| 13 March; 02:01:12 | (Japan) CSICE Quick Response Satellite (Rapid Launch Small Satellite) | CSICE | Low Earth | Technology demonstration | 13 March; 02:01:17 | Launch failure |
| 13 March; 02:01:12 | Maiden flight of the KAIROS launch vehicle. The rocket exploded shortly after liftoff. | | | | | |
| 13 March; 12:51 | (China) Long March 2C / YZ-1S | 2C-Y86 | (China) Xichang LC-3 | | (China) CASC | |
| 13 March; 12:51 | (China) DRO-A | CAS | LEO to Selenocentric (DRO) | Technology demonstration | In orbit | Operational |
| 13 March; 12:51 | (China) DRO-B | CAS | LEO to Selenocentric (DRO) | Technology demonstration | In orbit | Operational |
| 13 March; 12:51 | The mission was a partial failure due to a problem in the YZ-1S upper stage during the flight, that prevented the satellites from accurately entering the intended orbit. Tracking data appears to show China is attempting to salvage spacecraft initially intended for the moon but left stranded by a rocket stage malfunction. They appear to have succeeded in reaching their desired orbit. As of 2025, the mission has successfully entered the planned DRO orbit by using gravity assist from Earth and Moon and completed its planned mission and is operational. | | | | | |
| 16 March; 00:21:00 | (United States) Falcon 9 Block 5 | Starlink Group 6-44 | (United States) Kennedy LC-39A | | (United States) SpaceX | |
| 16 March; 00:21:00 | (United States) Starlink × 23 | SpaceX | Low Earth | Communications | In orbit | Operational |
| 19 March; 02:28:00 | (United States) Falcon 9 Block 5 | Starlink Group 7-16 | (United States) Vandenberg SLC-4E | | (United States) SpaceX | |
| 19 March; 02:28:00 | (United States) Starlink × 20 | SpaceX | Low Earth | Communications | In orbit | Operational |
| 19 March; 02:28:00 | (United States) USA-350 | TBA | Low Earth | Communications | In orbit | Operational |
| 19 March; 02:28:00 | (United States) USA-351 | TBA | Low Earth | Communications | In orbit | Operational |
| 19 March; 02:28:00 | Carried two Starshield satellites as rideshare. | | | | | |
| 20 March; 00:31:28 | (China) Long March 8 | Y3 | (China) Wenchang LC-2 | | (China) CASC | |
| 20 March; 00:31:28 | (China) Queqiao-2 | CNSA | Selenocentric | Communications | In orbit | Operational |
| 20 March; 00:31:28 | (China) Tiandu-1 | Deep Space Exploration Laboratory | Selenocentric | Technology demonstration | In orbit | Operational |
| 20 March; 00:31:28 | (China) Tiandu-2 | Deep Space Exploration Laboratory | Selenocentric | Technology demonstration | In orbit | Operational |
| 20 March; 00:31:28 | Queqiao-2 will relay communications for the Chang'e 6 (Far side of the Moon), Chang'e 7 and Chang'e 8 (Lunar south pole region) spacecraft. Tiandu 1 and 2 will test technologies for a future lunar navigation and positioning constellation. | | | | | |
| 21 March; 05:27 | (China) Long March 2D / YZ-3 | 2D-Y87 | (China) Jiuquan SLS-2 | | (China) CASC | |
| 21 March; 05:27 | (China) Yunhai-2 × 6 (07-12) | CAST | Low Earth | Meteorology | In orbit | Operational |
| 21 March; 07:25 | (United States) Electron | "Live And Let Fly" | (United States) MARS LC-2 | | (United States) Rocket Lab | |
| 21 March; 07:25 | (United States) RASR-5 (USA-352) | NRO | Low Earth | Technology demonstration | In orbit | Operational |
| 21 March; 07:25 | ⚀ (United States) Aerocube 16A | The Aerospace Corporation | Low Earth | Technology demonstration | In orbit | Operational |
| 21 March; 07:25 | ⚀ (United States) Aerocube 16B | The Aerospace Corporation | Low Earth | Technology demonstration | In orbit | Operational |
| 21 March; 07:25 | ⚀ (United States) Mola | Naval Postgraduate School | Low Earth | Technology demonstration | In orbit | Operational |
| 21 March; 07:25 | NROL-123 mission. Last Satellite launch under NRO's Rapid Acquisition of a Small Rocket (RASR) program. First NRO launch on an Electron from Wallops, VA. | | | | | |
| 21 March; 20:55:09 | (United States) Falcon 9 Block 5 | F9-312 | (United States) Cape Canaveral SLC-40 | | (United States) SpaceX | |
| 21 March; 20:55:09 | (United States) SpaceX CRS-30 | NASA | Low Earth (ISS) | ISS logistics | 30 April; 05:38 | Successful |
| 21 March; 20:55:09 | ⚀ (United States) Big Red Sat-1 | UN Lincoln | Low Earth | Technology demonstration | In orbit | Operational |
| 21 March; 20:55:09 | ⚀ (United States) BurstCube | NASA Goddard | Low Earth | Gamma-ray burst study | In orbit | Operational |
| 21 March; 20:55:09 | ⚀ (Japan) CURTIS | Panasonic Holdings | Low Earth | Technology demonstration | In orbit | Operational |
| 21 March; 20:55:09 | ⚀ (United States) HyTi | UH Mānoa | Low Earth | Technology demonstration | In orbit | Operational |
| 21 March; 20:55:09 | ⚀ (Japan) KASHIWA | Chiba Institute of Technology | Low Earth | Technology demonstration | 11 August | Successful |
| 21 March; 20:55:09 | ⚀ (Canada) Killick 1 | Memorial University | Low Earth | Oceanography | In orbit | Operational |
| 21 March; 20:55:09 | ⚀ (Japan) MicroOrbiter-1 | Micro Orbiter Inc. | Low Earth | Technology demonstration | In orbit | Operational |
| 21 March; 20:55:09 | ⚀ (Canada) QMSat | Université de Sherbrooke | Low Earth | Technology demonstration | In orbit | Operational |
| 21 March; 20:55:09 | ⚀ (United States) SNoOPI | Purdue University | Low Earth | Technology demonstration | In orbit | Operational |
| 21 March; 20:55:09 | ⚀ (Canada) VIOLET | University of New Brunswick | Low Earth | Space weather | In orbit | Operational |
| 21 March; 20:55:09 | The ELaNa-51 mission, consisting of 4 cubesats, was launched on this flight. This was the tenth flight for SpaceX under NASA's CRS Phase 2 and first Dragon 2 launch from SLC-40, as the pad was reconfigured and a new Crew Access Tower and Arm was added. CURTIS, KASHIWA, and MicroOrbiter-1 were deployed into orbit from ISS on 11 April 2024. SNoOPI, BurstCube, HyTI, Killick-1, QMSat, VIOLET, and Big Red Sat-1 were deployed into orbit from the ISS on 18 April 2024. | | | | | |
| 23 March; 12:36:10 | (Russia) Soyuz-2.1a | | (Kazakhstan) Baikonur Site 31/6 | | (Russia) Roscosmos | |
| 23 March; 12:36:10 | (Russia) Soyuz MS-25 | Roscosmos | Low Earth (ISS) | Expedition 70/71 | 23 September; 11:58:16 | Successful |
| 24 March; 03:09 | (United States) Falcon 9 Block 5 | Starlink Group 6-42 | (United States) Kennedy LC-39A | | (United States) SpaceX | |
| 24 March; 03:09 | (United States) Starlink × 23 | SpaceX | Low Earth | Communications | In orbit | Operational |
| 25 March; 23:42 | (United States) Falcon 9 Block 5 | Starlink Group 6-46 | (United States) Cape Canaveral SLC-40 | | (United States) SpaceX | |
| 25 March; 23:42 | (United States) Starlink × 23 | SpaceX | Low Earth | Communications | In orbit | Operational |
| 26 March; 22:51 | (China) Long March 6A | 6A-Y3 | (China) Taiyuan LA-9A | | (China) CASC | |
| 26 March; 22:51 | (China) Yunhai-3 02 | SAST | Low Earth (SSO) | Meteorology | In orbit | Operational |
| 30 March; 21:52 | (United States) Falcon 9 Block 5 | F9-315 | (United States) Kennedy LC-39A | | (United States) SpaceX | |
| 30 March; 21:52 | (France) Eutelsat 36D | Eutelsat | Geosynchronous | Communications | In orbit | Operational |
| 30 March; 21:52 | Replacement for Eutelsat 36B. | | | | | |
| 31 March; 01:30 | (United States) Falcon 9 Block 5 | Starlink Group 6-45 | (United States) Cape Canaveral SLC-40 | | (United States) SpaceX | |
| 31 March; 01:30 | (United States) Starlink × 23 | SpaceX | Low Earth | Communications | In orbit | Operational |
| 31 March; 09:36:45 | (Russia) Soyuz-2.1b | | (Kazakhstan) Baikonur Site 31/6 | | (Russia) Roscosmos | |
| 31 March; 09:36:45 | (Russia) Resurs-P №4 | Roscosmos | Low Earth (SSO) | Earth observation | In orbit | Operational |
| 31 March; 09:36:45 | Replacement satellite for the Resurs-DK No.1 satellite. | | | | | |

- ← Jan
- Feb
- Mar
- Apr
- May
- Jun
- Jul
- Aug
- Sep
- Oct
- Nov
- Dec →

=== April ===
| Date and time (UTC) | Rocket | Flight number | Launch site | | LSP | |
| Date and time (UTC) | Payload (⚀ = CubeSat) | Operator | Orbit | Function | Decay (UTC) | Outcome |
| Date and time (UTC) | Remarks | | | | | |
|---|---|---|---|---|---|---|
| 2 April; 02:30:00 | (United States) Falcon 9 Block 5 | Starlink Group 7-18 | (United States) Vandenberg SLC-4E | | (United States) SpaceX | |
| 2 April; 02:30:00 | (United States) Starlink × 22 | SpaceX | Low Earth | Communications | In orbit | Operational |
| 2 April; 02:30:00 | Last launch of Starlink Group 7 Satellites. | | | | | |
| 2 April; 22:56 | (China) Long March 2D | 2D-Y102 | (China) Xichang LC-3 | | (China) CASC | |
| 2 April; 22:56 | (China) Yaogan 42-01 | SAST | Low Earth | Earth observation | In orbit | Operational |
| 5 April; 09:12:00 | (United States) Falcon 9 Block 5 | Starlink Group 6-47 | (United States) Cape Canaveral SLC-40 | | (United States) SpaceX | |
| 5 April; 09:12:00 | (United States) Starlink × 23 | SpaceX | Low Earth | Communications | In orbit | Operational |
| 7 April; 02:25:00 | (United States) Falcon 9 Block 5 | Starlink Group 8-1 | (United States) Vandenberg SLC-4E | | (United States) SpaceX | |
| 7 April; 02:25:00 | (United States) Starlink × 15 | SpaceX | Low Earth | Communications | In orbit | Operational |
| 7 April; 02:25:00 | (United States) Starlink-D2C × 6 | SpaceX | Low Earth | Communications | In orbit | Operational |
| 7 April; 02:25:00 | First launch of Starlink Group 8 Satellites from Vandenberg. | | | | | |
| 7 April; 23:16 | (United States) Falcon 9 Block 5 | Bandwagon-1 | (United States) Kennedy LC-39A | | (United States) SpaceX | |
| 7 April; 23:16 | (South Korea) KORSAT-1 (425 Project SAR Sat 1) | DAPA | Low Earth | SAR Reconnaissance | In orbit | Operational |
| 7 April; 23:16 | (United States) Acadia-4 (Capella-14) | Capella Space | Low Earth | Earth observation | In orbit | Operational |
| 7 April; 23:16 | (United States) Hawk 8A, 8B, 8C | HawkEye 360 | Low Earth | SIGINT | In orbit | Operational |
| 7 April; 23:16 | (United States) Hawk 9A, 9B, 9C | HawkEye 360 | Low Earth | SIGINT | In orbit | Operational |
| 7 April; 23:16 | (Japan) QPS-SAR 7 (TSUKUYOMI-II) | iQPS | Low Earth | Earth Observation | In orbit | Operational |
| 7 April; 23:16 | (India) TSAT-1A | TASL | Low Earth | Earth observation | In orbit | Operational |
| 7 April; 23:16 | ⚀ (Australia) Centauri-6 | Fleet Space | Low Earth | IoT | In orbit | Operational |
| 7 April; 23:16 | Dedicated SmallSat Rideshare mission to a 45-degree mid-inclination orbit, designated Bandwagon-1. Second of five launches for DAPA 425 Project (425 Project Flight 2). | | | | | |
| 9 April; 16:53 | (United States) Delta IV Heavy | D-389 | (United States) Cape Canaveral SLC-37B | | (United States) ULA | |
| 9 April; 16:53 | (United States) USA-353 (Orion 12/Mentor 10) | NRO | Geosynchronous | Reconnaissance (SIGINT) | In orbit | Operational |
| 9 April; 16:53 | NROL-70 Mission. Final Delta IV Heavy launch, and final launch of the Delta rocket family. | | | | | |
| 10 April; 05:40:00 | (United States) Falcon 9 Block 5 | Starlink Group 6-48 | (United States) Cape Canaveral SLC-40 | | (United States) SpaceX | |
| 10 April; 05:40:00 | (United States) Starlink × 23 | SpaceX | Low Earth | Communications | In orbit | Operational |
| 11 April; 09:00:00 | (Russia) Angara A5 / Orion | | (Russia) Vostochny Site 1A | | (Russia) Roscosmos | |
| 11 April; 09:00:00 | (Russia) GMM-KA | Roscosmos | Geosynchronous | Launch Vehicle Evaluation | In orbit | Successful |
| 11 April; 09:00:00 | ⚀ (Russia) Gagarinets | Avant Space | Low Earth | Technology demonstration | 20 April | Successful |
| 11 April; 09:00:00 | ⚀ (Russia) Mass simulator | Roscosmos | Low Earth | Dummy payload | In orbit | Operational |
| 11 April; 09:00:00 | Maiden flight of Angara A5 / Orion combination. First launch of an Angara launch vehicle from Vostochny Cosmodrome (Vostochny Angara Test Flight). | | | | | |
| 11 April; 14:25 | (United States) Falcon 9 Block 5 | F9-322 | (United States) Vandenberg SLC-4E | | (United States) SpaceX | |
| 11 April; 14:25 | (United States) WSF-M 1 | United States Space Force | Low Earth (SSO) | Space weather | In orbit | Operational |
| 11 April; 14:25 | USSF-62 Mission. | | | | | |
| 13 April; 01:40:00 | (United States) Falcon 9 Block 5 | Starlink Group 6-49 | (United States) Cape Canaveral SLC-40 | | (United States) SpaceX | |
| 13 April; 01:40:00 | (United States) Starlink × 23 | SpaceX | Low Earth | Communications | In orbit | Operational |
| 13 April; 01:40:00 | First time a Falcon 9 booster (B1062) has flown 20 times. | | | | | |
| 15 April; 04:12 | (China) Long March 2D | 2D-Y97 | (China) Jiuquan SLS-2 | | (China) CASC | |
| 15 April; 04:12 | (China) Siwei Gaojing 3-01 (SuperView Neo 3-01) | China Siwei | Low Earth (SSO) | Earth observation | In orbit | Operational |
| 17 April; 21:26:00 | (United States) Falcon 9 Block 5 | Starlink Group 6-51 | (United States) Kennedy LC-39A | | (United States) SpaceX | |
| 17 April; 21:26:00 | (United States) Starlink × 23 | SpaceX | Low Earth | Communications | In orbit | Operational |
| 18 April; 22:40:00 | (United States) Falcon 9 Block 5 | Starlink Group 6-52 | (United States) Cape Canaveral SLC-40 | | (United States) SpaceX | |
| 18 April; 22:40:00 | (United States) Starlink × 23 | SpaceX | Low Earth | Communications | In orbit | Operational |
| 20 April; 23:45 | (China) Long March 2D | 2D-Y103 | (China) Xichang LC-3 | | (China) CASC | |
| 20 April; 23:45 | (China) Yaogan 42-02 | SAST | Low Earth | Earth observation | In orbit | Operational |
| 23 April; 22:17:00 | (United States) Falcon 9 Block 5 | Starlink Group 6-53 | (United States) Cape Canaveral SLC-40 | | (United States) SpaceX | |
| 23 April; 22:17:00 | (United States) Starlink × 23 | SpaceX | Low Earth | Communications | In orbit | Operational |
| 23 April; 22:32 | (United States) Electron | "Beginning Of The Swarm" | (New Zealand) Mahia LC-1B | | (United States) Rocket Lab | |
| 23 April; 22:32 | (South Korea) NeonSat-1 | KAIST | Low Earth (SSO) | Earth observation | In orbit | Operational |
| 23 April; 22:32 | ⚀ (United States) ACS3 | NASA | Low Earth (SSO) | Solar sail technology demonstration | In orbit | Operational |
| 23 April; 22:32 | Rideshare mission. | | | | | |
| 25 April; 12:59:00 | (China) Long March 2F/G | 2F-Y18 | (China) Jiuquan SLS-1 | | (China) CASC | |
| 25 April; 12:59:00 | (China) Shenzhou 18 | CMSA | Low Earth (TSS) | Crewed spaceflight | 3 November; 17:25 | Successful |
| 25 April; 12:59:00 | Seventh crewed flight to the Tiangong space station. | | | | | |
| 28 April; 00:34 | (United States) Falcon 9 Block 5 | F9-327 | (United States) Kennedy LC-39A | | (United States) SpaceX | |
| 28 April; 00:34 | Galileo FOC FM25 | ESA | Medium Earth | Navigation | In orbit | Operational |
| 28 April; 00:34 | Galileo FOC FM27 | ESA | Medium Earth | Navigation | In orbit | Operational |
| 28 April; 00:34 | First Galileo launch on a Falcon 9 and overall twelfth launch of Galileo satellites, carrying satellites Patrick and Julina. Originally planned to launch on Soyuz ST-B, but scrapped due to geopolitical factors. Then moved to Ariane 6, which was also scrapped due to delays. Europe contracted SpaceX to launch the two pairs aboard Falcon 9. Falcon 9 First stage Booster (B1060) was being expended in this mission. | | | | | |
| 28 April; 22:08:00 | (United States) Falcon 9 Block 5 | Starlink Group 6-54 | (United States) Cape Canaveral SLC-40 | | (United States) SpaceX | |
| 28 April; 22:08:00 | (United States) Starlink × 23 | SpaceX | Low Earth | Communications | In orbit | Operational |

- ← Jan
- Feb
- Mar
- Apr
- May
- Jun
- Jul
- Aug
- Sep
- Oct
- Nov
- Dec →

=== May ===
| Date and time (UTC) | Rocket | Flight number | Launch site | | LSP | |
| Date and time (UTC) | Payload (⚀ = CubeSat) | Operator | Orbit | Function | Decay (UTC) | Outcome |
| Date and time (UTC) | Remarks | | | | | |
|---|---|---|---|---|---|---|
| 2 May; 18:36 | (United States) Falcon 9 Block 5 | F9-329 | (United States) Vandenberg SLC-4E | | (United States) SpaceX | |
| 2 May; 18:36 | (United States) WorldView Legion 1 | Maxar Technologies | Low Earth (SSO) | Earth observation | In orbit | Operational |
| 2 May; 18:36 | (United States) WorldView Legion 2 | Maxar Technologies | Low Earth (SSO) | Earth observation | In orbit | Operational |
| 3 May; 02:37:00 | (United States) Falcon 9 Block 5 | Starlink Group 6-55 | (United States) Cape Canaveral SLC-40 | | (United States) SpaceX | |
| 3 May; 02:37:00 | (United States) Starlink × 23 | SpaceX | Low Earth | Communications | In orbit | Operational |
| 3 May; 09:27:29 | (China) Long March 5 | Y8 | (China) Wenchang LC-1 | | (China) CASC | |
| 3 May; 09:27:29 | (China) Chang'e 6 lander | CNSA | Selenocentric | Lunar lander | 1 June; 22:23 | Successful |
| 3 May; 09:27:29 | (China) Chang'e 6 ascent module | CNSA | Selenocentric | Space rendezvous | 6 June; 06:48 | Successful |
| 3 May; 09:27:29 | (China) Chang'e 6 orbiter | CNSA | Initial: Selenocentric; Current: Sun–Earth L_{2} | Lunar orbiter | In orbit | Operational |
| 3 May; 09:27:29 | (China) Chang'e 6 return capsule | CNSA | Selenocentric | Lunar sample return | 25 June; 06:07 | Successful |
| 3 May; 09:27:29 | (China) Jinchan | CNSA | TLI to lunar surface | Lunar rover | 1 June; 22:23 | Successful |
| 3 May; 09:27:29 | ⚀ (Pakistan) ICUBE-Q | SUPARCO | Selenocentric | Lunar Orbiter | In orbit | Operational |
| 3 May; 09:27:29 | China's second lunar sample return mission, and world's first from the far side of the Moon, targeting southern area of Apollo basin (~43º S, 154º W). The mission is expected to take 53 days from launch to return module touchdown. | | | | | |
| 6 May; 18:14 | (United States) Falcon 9 Block 5 | Starlink Group 6-57 | (United States) Cape Canaveral SLC-40 | | (United States) SpaceX | |
| 6 May; 18:14 | (United States) Starlink × 23 | SpaceX | Low Earth | Communications | In orbit | Operational |
| 7 May; 03:21:25 | (China) Long March 6C | 6C-Y1 | (China) Taiyuan LA-9A | | (China) CASC | |
| 7 May; 03:21:25 | (China) Haiwangxing 01 (Neptune 01) | SAST | Low Earth (SSO) | Earth observation | In orbit | Operational |
| 7 May; 03:21:25 | (China) Gaofen Shipin | Harbin Institute of Technology | Low Earth (SSO) | Earth observation | In orbit | Operational |
| 7 May; 03:21:25 | (China) Kuanfu Guangxue | Harbin Institute of Technology | Low Earth (SSO) | Earth observation | In orbit | Operational |
| 7 May; 03:21:25 | ⚀ (China) Zhixing-1C | Smart Satellite Technology | Low Earth (SSO) | Earth observation | In orbit | Operational |
| 7 May; 03:21:25 | First flight of the Long March 6C, a single-stick variant of Long March 6A. | | | | | |
| 8 May; 18:42 | (United States) Falcon 9 Block 5 | Starlink Group 6-56 | (United States) Kennedy LC-39A | | (United States) SpaceX | |
| 8 May; 18:42 | (United States) Starlink × 23 | SpaceX | Low Earth | Communications | In orbit | Operational |
| 9 May; 01:43 | (China) Long March 3B/E | 3B-Y96 | (China) Xichang LC-2 | | (China) CASC | |
| 9 May; 01:43 | (China) Zhihui Tianwang 1-01A (Smart Skynet 1-01A) | SAST / Tsinghua University | Medium Earth | Communications | In orbit | Operational |
| 9 May; 01:43 | (China) Zhihui Tianwang 1-01B (Smart Skynet 1-01B) | SAST / Tsinghua University | Medium Earth | Communications | In orbit | Operational |
| 10 May; 04:30 | (United States) Falcon 9 Block 5 | Starlink Group 8-2 | (United States) Vandenberg SLC-4E | | (United States) SpaceX | |
| 10 May; 04:30 | (United States) Starlink × 7 | SpaceX | Low Earth | Communications | In orbit | Operational |
| 10 May; 04:30 | (United States) Starlink-D2C × 13 | SpaceX | Low Earth | Communications | In orbit | Operational |
| 11 May; 23:43 | (China) Long March 4C | 4C-Y50 | (China) Jiuquan SLS-2 | | (China) CASC | |
| 11 May; 23:43 | (China) Shiyan 23 | SAST | Low Earth (SSO) | Technology demonstration | In orbit | Operational |
| 13 May; 00:53 | (United States) Falcon 9 Block 5 | Starlink Group 6-58 | (United States) Cape Canaveral SLC-40 | | (United States) SpaceX | |
| 13 May; 00:53 | (United States) Starlink × 23 | SpaceX | Low Earth | Communications | In orbit | Operational |
| 14 May; 18:39 | (United States) Falcon 9 Block 5 | Starlink Group 8-7 | (United States) Vandenberg SLC-4E | | (United States) SpaceX | |
| 14 May; 18:39 | (United States) Starlink × 7 | SpaceX | Low Earth | Communications | In orbit | Operational |
| 14 May; 18:39 | (United States) Starlink-D2C × 13 | SpaceX | Low Earth | Communications | In orbit | Operational |
| 16 May; 21:21:39 | (Russia) Soyuz-2.1b / Fregat-M | | (Russia) Plesetsk Site 43/4 | | (Russia) RVSN RF | |
| 16 May; 21:21:39 | (Russia) Nivelir-L №4 (Kosmos 2576) | VKS | Low Earth (SSO) | Space Surveillance | In orbit | Operational |
| 16 May; 21:21:39 | (Russia) Rassvet-2 × 3 | Bureau 1440 | Low Earth (SSO) | Communications | In orbit | Operational |
| 16 May; 21:21:39 | ⚀ (Russia) SITRO-AIS × 4 | Sitronics Group | Low Earth (SSO) | AIS ship tracking | In orbit | Operational |
| 16 May; 21:21:39 | ⚀ (Russia) Zorkiy-2M-4 | Sputnix | Low Earth (SSO) | Earth observation | In orbit | Operational |
| 16 May; 21:21:39 | ⚀ (Russia) Zorkiy-2M-6 | Sputnix | Low Earth (SSO) | Earth observation | In orbit | Operational |
| 16 May; 21:21:39 | GK Launch Services commercial rideshare mission. | | | | | |
| 18 May; 00:32 | (United States) Falcon 9 Block 5 | Starlink Group 6-59 | (United States) Cape Canaveral SLC-40 | | (United States) SpaceX | |
| 18 May; 00:32 | (United States) Starlink × 23 | SpaceX | Low Earth | Communications | In orbit | Operational |
| 20 May; 03:06 | (China) Long March 2D | 2D-Y98 | (China) Taiyuan LA-9 | | (China) CASC | |
| 20 May; 03:06 | (China) Beijing-3C × 4 | Twenty First Century Aerospace Technology Company Ltd | Low Earth (SSO) | Earth Observation | In orbit | Operational |
| 21 May; 04:15 | (China) Kuaizhou 11 | Y4 | (China) Jiuquan LS-95A | | (China) ExPace | |
| 21 May; 04:15 | (China) Luojia 3-02 (Wuhan-1) | Wuhan University | Low Earth (SSO) | Earth Observation | In orbit | Operational |
| 21 May; 04:15 | (China) Chaodigui Jishu Shiyan (VLEO test satellite, Chutian 01) | TBA | Low Earth (SSO) | Communications | In orbit | Operational |
| 21 May; 04:15 | (China) Lingque-3 01 | Beijing ZeroG Lab | Low Earth (SSO) | TBA | In orbit | Operational |
| 21 May; 04:15 | (China) Tianyan-22 | MinoSpace | Low Earth (SSO) | Earth observation | In orbit | Operational |
| 22 May; 08:00:20 | (United States) Falcon 9 Block 5 | F9-337 | (United States) Vandenberg SLC-4E | | (United States) SpaceX | |
| 22 May; 08:00:20 | (United States) USA-354 - USA-374 (Starshield Group 1-1) | NRO | Low Earth (SSO) | Reconnaissance | In orbit | Operational |
| 22 May; 08:00:20 | NROL-146 Mission (NRO's Proliferated Architecture Mission). First batch consisting of 21 SpaceX/Northrop built Starshield satellites for the National Reconnaissance Office. | | | | | |
| 23 May; 02:35 | (United States) Falcon 9 Block 5 | Starlink Group 6-62 | (United States) Cape Canaveral SLC-40 | | (United States) SpaceX | |
| 23 May; 02:35 | (United States) Starlink × 23 | SpaceX | Low Earth | Communications | In orbit | Operational |
| 24 May; 02:45 | (United States) Falcon 9 Block 5 | Starlink Group 6-63 | (United States) Kennedy LC-39A | | (United States) SpaceX | |
| 24 May; 02:45 | (United States) Starlink × 23 | SpaceX | Low Earth | Communications | In orbit | Operational |
| 25 May; 07:41 | (United States) Electron | "Ready, Aim, PREFIRE" | (New Zealand) Mahia LC-1B | | (United States) Rocket Lab | |
| 25 May; 07:41 | ⚀ (United States) PREFIRE 1 | NASA | Low Earth | Meteorology | In orbit | Operational |
| 25 May; 07:41 | First of two launches for NASA's PREFIRE mission. | | | | | |
| 27 May; 13:44 | (North Korea) (Russia) New-type satellite carrier rocket | | (North Korea) Sohae | | (North Korea) (Russia) NATA / Khrunichev | |
| 27 May; 13:44 | (North Korea) Malligyong-1-1 | NATA | Low Earth | Reconnaissance | 27 May; ~13:46 | Launch failure |
| 27 May; 13:44 | Launch of a "new-type satellite carrier rocket." Failed during first stage flight due to a "newly developed liquid oxygen + petroleum engine." Possibly a Russian Angara rocket using an RD-191 engine. | | | | | |
| 28 May; 14:24 | (United States) Falcon 9 Block 5 | Starlink Group 6-60 | (United States) Cape Canaveral SLC-40 | | (United States) SpaceX | |
| 28 May; 14:24 | (United States) Starlink × 23 | SpaceX | Low Earth | Communications | In orbit | Operational |
| 28 May; 22:20 | (United States) Falcon 9 Block 5 | F9-341 | (United States) Vandenberg SLC-4E | | (United States) SpaceX | |
| 28 May; 22:20 | (Japan) EarthCARE (Hakuryu) | ESA / JAXA | Low Earth (SSO) | Earth observation | In orbit | Operational |
| 28 May; 22:20 | Earth Explorer 6 of the Living Planet Programme. | | | | | |
| 29 May; 08:12 | (China) Ceres-1S | Y2 | (China) Dong Fang Hang Tian Gang platform, Yellow Sea | | (China) Galactic Energy | |
| 29 May; 08:12 | (China) Tianqi 25–28 | Guodian Gaoke | Low Earth | IoT | In orbit | Operational |
| 29 May; 08:12 | Mission designated "Beautiful World". | | | | | |
| 30 May; 09:42:59 | (Russia) Soyuz-2.1a | | (Kazakhstan) Baikonur Site 31/6 | | (Russia) Roscosmos | |
| 30 May; 09:42:59 | (Russia) Progress MS-27 / 88P | Roscosmos | Low Earth (ISS) | ISS logistics | 19 November; 16:43 | Successful |
| 30 May; 12:12:04 | (China) Long March 3B/E | 3B-Y96 | (China) Xichang LC-2 | | (China) CASC | |
| 30 May; 12:12:04 | (Pakistan) Paksat-MM1R | SUPARCO | Geosynchronous | Communications | In orbit | Operational |
| 30 May; 23:39 | (China) Ceres-1 | Y12 | (China) Jiuquan LS-95A | | (China) Galactic Energy | |
| 30 May; 23:39 | (China) Jiguang Xingzuo 01 | Aurora Starcom | Low Earth | Technology demonstration | In orbit | Operational |
| 30 May; 23:39 | (China) Jiguang Xingzuo 02 | Aurora Starcom | Low Earth | Technology demonstration | In orbit | Operational |
| 30 May; 23:39 | (China) Yunyao-1 14 (Hebei Linxi-1) | CGSTL | Low Earth | Meteorology | In orbit | Operational |
| 30 May; 23:39 | (China) Yunyao-1 25 (Zhangjiang Gaoke) | CGSTL | Low Earth | Meteorology | In orbit | Operational |
| 30 May; 23:39 | (China) Yunyao-1 26 (Nishuihan-2) | CGSTL | Low Earth | Meteorology | In orbit | Operational |
| 30 May; 23:39 | Mission designated "Heroes". | | | | | |

- ← Jan
- Feb
- Mar
- Apr
- May
- Jun
- Jul
- Aug
- Sep
- Oct
- Nov
- Dec →

=== June ===
| Date and time (UTC) | Rocket | Flight number | Launch site | | LSP | |
| Date and time (UTC) | Payload (⚀ = CubeSat) | Operator | Orbit | Function | Decay (UTC) | Outcome |
| Date and time (UTC) | Remarks | | | | | |
|---|---|---|---|---|---|---|
| 1 June; 02:37 | (United States) Falcon 9 Block 5 | Starlink Group 6-64 | (United States) Cape Canaveral SLC-40 | | (United States) SpaceX | |
| 1 June; 02:37 | (United States) Starlink × 23 | SpaceX | Low Earth | Communications | In orbit | Operational |
| 5 June; 02:16 | (United States) Falcon 9 Block 5 | Starlink Group 8-5 | (United States) Cape Canaveral SLC-40 | | (United States) SpaceX | |
| 5 June; 02:16 | (United States) Starlink × 7 | SpaceX | Low Earth | Communications | In orbit | Operational |
| 5 June; 02:16 | (United States) Starlink-D2C × 13 | SpaceX | Low Earth | Communications | In orbit | Operational |
| 5 June; 02:16 | First launch of Starlink Group 8 Satellites from Cape Canaveral. | | | | | |
| 5 June; 03:15 | (United States) Electron | "PREFIRE & Ice" | (New Zealand) Mahia LC-1B | | (United States) Rocket Lab | |
| 5 June; 03:15 | ⚀ (United States) PREFIRE 2 | NASA | Low Earth | Meteorology | In orbit | Operational |
| 5 June; 03:15 | Second of two launches for NASA's PREFIRE mission. | | | | | |
| 5 June; 14:52:15 | (United States) Atlas V N22 | AV-085 | (United States) Cape Canaveral SLC-41 | | (United States) ULA | |
| 5 June; 14:52:15 | (United States) Boe-CFT Calypso | Boeing / NASA | Low Earth (ISS) | Expedition 71 / Crewed flight test | 6 September; 22:04 | Successful |
| 5 June; 14:52:15 | Boeing Crewed Flight Test of Starliner, as part of the Commercial Crew Development program. 100th Atlas V Launch. First launch of humans from Cape Canaveral SFS since Apollo 7 in October 1968, first launch of humans on an Atlas vehicle since Gordon Cooper on Mercury-Atlas 9 on May 15, 1963 and the first launch of humans on an Atlas V. | | | | | |
| 6 June; 05:00:30 | (China) Ceres-1 | Y13 | (China) Jiuquan LS-95A | | (China) Galactic Energy | |
| 6 June; 05:00:30 | (China) Eros | Galactic Energy | Low Earth (SSO) | Space tug | In orbit | Operational |
| 6 June; 05:00:30 | (China) Naxing-3A | Tsinghua University | Low Earth (SSO) | Earth observation | In orbit | Operational |
| 6 June; 05:00:30 | (China) Naxing-3B | Tsinghua University | Low Earth (SSO) | Earth observation | In orbit | Operational |
| 6 June; 05:00:30 | (China) TEE-01B (Earth Eye 1) | Mumei Xingkong Keji | Low Earth (SSO) | Earth observation | In orbit | Operational |
| 6 June; 05:00:30 | Mission designated "Love On Top". | | | | | |
| 8 June; 01:56 | (United States) Falcon 9 Block 5 | Starlink Group 10-1 | (United States) Cape Canaveral SLC-40 | | (United States) SpaceX | |
| 8 June; 01:56 | (United States) Starlink × 22 | SpaceX | Low Earth | Communications | In orbit | Operational |
| 8 June; 01:56 | First launch of Starlink Group 10 Satellites. | | | | | |
| 8 June; 12:58 | (United States) Falcon 9 Block 5 | Starlink Group 8-8 | (United States) Vandenberg SLC-4E | | (United States) SpaceX | |
| 8 June; 12:58 | (United States) Starlink × 7 | SpaceX | Low Earth | Communications | In orbit | Operational |
| 8 June; 12:58 | (United States) Starlink-D2C × 13 | SpaceX | Low Earth | Communications | In orbit | Operational |
| 19 June; 03:40 | (United States) Falcon 9 Block 5 | Starlink Group 9-1 | (United States) Vandenberg SLC-4E | | (United States) SpaceX | |
| 19 June; 03:40 | (United States) Starlink × 7 | SpaceX | Low Earth | Communications | In orbit | Operational |
| 19 June; 03:40 | (United States) Starlink-D2C × 13 | SpaceX | Low Earth | Communications | In orbit | Operational |
| 19 June; 03:40 | First launch of Starlink Group 9 Satellites. | | | | | |
| 20 June; 18:13 | (United States) Electron | "No Time Toulouse" | (New Zealand) Mahia LC-1B | | (United States) Rocket Lab | |
| 20 June; 18:13 | ⚀ (France) Kinéis × 5 | Kinéis | Low Earth | IoT | In orbit | Operational |
| 20 June; 18:13 | First of five dedicated launches for Kinéis' IoT satellite constellation. 50th Electron launch. | | | | | |
| 20 June; 21:35 | (United States) Falcon 9 Block 5 | F9-347 | (United States) Cape Canaveral SLC-40 | | (United States) SpaceX | |
| 20 June; 21:35 | (Luxembourg) Astra 1P / SES-24 | SES S.A. | Geosynchronous | Communications | In orbit | Operational |
| 20 June; 21:35 | Astra 1P is also known as SES-24. The Falcon 9 upper stage has done a de-orbit burn for the first time while delivering payload to GTO. | | | | | |
| 22 June; 07:00 | (China) Long March 2C | 2C-Y50 | (China) Xichang LC-3 | | (China) CASC | |
| 22 June; 07:00 | (China) (France) SVOM | CNSA / CNES | Low Earth | Gamma-ray astronomy | In orbit | Operational |
| 22 June; 07:00 | (China) CATCH 1 | CNSA | Low Earth | X-ray astronomy | In orbit | Operational |
| 23 June; 17:25 | (United States) Falcon 9 Block 5 | Starlink Group 10-2 | (United States) Cape Canaveral SLC-40 | | (United States) SpaceX | |
| 23 June; 17:25 | (United States) Starlink × 22 | SpaceX | Low Earth | Communications | In orbit | Operational |
| 24 June; 03:47 | (United States) Falcon 9 Block 5 | Starlink Group 9-2 | (United States) Vandenberg SLC-4E | | (United States) SpaceX | |
| 24 June; 03:47 | (United States) Starlink × 7 | SpaceX | Low Earth | Communications | In orbit | Operational |
| 24 June; 03:47 | (United States) Starlink-D2C × 13 | SpaceX | Low Earth | Communications | In orbit | Operational |
| 25 June; 21:26 | (United States) Falcon Heavy | FH-010 | (United States) Kennedy LC-39A | | (United States) SpaceX | |
| 25 June; 21:26 | (United States) GOES-19 (GOES-U) | NOAA / NASA | Geosynchronous | Meteorology | In orbit | Operational |
| 25 June; 21:26 | GOES-U is the final Mission in the NASA's GOES Satellite Series. The Follow-on of GOES Satellite Series is GeoXO Missions. | | | | | |
| 27 June; 10:55 | (United States) Falcon 9 Block 5 | Starlink Group 10-3 | (United States) Cape Canaveral SLC-40 | | (United States) SpaceX | |
| 27 June; 10:55 | (United States) Starlink × 23 | SpaceX | Low Earth | Communications | In orbit | Operational |
| 29 June; 03:14 | (United States) Falcon 9 Block 5 | F9-351 | (United States) Vandenberg SLC-4E | | (United States) SpaceX | |
| 29 June; 03:14 | (United States) USA-375 - USA-395 (Starshield Group 1-2) | NRO | Low Earth (SSO) | Reconnaissance | In orbit | Operational |
| 29 June; 03:14 | NROL-186 Mission (NRO's Proliferated Architecture Mission). Second batch consisting of 21 SpaceX/Northrop built Starshield satellites for the National Reconnaissance Office. | | | | | |
| 29 June; 11:57 | (China) Long March 7A | 7A-Y8 | (China) Wenchang LC-2 | | (China) CASC | |
| 29 June; 11:57 | (China) ChinaSat 3A (Feng Huo 3A) | China Satcom | Geosynchronous | Communications | In orbit | Operational |
← Jan; Feb; Mar; Apr; May; Jun; Jul; Aug; Sep; Oct; Nov; Dec →
For flights after 30 June, see 2024 in spaceflight (July–December)

== Suborbital flights ==
| Date and time (UTC) | Rocket | Flight number | Launch site | | LSP | |
| Date and time (UTC) | Payload (⚀ = CubeSat) | Operator | Orbit | Function | Decay (UTC) | Outcome |
| Date and time (UTC) | Remarks | | | | | |
|---|---|---|---|---|---|---|
| 14 January | (North Korea) Hwasong-16A | | (North Korea) Chongdong | | (North Korea) KPA Strategic Force | |
| 14 January | (North Korea) | KPA Strategic Force | Suborbital | Missile test | 14 January | Successful |
| 14 January | Apogee: 100 km (62 mi). | | | | | |
| 26 January; 17:42:05 | (United States) SpaceShipTwo | Galactic 06 | (United States) Spaceport America | | (United States) Virgin Galactic | |
| 26 January; 17:42:05 | (United States) Galactic 06 | Virgin Galactic | Suborbital | Crewed spaceflight | 26 January; 17:56 | Successful |
| 26 January; 17:42:05 | Apogee: 88.8 km (55.2 mi). | | | | | |
| 30 January | (United States) UGM-133 Trident II | | (United Kingdom) HMS Vengeance, ETR | | (United Kingdom) Royal Navy | |
| 30 January | (United Kingdom) | Royal Navy | Suborbital | Missile test | 30 January | Launch failure |
| 30 January | Second consecutive failure of a UK-launched Trident missile. | | | | | |
| 7 February | (Netherlands) T-Minus DART | | (Sweden) Esrange | | (Netherlands) T-Minus Engineering | |
| 7 February | (Sweden) PRIME | KTH | Suborbital | Technology demonstration | 7 February | Partial failure |
| 7 February | First of two anticipated launches for the PRIME launch campaign. The payloads were deployed prematurely but still managed to gather some useful data. The second launch was not attempted. | | | | | |
| 8 February | (United States) MRBM-T2 | FTX-23 | (United States) Boeing C-17 Globemaster III, Pacific Ocean | | (United States) MDA | |
| 8 February | (United States) | MDA | Suborbital | Missile target | 8 February | Successful |
| 8 February | Flight Test Other-23 (FTX-23) test of the Aegis Ballistic Missile Defense System. SM-3 Block IIA target. | | | | | |
| 8 February | (United States) SM-3 Block IIA | FTX-23 | (United States) USS McCampbell, Pacific Ocean | | United States Navy | |
| 8 February | (United States) Kill vehicle | United States Navy | Suborbital | Interceptor | 8 February | Successful |
| 8 February | Flight Test Other-23 (FTX-23) test of the Aegis Ballistic Missile Defense System. Successful intercept. | | | | | |
| 15 February; 14:42:00 | (Brazil) VSB-30 | | (Sweden) Esrange | | (Germany) MORABA | |
| 15 February; 14:42:00 | (Germany) TEXUS-59 | DLR / ESA | Suborbital | Microgravity research | 15 February | Successful |
| 15 February; 14:42:00 | Apogee: 264.5 km (164.4 mi). | | | | | |
| 27 February; 07:27:00 | (Germany) Red Kite/Improved Malemute | MAPHEUS 14 | (Sweden) Esrange | | (Germany) MORABA | |
| 27 February; 07:27:00 | (Germany) MAPHEUS-14 | DLR | Suborbital | Microgravity research | 27 February | Successful |
| 27 February; 07:27:00 | Apogee: 265.2 km (164.8 mi). | | | | | |
| 1 March | (Russia) RS-24 Yars | | (Russia) Plesetsk Cosmodrome | | (Russia) Russian Ministry of Defence | |
| 1 March | (Russia) | Russian Ministry of Defence | Suborbital | ICBM test | 1 March | Successful |
| 1 March | Hit a target in the Kura Missile Test Range on the Kamchatka Peninsula, 6,700 km (4,163 mi) downrange. | | | | | |
| 11 March | (India) Agni-V | | (India) Integrated Test Range | | (India) Ministry of Defence | |
| 11 March | (India) | Ministry of Defence | Suborbital | Missile test | 11 March | Successful |
| 12 March; 05:15:00 | (United States) Improved Orion | | (Sweden) Esrange | | (Germany) (Sweden) DLR / SNSA | |
| 12 March; 05:15:00 | (Germany) (Sweden) REXUS-32 | DLR / SNSA | Suborbital | Education | 12 March | Successful |
| 12 March; 05:15:00 | Apogee: 75.9 km (47.2 mi). | | | | | |
| 14 March; 12:00:00 | (United States) Improved Orion | | (Sweden) Esrange | | (Germany) (Sweden) DLR / SNSA | |
| 14 March; 12:00:00 | (Germany) (Sweden) REXUS-31 | DLR / SNSA | Suborbital | Education | 14 March | Successful |
| 14 March; 12:00:00 | Apogee: 78.5 km (48.8 mi). | | | | | |
| 14 March; 13:25:00 | (United States) Starship | Flight 3 | (United States) Starbase OLP-A | | (United States) SpaceX | |
| 14 March; 13:25:00 | No payload | SpaceX | Suborbital (achieved); Transatmospheric (planned) | Flight test | 14 March; 14:14:35 | Successful |
| 14 March; 13:25:00 | Third Starship orbital test flight. The upper stage did not enter the planned transatmospheric orbit due to not performing a Raptor engine restart in space. The booster exploded at an altitude of 500 meters during a failed landing burn; Starship lost contact at ~65 km altitude during reentry. | | | | | |
| 17 March | (United States) AGM-183 ARRW | | (United States) Boeing B-52 Stratofortress | | United States Air Force | |
| 17 March | (United States) | United States Air Force | Suborbital | Missile test | 17 March | Successful |
| 24 March; 09:45:00 | (Brazil) VSB-30 | | (Sweden) Esrange | | (Germany) MORABA | |
| 24 March; 09:45:00 | (Germany) TEXUS-60 | DLR / ESA | Suborbital | Microgravity research | 24 March | Successful |
| 24 March; 09:45:00 | Apogee: 251.7 km (156.4 mi). | | | | | |
| 28 March | (United States) MRBM | FTM-32 | (United States) Pacific Missile Range Facility | | (United States) MDA | |
| 28 March | (United States) SM-6 target | MDA | Suborbital | ABM target | 28 March | Successful |
| 28 March | Flight Test Aegis Weapon System (FTM) 32, a test of the Aegis Ballistic Missile Defense System. MRBM target for two SM-6 Dual II missiles. Intercepted. | | | | | |
| 1 April; 21:52 | (North Korea) Hwasong-16B | | (North Korea) Chongdong | | (North Korea) KPA Strategic Force | |
| 1 April; 21:52 | (North Korea) | KPA Strategic Force | Suborbital | Missile test | 1 April | Successful |
| 1 April; 21:52 | Apogee: 101 km (63 mi). | | | | | |
| 8 April; 18:40 | (Canada) Black Brant IX | | (United States) Wallops Flight Facility | | (United States) NASA | |
| 8 April; 18:40 | (United States) APEP-2 | ERAU | Suborbital | Ionospheric research | 8 April | Successful |
| 8 April; 18:40 | First of three launches. | | | | | |
| 8 April; 19:25 | (Canada) Black Brant IX | | (United States) Wallops Flight Facility | | (United States) NASA | |
| 8 April; 19:25 | (United States) APEP-2 | ERAU | Suborbital | Ionospheric research | 8 April | Successful |
| 8 April; 19:25 | Second of three launches. | | | | | |
| 8 April; 20:28 | (Canada) Black Brant IX | | (United States) Wallops Flight Facility | | (United States) NASA | |
| 8 April; 20:28 | (United States) APEP-2 | ERAU | Suborbital | Ionospheric research | 8 April | Successful |
| 8 April; 20:28 | Last of three launches. | | | | | |
| 12 April; 16:00? | (Russia) Topol-ME | | (Russia) Kapustin Yar | | (Russia) RVSN | |
| 12 April; 16:00? | (Russia) | RVSN | Suborbital | Missile test | 12 April | Successful |
| 13 April | (Iran) Emad / Kheibar Shekan / Dezful / Ghadr-110 | | (Iran) | | (Iran) | |
| 13 April | (Iran) | (Iran) | Suborbital | Missile launch | 13 April | Intercepted |
| 13 April | Apogee roughly 300 kilometres (190 mi). About 120 missile launches. | | | | | |
| 13 April | (United States) SM-3 | | (United States) USS Arleigh Burke, Mediterranean Sea | | United States Navy | |
| 13 April | (United States) Kill vehicle | United States Navy | Suborbital | Interceptor | 13 April | Successful |
| 13 April | Successful intercept. (1 of 4) | | | | | |
| 13 April | (United States) SM-3 | | (United States) USS Arleigh Burke, Mediterranean Sea | | United States Navy | |
| 13 April | (United States) Kill vehicle | United States Navy | Suborbital | Interceptor | 13 April | Successful |
| 13 April | Successful intercept. (2 of 4) | | | | | |
| 13 April | (United States) SM-3 | | (United States) USS Carney, Mediterranean Sea | | United States Navy | |
| 13 April | (United States) Kill vehicle | United States Navy | Suborbital | Interceptor | 13 April | Successful |
| 13 April | Successful intercept. (3 of 4) | | | | | |
| 13 April | (United States) SM-3 | | (United States) USS Carney, Mediterranean Sea | | United States Navy | |
| 13 April | (United States) Kill vehicle | United States Navy | Suborbital | Interceptor | 13 April | Successful |
| 13 April | Successful intercept. (4 of 4) | | | | | |
| 17 April; 22:13 | (Canada) Black Brant IX | | (United States) Poker Flat Research Range | | (United States) NASA | |
| 17 April; 22:13 | (United States) FOXSI-4 | UMN | Suborbital | Solar X-ray astronomy | 17 April | Successful |
| 17 April; 22:13 | Fourth flight of the FOXSI Sounding Rocket payload. Apogee: 271 km (168 mi). | | | | | |
| 17 April; 22:14 | (Canada) Black Brant IX | | (United States) Poker Flat Research Range | | (United States) NASA | |
| 17 April; 22:14 | (United States) Hi-C Flare | Marshall Space Flight Center | Suborbital | Solar physics | 17 April | Successful |
| 17 April; 22:14 | Fourth flight of the High Resolution Coronal Imager (Hi-C). Apogee: 271 km (168 mi). | | | | | |
| 5 May; 03:32 | (Canada) Black Brant IX | | (United States) White Sands Missile Range | | (United States) NASA | |
| 5 May; 03:32 | (United States) CIBER-2 | Rochester Institute of Technology | Suborbital | EBL anisotropy | 5 May | Successful |
| 5 May; 03:32 | Third flight of the CIBER-2 experiment. | | | | | |
| 19 May; 13:30 | (United States) New Shepard | NS-25 | (United States) Corn Ranch | | (United States) Blue Origin | |
| 19 May; 13:30 | (United States) Blue Origin NS-25 | Blue Origin | Suborbital | Crewed spaceflight | 19 May | Successful |
| 19 May; 13:30 | Seventh crewed flight of New Shepard. Apogee: 107 km (66.49 mi). | | | | | |
| 25 May? | (United States) Long-Range Hypersonic Weapon | | (United States) Pacific Missile Range Facility | | United States Army / United States Navy | |
| 25 May? | (United States) Common-Hypersonic Glide Body (C-HGB) | United States Army / United States Navy | Suborbital | Missile test | 25 May? | Successful |
| 4 June; 07:56 | (United States) Minuteman III | GT-249GM | (United States) Vandenberg LF-10 | | (United States) AFGSC | |
| 4 June; 07:56 | (United States) | AFGSC | Suborbital | Test flight | 4 June | Successful |
| 4 June; 07:56 | Re-entered ~4,200 mi (6,800 km) downrange near Kwajalein Atoll. | | | | | |
| 6 June; 08:46 | (United States) Minuteman III | GT-250GM | (United States) Vandenberg LF-09 | | (United States) AFGSC | |
| 6 June; 08:46 | (United States) | AFGSC | Suborbital | Test flight | 6 June | Successful |
| 6 June; 08:46 | Re-entered ~4,200 mi (6,800 km) downrange near Kwajalein Atoll. | | | | | |
| 6 June; 12:50 | (United States) Starship | Flight 4 | (United States) Starbase OLP-A | | (United States) SpaceX | |
| 6 June; 12:50 | No payload | SpaceX | Suborbital | Flight test | 6 June; 13:56 | Successful |
| 6 June; 12:50 | Fourth Starship orbital test flight. Both Booster 11 and Starship 29 survived to their respective planned landing burn simulations and soft ocean splashdown. This was the first time a Starship spacecraft completed atmospheric entry from orbital velocity. | | | | | |
| 8 June; 15:26:30 | (United States) SpaceShipTwo | Galactic 07 | (United States) Spaceport America | | (United States) Virgin Galactic | |
| 8 June; 15:26:30 | (United States) Galactic 07 | Virgin Galactic | Suborbital | Crewed spaceflight | 8 June; 15:26 | Successful |
| 8 June; 15:26:30 | Apogee: 87.5 km (54.4 mi). Final flight of the VSS Unity. | | | | | |
| 12 June | (United States) Terrier-Terrier-Oriole | HTB-1 | (United States) Wallops Flight Facility | | (United States) NASA | |
| 12 June | (United States) | MDA | Suborbital | Technology demonstration | 12 June | Successful |
| 12 June | Flight of a Hypersonic Test Bed (HTB) vehicle to provide a common platform for hypersonic experiments and HTBSS (Hypersonic and Ballistic Tracking Space Sensor) target | | | | | |
| 18 June; 07:01 | (United States) Minotaur I | | (United States) Vandenberg TP-01 | | (United States) Northrop Grumman | |
| 18 June; 07:01 | (United States) Mk21A reentry vehicle | AFNWC | Suborbital | Technology demonstration | 18 June | Successful |
| 18 June; 07:01 | Reentry vehicle demonstration for the future LGM-35A Sentinel intercontinental ballistic missile. | | | | | |
| 20 June; 10:30:00 | (United States) Terrier-Improved Orion | | (United States) Wallops Flight Facility | | (United States) NASA | |
| 20 June; 10:30:00 | (United States) RockOn | Colorado Space Grant Consortium | Suborbital | Education | 20 June | Successful |
| 20 June; 10:30:00 | Apogee: 114 km (71 mi). | | | | | |
| 25 June; 20:30 | (North Korea) Hwasong-16 | | (North Korea) Chongdong | | (North Korea) KPA Strategic Force | |
| 25 June; 20:30 | (North Korea) | KPA Strategic Force | Suborbital | Missile test | 25 June | Successful |
| 25 June; 20:30 | MRIV Test Apogee: 100 km (62 mi). | | | | | |
| 30 June; 20:05 | (North Korea) Hwasong-11C-4.5 | | (North Korea) Jangyon | | (North Korea) KPA Strategic Force | |
| 30 June; 20:05 | (North Korea) | KPA Strategic Force | Suborbital | Missile test | 30 June | Successful |
| 30 June; 20:05 | Apogee: 100 km (62 mi). | | | | | |
| 30 June; 20:15 | (North Korea) Hwasong-11C? | | (North Korea) Jangyon | | (North Korea) KPA Strategic Force | |
| 30 June; 20:15 | (North Korea) | KPA Strategic Force | Suborbital | Missile test | 30 June | Successful |
| 30 June; 20:15 | Apogee: 100 km (62 mi). | | | | | |
