= MethaneSAT =

Space mission to study global methane emissions

- Mission type: Climatology
- Operator: Environmental Defense Fund; New Zealand Space Agency
- COSPAR ID: 2024-043D
- SATCAT no.: 59101
- Website: https://www.methanesat.org/

Spacecraft properties
- Spacecraft: MethaneSAT
- Bus: X-Sat
- Manufacturer: Blue Canyon Technologies
- Launch mass: 350 kg (770 lb)

Start of mission
- Launch date: March 4, 2024
- Rocket: Falcon 9 Block 5
- Launch site: Launch Complex 4E (SLC-4E) at Vandenberg Space Force Base in California
- Contractor: SpaceX

Orbital parameters
- Reference system: Geocentric orbit
- Regime: Sun-synchronous orbit

MethaneSAT was an American-New Zealand space mission in 2024–25. It was an Earth observation satellite that monitored and studied global methane emissions in order to combat climate change. The spacecraft carried a high performance spectrometer methane sensing system, which allowed high resolution measurements to be taken of global methane emissions from roughly 50 major regions across Earth. It was launched in March 2024 aboard SpaceX's Transporter 10 rideshare mission.

The mission was jointly funded and operated by the Environmental Defense Fund (EDF), an American non-governmental organization, and the New Zealand Space Agency. It marked New Zealand's first space science mission. The Bezos Earth Fund, founded by Jeff Bezos, announced a US$100 million grant to EDF to support critical work including completion and launch of MethaneSAT. Sara Mikaloff-Fletcher, a National Institute of Water and Atmospheric Research (NIWA) carbon cycle expert, was the mission's lead scientist.

By 20 June 2025, contact with MethaneSAT was lost and by 2 July it was announced that the satellite has likely run out of power, rendering the satellite unrecoverable.

== History ==
The MethaneSAT program was started by MethaneSAT, LLC, a wholly owned subsidiary of the Environmental Defense Fund (EDF), with the goal of providing global high resolution data regarding methane emissions from oil and gas facilities. In January 2020, MethaneSAT announced that the spacecraft will be built using the Blue Canyon Technologies X-SAT satellite bus, with the spacecraft's methane sensing spectrometer being provided by Ball Aerospace & Technologies.

In November 2019, the New Zealand Space Agency (NZSA) joined the program, committing NZ$26 million to the program. Rocket Lab will build and operate the mission control center for the flight in Auckland, New Zealand. NZSA will also take part in launch operations and may contribute to the scientific payload. Ball Aerospace and Blue Canyon Technologies completed an intensive technology review of their respective contributions to the mission in early 2020.

On 13 January 2021, the nonprofit MethaneSAT LLC announced that it had signed a contract with SpaceX to deliver the 350 kg MethaneSAT into orbit aboard a Falcon 9 Block 5 launch vehicle with a launch window opening on 1 October 2022. By November 2022, the launch had been delayed to October 2023 by supply chain issues during the Covid-19 pandemic.

The satellite launched as part of Transporter 10 on 4 March 2024. On 1 July 2025, it was announced that contact had been lost with the satellite on 20 June 2025, and that analysis had revealed a loss of power which is likely unrecoverable. According to public broadcaster RNZ, the satellite had cost New Zealand taxpayers a total of NZ$32 million due to an extra $3 million caused by delays and investment in an unused ground Mission Control.

== Results ==
Across continental U.S. the aggregate methane loss rate across 12 basins amounts to 1.6% of gas produced, which is 8 times higher than the 0.2% emissions intensity target adopted by the Oil and Gas Climate Initiative.
