= Tianyan (satellite) =

Chinese satellite program

- 天眼卫星; Tiānyǎn Wèixīng

Program overview
- Country: People's Republic of China
- Purpose: Earth observation, Reconnaissance
- Status: Active

Program history
- First flight: 20 December 2019
- Successes: 3
- Failures: 0
- Launch site: TSLC

Vehicle information
- Launch vehicles: Long March 4B; Long March 6

Tianyan (Chinese: 天眼; pinyin: Tiānyǎn; lit. 'Sky/Heaven Eye'), often translated into English as SkyEye or Eye in the Sky, is a reconnaissance satellite program of the People's Republic of China. To date, the Tianyan satellite program has launched one satellite from the Yizheng class (Yizheng-1) and two satellites from the Xingshidai class (Xingshidai-8 and 12).

The name Tianyan (天眼) in Chinese can also refer to CCTV cameras, concept of the third eye ('divine eye' in Chinese Buddhism), clairvoyance, a 2005 cartoon, 2015 British thriller film Eye in the Sky, or the Five-hundred-meter Aperture Spherical Telescope (FAST) — a ground-based radio telescope in Guizhou Province nicknamed Tianyan.

== Satellites ==
=== Tianyan-1 ===
Tianyan-1 (天眼一号; Tiānyǎn yī hào), alternatively identified as Yizheng-1 (仪征一号; Yí Zhèng yī hào), is a commercial Chinese electro-optical Earth-imaging reconnaissance satellite launched in 2019. Yizheng 1 reportedly has a spatial resolution of 0.9 meters.

Tianyan-1 was designed and funded by Zhongxing Space Remote Sensing Satellite Technology Service Co. Ltd. (中星空间遥感卫星技术服务有限公司), a private company based in Jiangsu Province's Yizheng Economic Development Zone, where the satellite derives its name. Tianyan-1 is the first satellite designed by the company and is the first of eight planned satellites in the Yizheng constellation according to Guo Haiyu. The satellite was launched by the private satellite company MinoSpace, also known as Beijing Weina Starry Sky Technology Co. Ltd. (北京微纳星空科技有限公司簡稱微纳星空), based in Haidian District, Beijing. This launch was the company's fifth.

Tianyan-1 was launched at 11:22 am (CST) on 20 December 2019 aboard a Long March 4B (CZ-4B) rocket from Taiyuan Satellite Launch Center (TSLC) Launch Site 9 into a sun-synchronous low-earth orbit (LEO). 16 minutes after the launch (at 11:38), once the rocket had exited the atmosphere and deployed the Tianyan-1, the ground station began to receive telemetry data, and one minute later (at 11:39), the satellite indicated that it had successfully deployed its antenna and solar panels. Tianyan-1 was launched in the "One Arrow and Nine Stars" (一箭九星; Yī Jiàn Jiǔ Xīng) mission alongside eight other satellites:

- CBERS-4A, a joint Chinese-Brazilian Earth-imaging satellite and the launch's primary payload
- TianQin-1 technical test satellite (天琴一号技术试验卫星) for gravitational wave detection
- Yuheng (玉衡号卫星) internet distribution prototype satellite
- Shuntian (顺天号卫星) internet distribution prototype satellite
- ETRSS-1, Ethiopia's first satellite from the Ethiopian Space Science and Technology Institute
- FloripaSat, a Brazilian CubeSat
- Weilai-1R (未来号-1R卫星) commercial imaging satellite
- Tianyan-2 (天眼二号), also known as Xingshidai-8 (星时代八号), a low-resolution Earth imagery and 6G test platform

In a ceremony held the day of the launch, Liu Changrong (刘长荣), director of the Yizheng Economic Development Zone, announced that Tianyan-1 was the first sub-meter high-resolution optical remote sensing satellite to be independently developed, designed, manufactured, launched, and operated from Jiangsu Province. A press release published three days following the launch by Yizheng City Natural Resources and Planning Bureau described the satellite as weighing 72 kilograms and bearing a high-resolution imager to support natural resource monitoring, disaster prevention, urban planning, and emergency management; though the satellite likely also supports reconnaissance missions of the Chinese government.

=== Tianyan-2 ===
Tianyan-2 (天眼二号; Tiānyǎn èr hào), alternatively known as Xingshidai-8 (星时代八号; Xīng Shídài bā hào; 'Star Age 8'), is a commercial Chinese 6U CubeSat reconnaissance satellite bearing both a low-resolution Earth video-imager launched. The satellite also carried the nickname SciFi World AI Satellite (科幻世界号AI卫星; Kēhuàn shìjiè hào AI wèixīng) as a dedication to the SciFi community.

Tianyan-2 was jointly-developed by Beijing Micro-Nano Star and Chengdu Guoxing Aerospace Technology Co., Ltd.

Tianyan-2 was launched in 2019 alongside Tianyan-1 (Yizheng-1) as part of the "One Arrow and Nine Stars" mission at 11:22 am (CST) on 20 December 2019 aboard a Long March 4B (CZ-4B) rocket from Taiyuan Satellite Launch Center (TSLC) Launch Site 9 into a sun-synchronous low-earth orbit (LEO).

=== Tianyan-5 ===
Tianyan-5 (天眼五号; Tiānyǎn wǔ hào), alternatively known as Xingshidai-12 (星时代十二号; Xīng Shídài shí'èr hào; 'Star Age 12') or as the University of Electronic Science and Technology (ESTC) satellite (电子科技大学号卫星; Diànzǐ Kējì Dàxué hào wèixīng), is an earth-imaging satellite bearing an additional experimental '6G' communications payload. The satellite's imager and communications payload sit upon a MN50 satellite bus built by Weina (Minospace). Tianyan-5 was launched on a Long March 6 rocket from Taiyuan Satellite Launch Center (TSLC) on 6 November 2020 but decayed two years and nine months later on 8 August 2023.

== List of satellites ==
Program Name	Satellite Name	Launch	Function	Orbit	Orbital Apsis	Inclination	Period	SCN	COSPAR ID	Launcher	Launch site	Status
Tianyan-1	Yizheng-1	20 December 2019	Earth observation	SSO	617.7 km × 636.2 km	97.8°	97.1 min	44881	2019-093C	Long March 4B	TSLC Site 9	Operational
Tianyan-2	Xingshidai-8	20 December 2019	Earth observation	SSO	604.3 km × 623.2 km	97.9°	96.8 min	44882	2019-093D	Long March 4B	TSLC Site 9	Operational
Tianyan-5	Xingshidai-12	6 November 2020	Earth observation, Experimental communications	Decayed on 08 August 2023				46837	2020-079L	Long March 6	TSLC Site 16	Decayed
Tianyan-22		21 May 2024	Earth observation							Kuaizhou 11	JSLC Site 95B	
Tianyan-24	Liangping	11 November 2024	Earth observation							Kinetica 1	JSLC Site 130	
Tianyan-23	—N/a	15 March 2025	Earth observation	SSO	425.7 km × 435.0 km	97.5°	93.0 min	63209	2025-051B	Long March 2D	JSLC SLS-2	Operational
Tianyan-?	Yizheng-2	TBD March 2024	Earth observation	Unknown, not yet launched						Jielong-1	JSLC Site 95, Pad B	Unlaunched
Tianyan-?	Yizheng-3	TBD March 2024	Earth observation	Unknown, not yet launched						Jielong-1	JSLC Site 95, Pad B	Unlaunched
Table data sourced from Gunter's Space Page, N2YO, and the United States Space Force 18th Space Defense Squadron (18SDS)

== See also ==
- Yaogan
- Gaofen
- Shijian
