= MinoSpace =

Chinese satellite developer and manufacturer

Coordinates: 40.074962°N 116.240926°E

Beijing Minospace Technology Company Ltd.
- Native name: 北京微纳星空科技股份有限公司
- Romanized name: Běijīng Wēinà Xīngkōng Kējì Gǔfèn Yǒuxiàn Gōngsī
- Industry: Space technology
- Founded: 7 August 2017; 8 years ago in Beijing, China
- Headquarters: Beijing, China
- Website: www.minospace.cn

MinoSpace (Chinese: 微纳星空; pinyin: Wēinà Xīngkōng) is a major Chinese satellite technology research, development, and manufacturing firm based in the country's capital, Beijing.

Established three years after the Chinese State Council opened the space technology market to commercial participation, MinoSpace has developed and launched over two dozen remote sensing and communications satellites.

== Name ==
MinoSpace, variably written as 'Mino Space', is formally known as Beijing Weina Star Technology Company Ltd. (北京微纳星空科技股份有限公司; Běijīng Wēinà Xīngkōng Kējì Gǔfèn Yǒuxiàn Gōngsī).

The first word of the company's name, 'Mino', is sometimes left untranslated in English publications, using instead the pinyin romanization of the Chinese words 微; wēi and 纳; nà, which translate to 'micro' and 'nano', respectively. Combining these two characters to form the company's Chinese name (微纳; Wēinà), the English name 'Mino' is derived from a portmanteau of 'micro' and 'nano' into 'Mino'. The word 'Space' in the company's name is a translation of the Chinese compound (two-character) word for space, 星空; xīngkōng, which is built from the characters 星; xīng; 'star' and 空; kōng; 'sky'. At times, this portion of the company's name has been translated as 'Star' instead of 'Space'.

== History ==
=== Background ===
Historically, the Chinese space program has been exclusively state-administered and eschewed privatization of space technology development. Following the originally-espoused communist ideals of the post-Civil War era of leadership under Mao Zedong, the newly-communist People's Republic of China actively fought against technological innovation, including within the Chinese space program.

In 2014, the National Development and Reform Commission of the PRC's State Council published Document 60 (titled Guiding Opinions of the State Council on Innovating the Investment and Financing Mechanisms in Key Areas and Encouraging Social Investment) which officially opened the door to the 'first generation' of commercial Chinese space companies. Among the early commercial satellite manufacturers were the companies Commsat, CGSTL, and Space-OK.

Bolstered by Document 60 and further encouraged by the government, the previously absent investments in Chinese commercial space firms began to grow.

=== Establishment ===
As the private market for space companies entered its second generation, MinoSpace was founded on 7 August 2017 and established its headquarters in the Yongfeng Industrial Base, Haidian District, in the northwest area of Beijing city. Each of the company's founders came from the government sector and sought to bring the exclusively state-dominated satellite manufacture industry to the commercial sector.

MinoSpace's founders included Gao Enyu (高恩宇) and Wu Shufan (吴树范). Gao had previously in the design department of for the China Academy of Launch Vehicle Technology (CALT), a major state-owned civil-military launch vehicle manufacturer under the larger China Aerospace Science and Technology Corporation (CASC), and is best known for manufacturing the Long March series of rockets. Gao left CALT after two years and began work for the Communications Satellite Division (通信卫星事业部) of the China Academy of Space Technology (CAST) as chief designer of communications satellites. Finally, in August 2017, Gao departed CAST to cofound MinoSpace.

Co-founder Wu Shufan spent 17 years as a researcher and senior engineer at European institutions to include the Technical University of Braunschweig in Germany, Delt University of Technology in the Netherlands, the University of Surrey's Space Center in the United Kingdom, and at the European Space Agency's Technology Research Center. In 2013, Wu returned to China from Europe and began work as the chief engineer in Microsatellite Engineering Center of the Chinese Academy of Science (CAS).

== Operations ==
Just over a year after its establishment, the first satellite manufactured by MinoSpace was launched on 27 October 2018. The Future-1 (Welai-1) small satellite was based on MinoSpace's MN10 1.5U CubeSat and carried both two science experiments and a remote sensor for China Central Television (CCTV). Aboard the maidan launch of the Lhuque-1 rocket designed by LandSpace from Jiuquan SLC, the satellite failed to reach its intended sun-synchronous low earth orbit (LEO) and the project was declared a failure, though it did mark the first attempt to launch a satellite by a private Chinese space company. The second launch of a MinoSpace satellite occurred two days later on 29 October aboard a Long March 2C rocket at JSLC.

On 20 November 2018, MinoSpace announced that it had obtained its Series A financing.

=== Cyberattack by Anonymous ===
In response to allegations of a Chinese government disinformation campaign waged through Wikipedia edit warring, members of the hacktivist collective group Anonymous claimed to have compromised various webpages on the MinoSpace website, as well as the official website of the Chinese Ministry of Emergency Management in November 2022. The vandalized pages included images of then-President of Taiwan Tsai Ing-wen, the Taiwanese flag, cartoons of Winnie the Pooh (mocking Xi Jinping), and the slogans "Down with Xi Jinping" and "Restore the ROC".

== Products ==
MinoSpace offers three categories of products, satellite platforms, satellite communication (SATCOM) ground station equipment, and satellite components.

=== Satellite platforms ===
Model	Designation	Mass (kg)	Function
6U	CubeSat	10	Low-resolution remote sensing, data acquisition
MN10	Nanosatellite	10	Low-resolution remote sensing, data acquisition
MN10A	Microsatellite	30	Medium-resolution remote sensing
MN50	Microsatellite	50	Medium or wide-resolution remote sensing
MN100	Small satellite	100	Remote sensing, communication, IoT, navigation
MN200	Small satellite	200	High-resolution remote sensing
MN200S	Small satellite	200	High-resolution remote sensing
MN1000	High-orbit satellite	1000	Communication

=== SATCOM ===
MinoSpace also produces a Ku and Ka-band very-small-aperture terminal (VSAT), a portable telemetry tracking and command (TT&C) ground station, and a three-mode data communication terminal that interacts with 4G, Thuraya, and Beidou communication networks.

=== Satellite components ===
MinoSpace manufactures and advertises UHF/VHF deployable antennas for satellites.

== Headquarters ==
The company's headquarters are located in Beijing's Aerospace City, along with the Chinese state-owned aerospace giants, China Aerospace Science & Technology Corporation (CASC) and China Aerospace Science & Industry Corporation (CASIC), Beijing University of Aeronautics and Astronautics, the People's Liberation Army Aerospace Force's (PLAAF) Beijing Aerospace Flight Control Center (which oversees the entirety of the Chinese military and civilian space program), and a multitude of smaller aerospace companies.

== Satellites ==
Below is a list of MinoSpace satellite launches. All dates and times listed are in UTC.

List of MinoSat Satellite Launches
Date	Time	Satellite	Function	Launcher	Launch site	Orbit
27 October 2018	08:00	Weilai 1	Earth observation	Zhuque-1	Jiuquan mobile launch	Low Earth (SSO)
29 October 2018	00:43	Unknown		Long March 2C	Jiuquan SLS-2	Low Earth (SSO)
7 December 2018	04:12	Weina-1	Earth observation	Long March 2D	Jiuquan SLS-2	Low Earth (SSO)
17 August 2019	04:11	Xingshidai-5	Earth observation	Jielong 1	Jiuquan LS-95A	Low Earth (SSO)
20 December 2019	03:22	Tianyan 01 (Yizheng-1)	Earth observation	Long March 4B	Taiyuan LC-9	Low Earth (SSO)
20 December 2019	03:22	Tianyan 02	Earth observation	Long March 4B	Taiyuan LC-9	Low Earth (SSO)
20 December 2019	03:22	Wenlai-1R	Earth observation	Long March 4B	Taiyuan LC-9	Low Earth (SSO)
6 November 2020	03:19	Tianyan 05	Earth observation	Long March 6	Taiyuan LC-16	Low Earth (SSO)
27 April 2021	03:20	Taijing-2 01	Earth observation	Long March 6	Taiyuan LC-16	Low Earth (SSO)
14 October 2021	10:51	SSS-2A	Education	Long March 2D	Taiyuan LC-9	Low Earth (SSO)
27 February 2022	03:06	Taijing-3 01	Earth observation	Long March 8	Wenchang LC-2	Low Earth (SSO)
27 February 2022	03:06	Taijing-4 01	Earth observation	Long March 8	Wenchang LC-2	Low Earth (SSO)
27 February 2022	03:06	Wenchang-1 01	Earth observation	Long March 8	Wenchang LC-2	Low Earth (SSO)
27 February 2022	03:06	Wenchang-1 02	Earth observation	Long March 8	Wenchang LC-2	Low Earth (SSO)
27 February 2022	03:06	Xidian-1	Earth observation	Long March 8	Wenchang LC-2	Low Earth (SSO)
9 August 2022	04:11	Taijing-1 01 (Pingan-3)	Earth observation	Ceres-1	Jiuquan LS-95A	Low Earth (SSO)
9 August 2022	04:11	Taijing-1 02 (Xingshidai 12)	Earth observation	Ceres-1	Jiuquan LS-95A	Low Earth (SSO)
13 January 2023	07:00	Shiyan 22A	Technology demonstration	Long March 2D	Jiuquan SLS-2	Low Earth
13 January 2023	07:00	Shiyan 22B	Technology demonstration	Long March 2D	Jiuquan SLS-2	Low Earth
10 August 2023	04:03	Xiguang-1 01	Earth observation	Ceres-1	Jiuquan LS-95A	Low Earth (SSO)
10 August 2023	04:03	Xingchi-1B	Earth observation	Ceres-1	Jiuquan LS-95A	Low Earth (SSO)
23 January 2024	04:03	Taijing-1-03	Earth observation	Kinetica 1	Jiuquan LS-130	Low Earth (SSO)
23 January 2024	04:03	Taijing-2-02	Earth observation	Kinetica 1	Jiuquan LS-130	Low Earth (SSO)
23 January 2024	04:03	Taijing-2-04	Earth observation	Kinetica 1	Jiuquan LS-130	Low Earth (SSO)
23 January 2024	04:03	Taijing-3-02	Earth observation	Kinetica 1	Jiuquan LS-130	Low Earth (SSO)
23 January 2024	04:03	Taijing-4-03	Earth observation	Kinetica 1	Jiuquan LS-130	Low Earth (SSO)
