= Seiren Co. =

Seiren Co., Ltd.
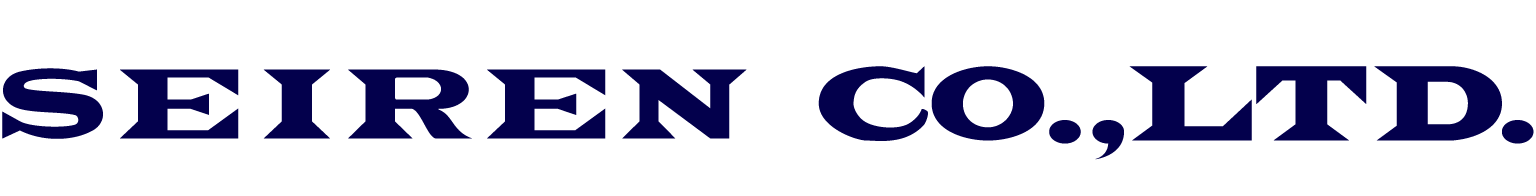

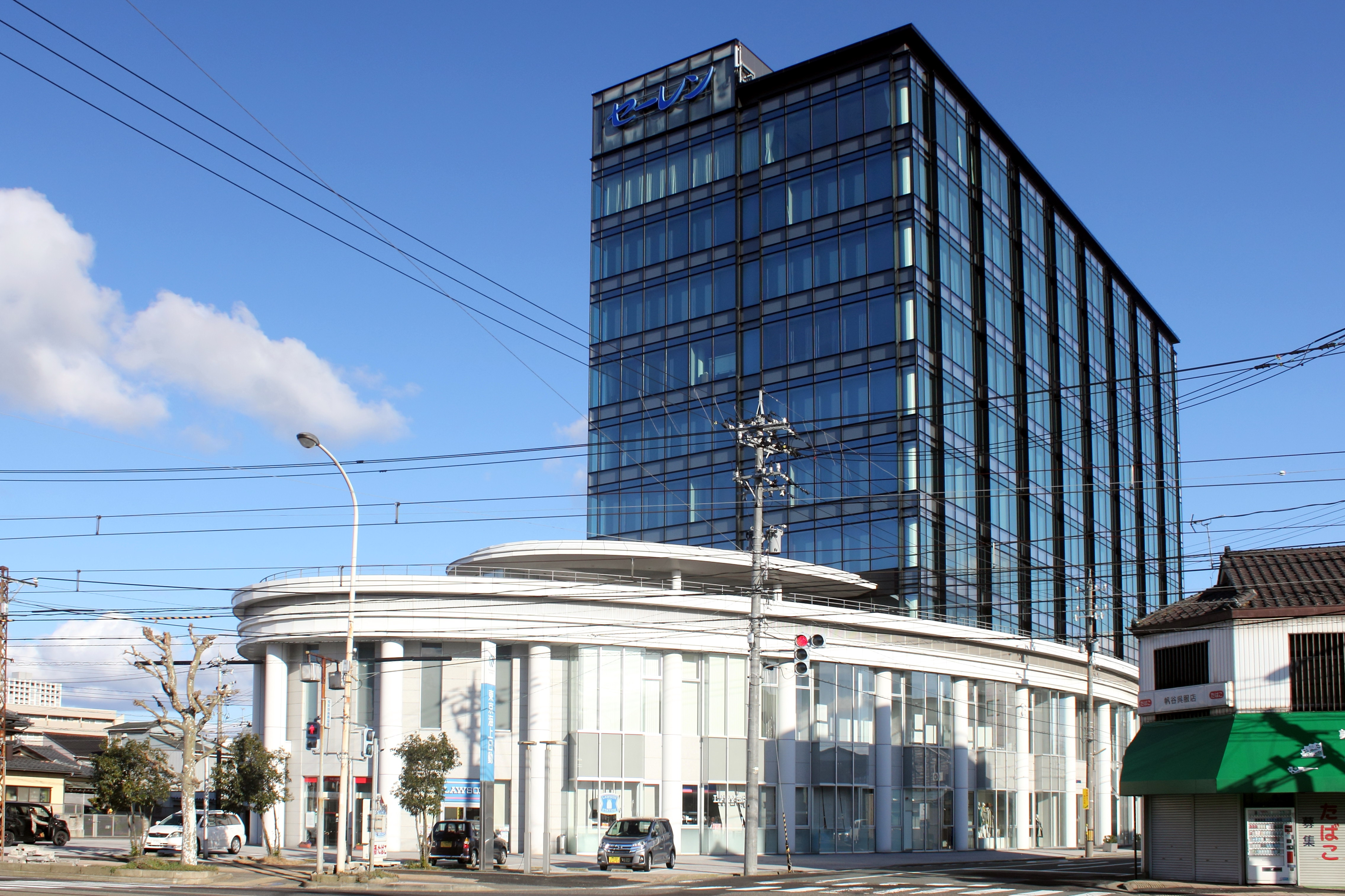
- Type: Public company
- Traded as: TYO: 3569
- Industry: Textiles/apparel, consumer goods
- Founded: 1889, established 1923/05/01
- Headquarters: Fukui
- Key people: Tatsuo Kawada, Chairman and CEO
- Products: printed fabrics, chemicals, parts, industrial machines, yarns, clothing
- Revenue: sales of ¥141.807 billion (▲7.1%) (2024)
- Operating income: operating profit of ¥13.991 billion (▲9.0%), ordinary income of ¥16.137 billion (▲5.2%) (2024)
- Net income: ¥12.271 billion (▲11.3%) (2024)
- Number of employees: 6,718 (2024)
- Website: seiren.com seiren-na.com

Seiren Co., Ltd. (セーレン株式会社, Seiren Kabushiki Kaisha) (TYO: 3569) is a Japanese fiber production and textile manufacturing conglomerate based in Fukui. Seiren was the largest textile printing firm in Japan during the 1980s, and by 2000 exceeded the equivalent of $100 million in gross annual sales.

== Overview ==
The company's printing business covers apparel, promotional materials such as printed banners, automotive upholstery, and digital dyeing. With over ¥140 billion in sales in 2024, 70% of which is overseas, Seiren spends over ¥6 billion in R&D annually as of 2024. The company also produces materials for construction, environmental, fashion industry, electronics, and medical industry products. In addition to the majority of their sales coming from outside Japan, Seiren also establishes regional manufacturing plants to bring lead times and cost of transport down. The company also develops and produces commercial medical, cosmetic, and polyester products which make use of the silkworm cocoon-derived protein sericin, for which the company holds patents.

The company has 42 offices in 10 countries. In Japan, the company operates 11 subsidiaries and a second HQ in Tokyo as well as branches in Osaka, Nagoya, and sales offices in Hiroshima, Atsugi, Toyota, Wako, and Hamamatsu. Seiren North America, LLC, the company's American subsidiary, is headquartered in Morganton, North Carolina where it has done business under the name Viscotec Automotive Products, with other US offices in Farmington Hills, Michigan, near Detroit, and Irvine, California. The company is a supplier to the American car industry, as well as Toyota, and has received capital investment from the fellow Japanese company. It also has supplied other Japanese automakers Nissan, Mitsubishi and Honda.

== History ==
Seiren traces their history to 1889 and the production of habutai silk fabric. The company was founded by Eijiro Kurokawa and Ihachi Ueda. The company's early business specialized in a "refining" process of removing impurities from silk fabric sent from Kyoto, which gave the company its name. The company incorporated as Fukui Seiren Kako Co., Ltd. and established the textile dyeing/finishing business in 1923. Japan's textile industry attained its peak during the postwar period of growth, but subsequently declined. Seiren first entered the electronics market in 1970.

Tatsuo Kawada (born 1940) joined the company in 1962 and became president in 1987, CEO in 2005, and Chairman in 2011. He led the release of a textile car seat in 1976 which was a hit for the company and helped him get his promotion. The company faced an existential crisis due to Japanese restrictions on textile exports to the US starting in 1971, contemporaneous oil supply shocks, and a strong yen caused by the 1985 Plaza Accord. During this time, Kawada took over as president, and the company began working on a sample printer to create patterns on fabric for mass production. Kawada helped transform the company through vertical integration of the supply chain.

Seiren began to develop digital printing in 1989, and made inkjet printing available in addition to its analog process in 1991. The company was an innovator in a proprietary "Viscotecs" ("VISual COmmunication TEChnology"), a type of late-1980s inkjet printing process which enabled customers to custom-print designs on T-shirts, an early example of mass customization. Viscotecs could print in 16.77 million colors, an improvement on the typical 20 colors at the time.

In 2005, the company acquired the textile division of Kanebo Cosmetics, which it turned around into a profitable business by 2008.
