= New Zealand Space Agency =

Agency overview
- Formed: April 2016; 10 years ago
- Jurisdiction: New Zealand
- Headquarters: 15 Stout Street; Wellington 6011
- Minister responsible: Chris Penk, Minister for Space
- Agency executive: Carolyn Tremain, Chief Executive
- Website: New Zealand Space Agency

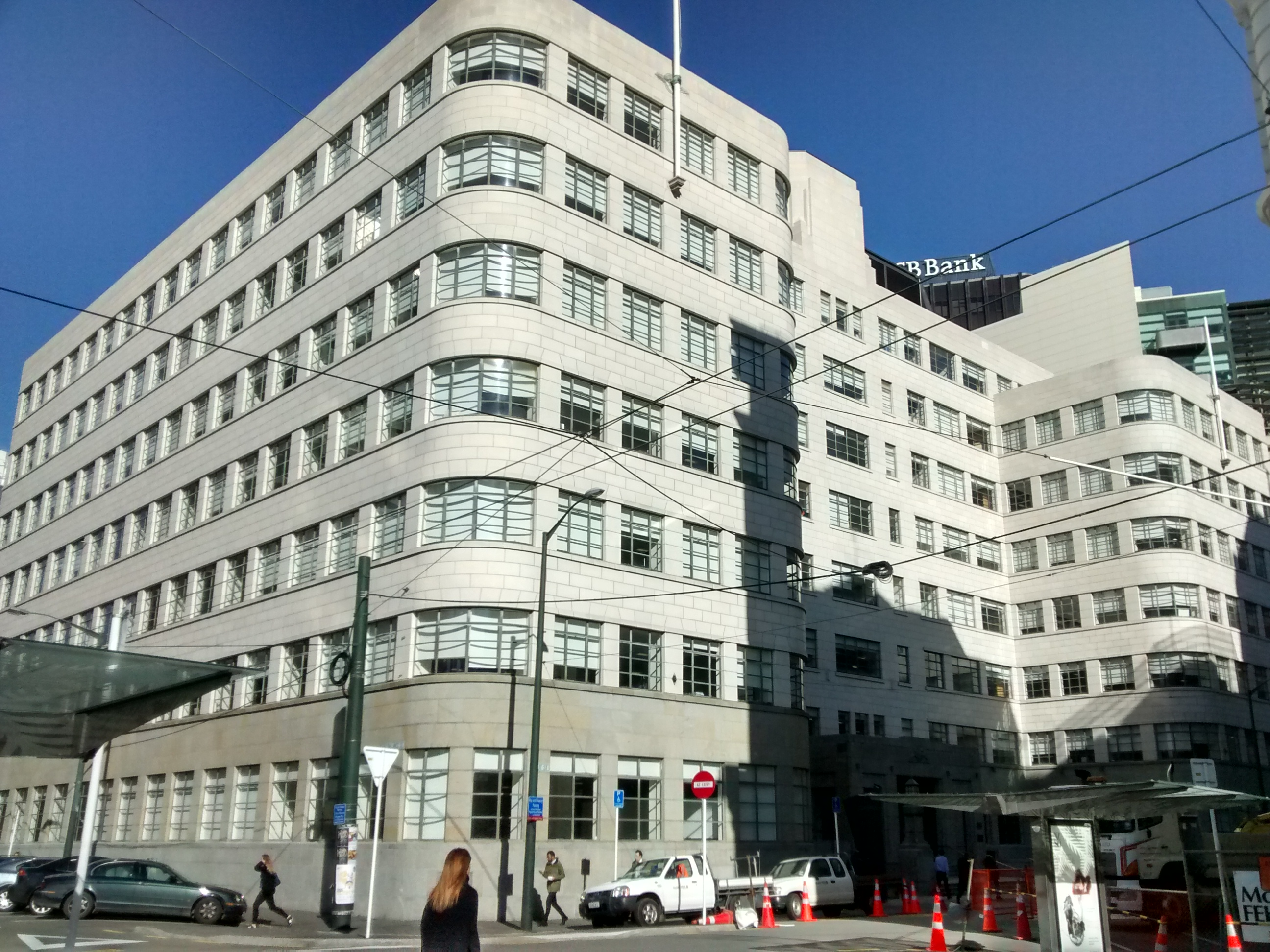
New Zealand Space Agency's head office on Stout Street, Wellington (the former Defence House).

The New Zealand Space Agency is an agency within the New Zealand Ministry of Business, Innovation and Employment (MBIE) charged with "space policy, regulation and business development" relating to space activities in New Zealand.

== History ==
The New Zealand Space Agency was formed in April 2016 under the country's Ministry of Business, Innovation and Employment. The aim of the agency is to promote the development of a space industry in New Zealand and to reap its economic benefits, and to regulate the country's growing commercial space industry. This includes space launches by the New Zealand subsidiary of Rocket Lab, an American aerospace company, and creating new regulation in partnership with the Civil Aviation Authority of New Zealand to fly a suborbital spaceplane from conventional airports.

=== MethaneSAT ===
In November 2019, the agency signed a partnership with American non-governmental organization Environmental Defense Fund to work on MethaneSAT, an Earth observation satellite that will study human methane emissions in order to better track and combat climate change. As part of the partnership, the agency has contributed NZ$29.35 million for research and the rights to host mission control. The mission marked New Zealand's first government-funded space mission and successfully launched in early 2024.

On 19 August 2020, Dr Sara Mikaloff-Fletcher, a former carbon cycling expert at NIWA, was named as lead scientist on the mission.

On 2 July 2025, the Space Agency confirmed that the owners of MethaneSAT had lost contact with the satellite on 20 June 2025 and that recovery was unlikely. RNZ reported that the satellite had cost taxpayers a total of NZ$32 million due to an extra $3 million caused by delays and investment in an unused ground Mission Control.

=== Artemis Accords ===
On 1 June 2021, the NZSA signed the Artemis Accords, making New Zealand the 11th signatory of the accords. An announcement released the same day stated, "New Zealand has joined an international arrangement to co-operate with NASA on peaceful exploration and activity in outer space. Foreign Minister Nanaia Mahuta and Economic Development Minister Stuart Nash announced the government has agreed to join the Artemis Accords, launched by the U.S. National Aeronautics and Space Administration, and now signed by eleven nations." NASA administrator Bill Nelson later congratulated the agency.

=== NZ-USA Space Framework Agreement ===
On 9 August 2022, New Zealand and the United States signed a framework agreement to launch new space sector opportunities. Stuart Nash signed the Framework Agreement with United States Deputy Secretary of State, Wendy Sherman. The signing followed Prime Minister Jacinda Ardern and Vice President Kamala Harris welcoming the completion of negotiations on this agreement during their meeting in Washington, DC on 31 May 2022.

== See also ==
- List of government space agencies
