= Bujold =

Bujold is a surname. Notable people with the surname include:

- Edèse J. Bujold, Canadian politician
- Geneviève Bujold, Canadian actress
- Guy Bujold, former president of the Canadian Space Agency
- Lois McMaster Bujold, American science fiction and fantasy author
- Mandy Bujold, Canadian boxer
- Rémi Bujold, former Canadian politician
- Sarah Bujold, (born 1996), Canadian ice hockey player
