= ASVS =

ASVS is an initialism with following meanings:

- Advanced Space Vision System, a computer vision system designed primarily for ISS assembly
- Application Security Verification Standard, a standard to performing application-level security verifications
