= HD 189733 b =

Hot Jupiter exoplanet in the constellation Vulpecula

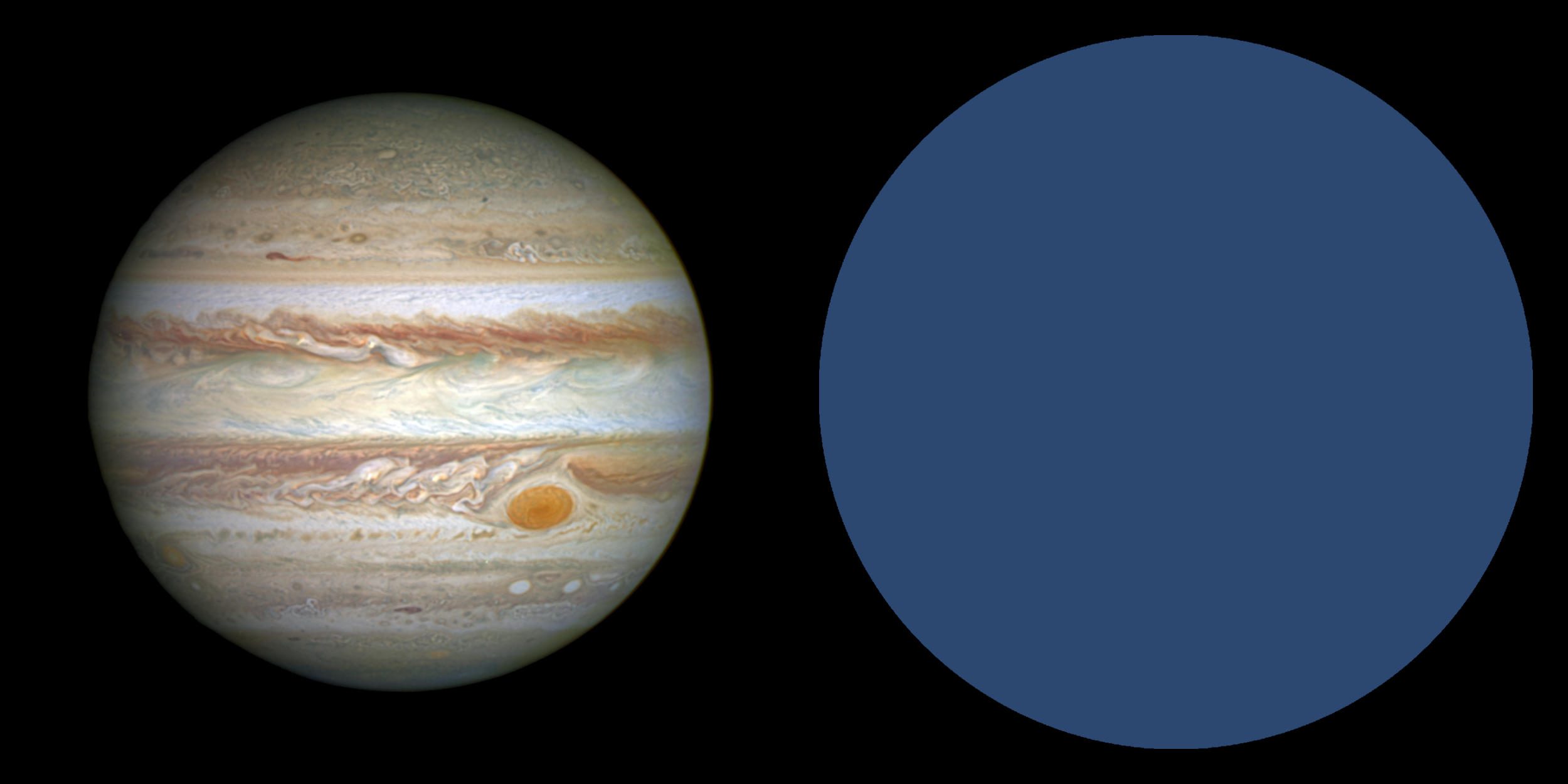
- Jupiter and HD 189733 b compared

Discovery
- Discovered by: Bouchy et al.
- Discovery site: Haute-Provence Observatory
- Discovery date: October 5, 2005
- Detection method: Doppler spectroscopy Transit

Orbital characteristics
- Semi-major axis: 0.03100 ± 0.0006 AU (4,638,000 ± 90,000 km)
- Eccentricity: <0.0039
- Orbital period (sidereal): 2.218575200(77) d 53.2458048 h
- Average orbital speed: 152.0 km/s
- Inclination: 85.580°±0.060°
- Semi-amplitude: 201.3±1.6 m/s
- Star: HD 189733

Physical characteristics
- Mean radius: 1.138±0.027 R_{J}
- Mass: 1.123±0.045 M_{J}
- Mean density: 0.943+0.081 −0.072 g/cm^{3}
- Surface gravity: 21.5 m/s^{2} (2.2 g)
- Albedo: 0.40±0.12 (290–450 nm) <0.12 (450–570 nm); 0.076±0.016 (geometric)
- Temperature: 1,192±9 K (919 °C; 1,686 °F); 1,490±68 K (1,220 °C; 2,220 °F)

HD 189733 b is an exoplanet in the constellation of Vulpecula approximately 64.5 light-years (19.8 parsecs) away from the Solar System. Astronomers in France discovered the planet orbiting the star HD 189733 on October 5, 2005, by observing its transit across the star's face. With a mass 11.2% higher than that of Jupiter and a radius 11.4% greater, HD 189733 b orbits its host star once every 2.2 days at an orbital speed of 152.0 kilometers per second (340,000 miles per hour), making it a hot Jupiter with poor prospects for extraterrestrial life.

The closest transiting hot Jupiter to Earth, HD 189733 b has been the subject of close atmospheric observation. Scientists have studied it with high- and low-resolution instruments, both from the ground and from space. Researchers have found that the planet's weather includes raining molten glass. HD 189733 b was also the first exoplanet to have its thermal map constructed, possibly to be detected through polarimetry, its overall color determined (deep blue), its transit viewed in the X-ray spectrum, and to have carbon dioxide confirmed as being present in its atmosphere.

In July 2014, NASA announced the discovery of very dry atmospheres on three exoplanets that orbited Sun-like stars: HD 189733 b, HD 209458 b, and WASP-12b.

== Detection and discovery ==
=== Transit and Doppler spectroscopy ===
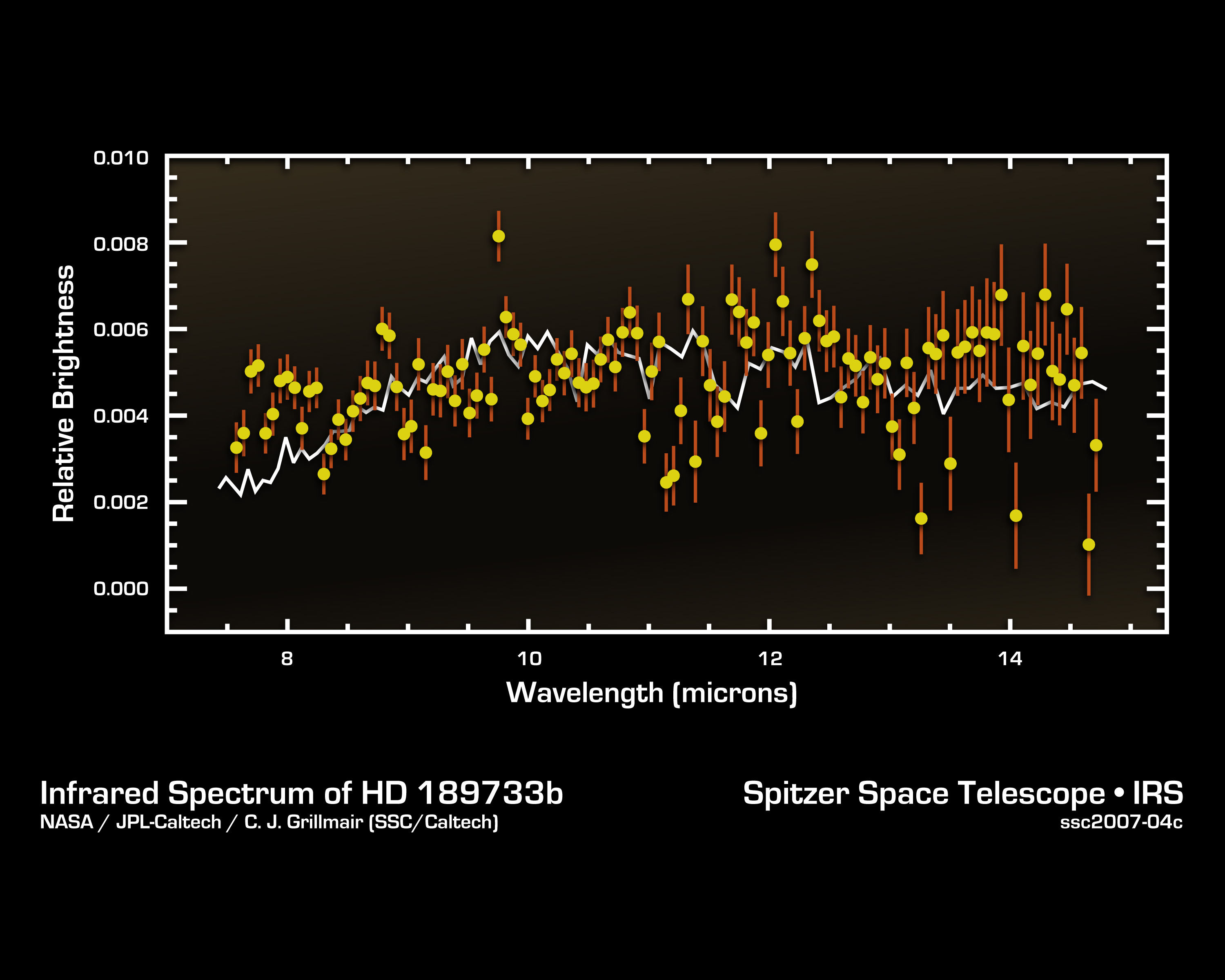
The infrared spectrum of HD 189733 b

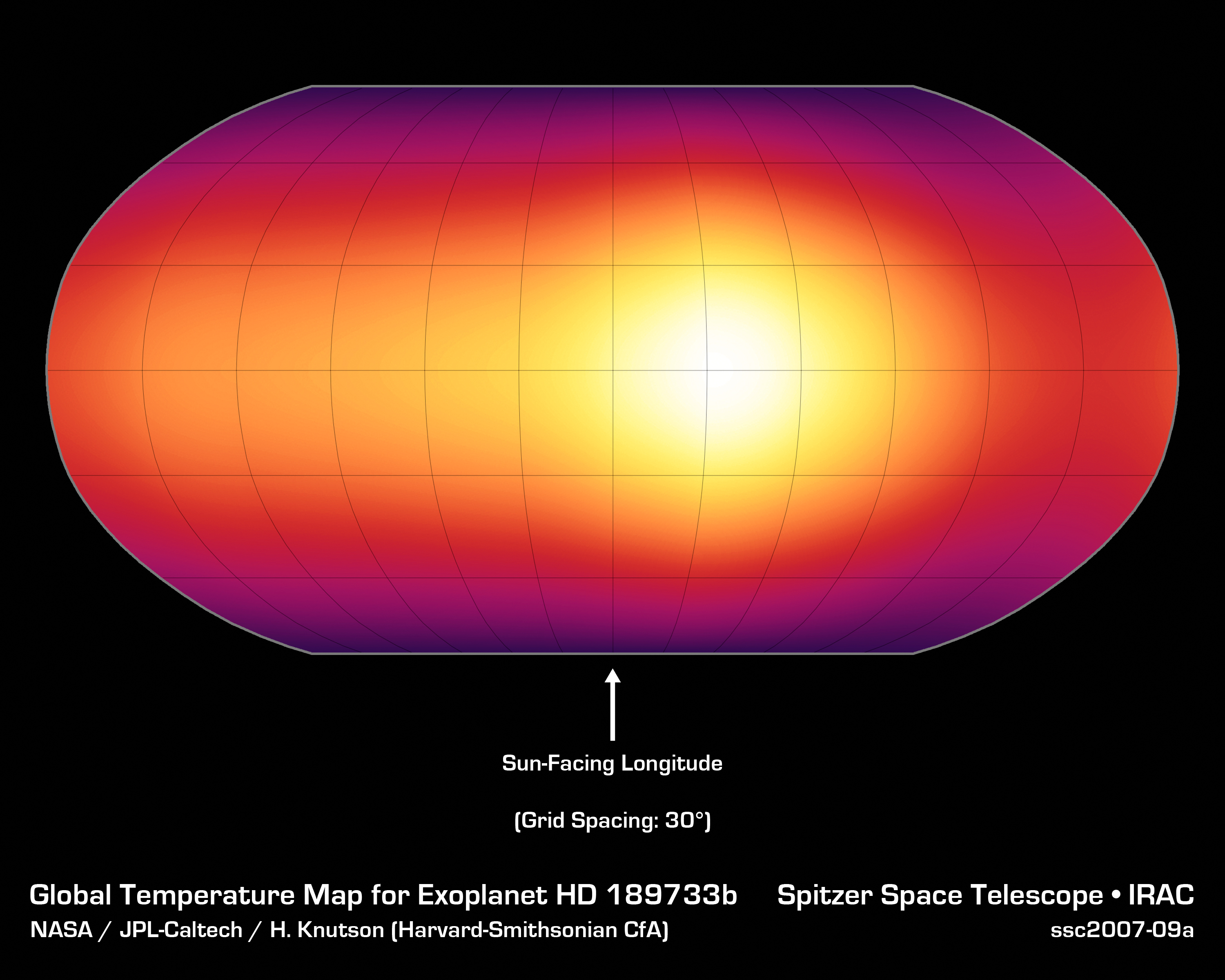
A global temperature map of HD 189733 b

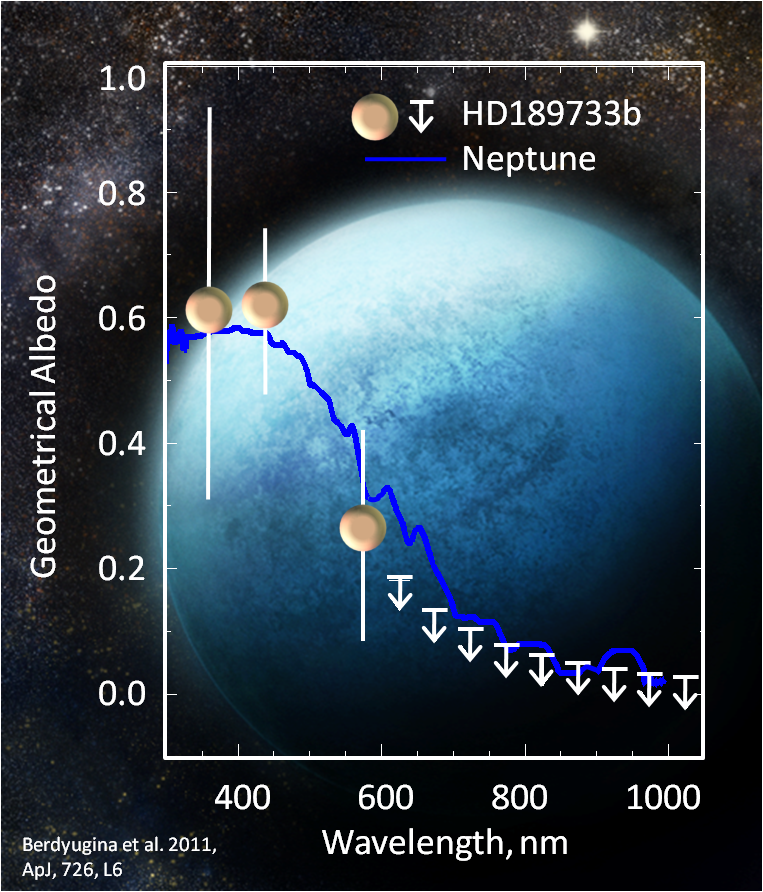
The planet's blue color was revealed using polarimetry.

On October 6, 2005, a team of astronomers announced the discovery of transiting planet HD 189733 b. The planet was then detected using Doppler spectroscopy. Real-time radial velocity measurements detected the Rossiter–McLaughlin effect caused by the planet passing in front of its star before photometric measurements confirmed that the planet was transiting. In 2006, a team led by Drake Deming announced detection of strong infrared thermal emission from the transiting exoplanet planet HD 189733 b, by measuring the flux decrement (decrease of total light) during its prominent secondary eclipse (when the planet passes behind the star).

The mass of the planet is estimated to be 16% larger than Jupiter's, with the planet completing an orbit around its host star every 2.2 days and an orbital speed of 152.5 kilometres per second (341,000 mph).

=== Infrared spectrum ===
On February 21, 2007, NASA released news that the Spitzer Space Telescope had measured detailed spectra from both HD 189733 b and HD 209458 b. The release came simultaneously with the public release of a new issue of Nature containing the first publication on the spectroscopic observation of the other exoplanet, HD 209458 b. A paper was submitted and published by the Astrophysical Journal Letters. The spectroscopic observations of HD 189733 b were led by Carl Grillmair of NASA's Spitzer Science Center.

=== Visible color ===
In 2008, a team of astrophysicists appeared to have detected and monitored the planet's visible light using polarimetry, which would have been the first such success. This result seemed to be confirmed and refined by the same team in 2011. They found that the planet albedo is significantly larger in blue light than in the red, most probably due to Rayleigh scattering and molecular absorption in the red. The blue color of the planet was subsequently confirmed in 2013, which would have made HD 189733 the first planet to have its overall color determined by two different techniques. The measurements in polarized light have since been disputed by two separate teams using more sensitive polarimeters, with upper limits of the polarimetric signal provided therein.

The rich cobalt blue colour of HD 189733 b may be the result of Rayleigh scattering. In mid January 2008, spectral observation during the planet's transit using that model found that if molecular hydrogen exists, it would have an atmospheric pressure of 410 ± 30 mbar of 0.1564 solar radii. The Mie approximation model also found that there is a possible condensate in its atmosphere, magnesium silicate (MgSiO_{3}) with a particle size of approximately 10^{−2} to 10^{−1} μm. Using both models, the planet's temperature would be between 1340 and 1540 K. The Rayleigh effect is confirmed in other models, and by the apparent lack of a cooler, shaded stratosphere below its outer atmosphere. In the visible region of the spectrum, thanks to their high absorption cross sections, atomic sodium and potassium can be investigated. For example, using high-resolution UVES spectrograph on the Very Large Telescope, sodium has been detected on this atmosphere and further physical characteristics of the atmosphere such as temperature has been investigated.

=== X-ray spectrum ===
In July 2013, NASA reported the first observations of planet transit studied in the X-ray spectrum. It was found that the planet's atmosphere blocks three times more X-rays than visible light.

=== Evaporation ===
Short narrated video about the evaporation of HD 189733 b's atmosphere

In March 2010, transit observations using HI Lyman-alpha found that this planet is evaporating at a rate of 1–100 gigagrams per second. This indication was found by detecting the extended exosphere of atomic hydrogen. HD 189733 b is the second planet after HD 209458 b for which atmospheric evaporation has been detected.

== Physical characteristics ==
This planet exhibits one of the largest photometric transit depth (amount of the parent star's light blocked) of extrasolar planets so far observed, approximately 3%. The apparent longitude of ascending node of its orbit is 16 degrees +/− 8 away from the north–south in our sky. It and HD 209458 b were the first two planets to be directly spectroscopically observed. The parent stars of these two planets are the brightest transiting-planet host stars, so these planets will continue to receive the most attention from astronomers. Like most hot Jupiters, this planet is thought to be tidally locked to its parent star, meaning it has a permanent day and night.

The planet is not oblate, and has neither satellites with greater than 0.8 the radius of Earth nor a ring system like that of Saturn.

The international team under the direction of Svetlana Berdyugina of Zurich University of Technology, using the Swedish 60-centimeter telescope KVA, which is located in Spain, was able to directly see the polarized light reflected from the planet. The polarization indicates that the scattering atmosphere is considerably larger (> 30%) than the opaque body of the planet seen during transits.

The atmosphere was at first predicted "pL class", lacking a temperature-inversion stratosphere; like L dwarfs which lack titanium and vanadium oxides. Follow-up measurements, tested against a stratospheric model, yielded inconclusive results. Atmospheric condensates form a haze 1,000 kilometres (620 mi) above the surface as viewed in the infrared. A sunset viewed from that surface would be red. Sodium and potassium signals were predicted by Tinetti 2007. First obscured by the haze of condensates, sodium was eventually observed at three times the concentration of HD 209458 b's sodium layer. The potassium was also detected in 2020, although in significantly smaller concentrations. HD 189733 is also the first extrasolar planet confirmed to have carbon dioxide in its atmosphere. In 2024, hydrogen sulfide was detected in HD 189733 b's atmosphere, and a different analysis also identified lithium and sodium in the atmosphere.

=== Map of the planet ===
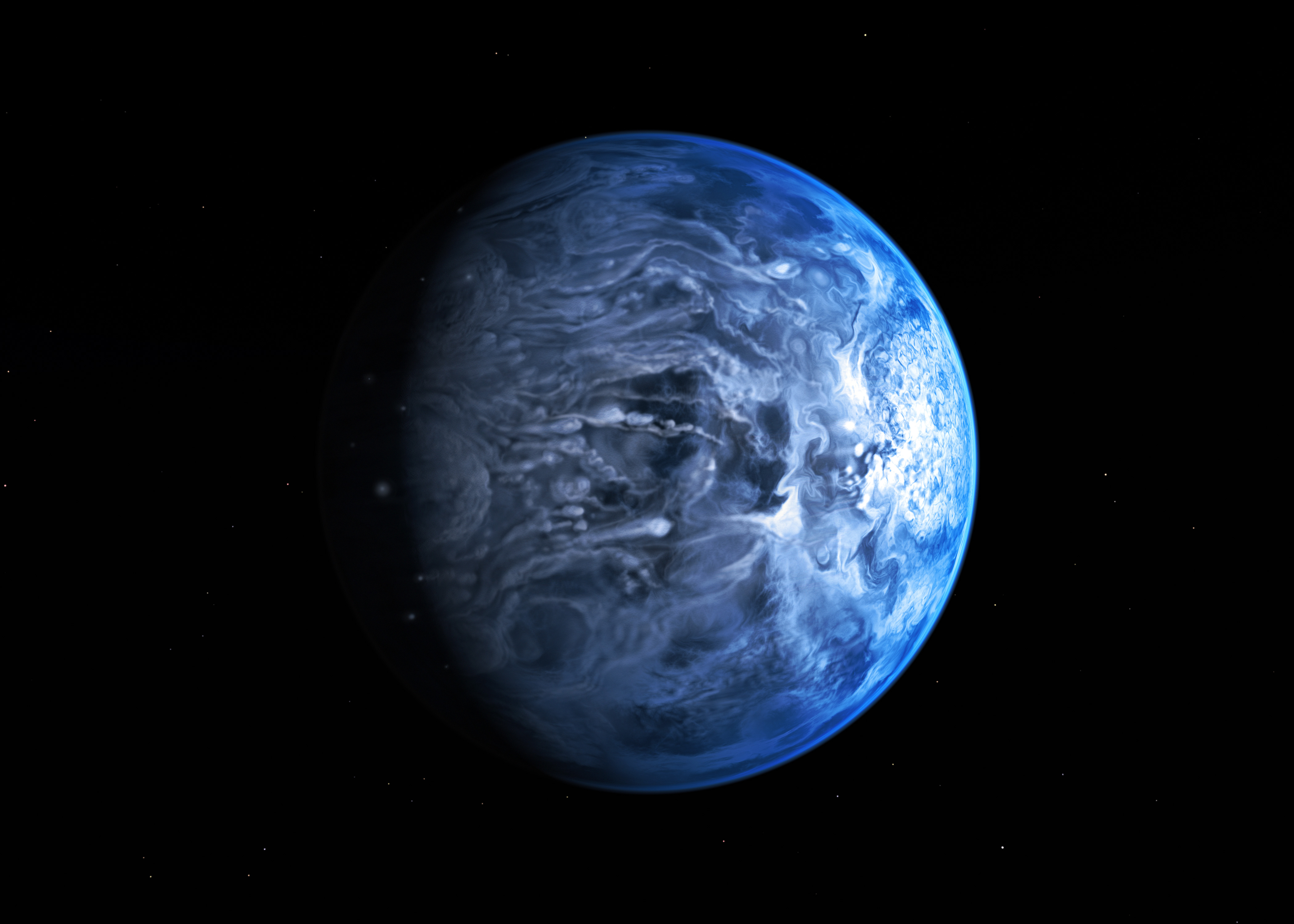
An artist's conception of HD 189733 b following the 2013 confirmation of the planet's blue color by the Hubble Space Telescope. The appearance of HD 189733 b beyond the blue color is unknown.

In 2007, the Spitzer Space Telescope was used to map the planet's temperature emissions. The planet and star system was observed for 33 consecutive hours, starting when only the night side of the planet was in view. Over the course of one-half of the planet's orbit, more and more of the dayside came into view. A temperature range of 973 ± 33 K to 1,212 ± 11 K was discovered, indicating that the absorbed energy from the parent star is distributed fairly evenly through the planet's atmosphere. The region of peak temperature was offset 30 degrees east of the substellar point, as predicted by theoretical models of hot Jupiters taking into account a parameterized day to night redistribution mechanism.

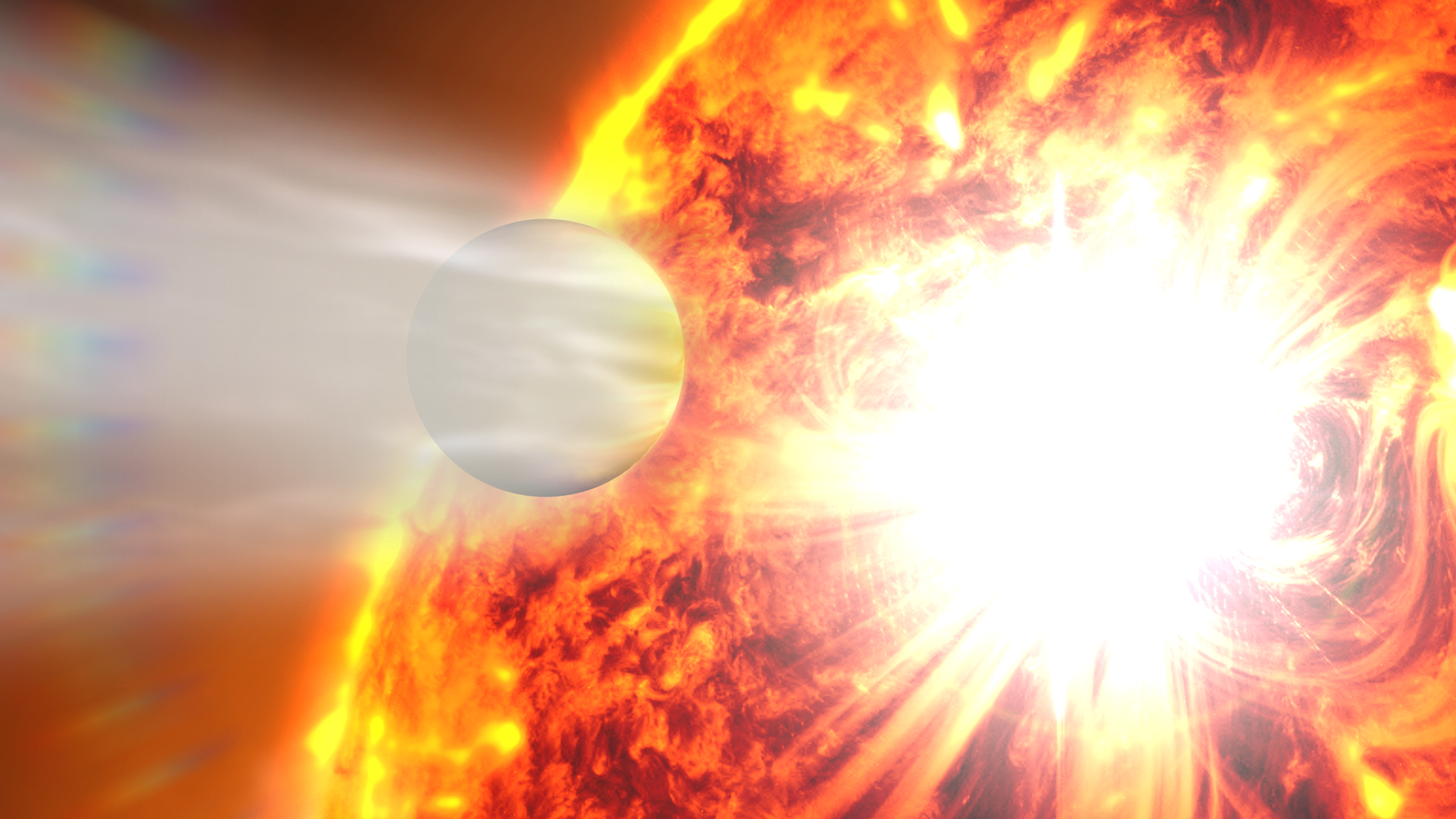
An artist's impression of HD 189733 b showing rapid evaporation of the atmosphere

Scientists at the University of Warwick determined that HD 189733 b has winds of up to 8,700 km/h (5,400 mph) blowing from the day side to the night side. NASA released a brightness map of the surface temperature of HD 189733 b; it is the first map ever published of an extra-solar planet.

=== Water vapor, oxygen, and organic compounds ===
On July 11, 2007, a team led by Giovanna Tinetti published the results of their observations using the Spitzer Space Telescope concluding there is solid evidence for significant amounts of water vapor in the planet's atmosphere. Follow-up observations made using the Hubble Space Telescope confirm the presence of water vapor, neutral oxygen and also the organic compound methane. Later, Very Large Telescope observations also detected the presence of carbon monoxide on the day side of the planet. It is currently unknown how the methane originated as the planet's high 700 °C temperature should cause the water and methane to react, replacing the atmosphere with carbon monoxide. Nonetheless, the presence of roughly 0.004% of water vapour fraction by volume in atmosphere of HD 189733 b was confirmed with high-resolution emission spectra taken in 2021.

NASA Exoplanet Exploration Program "horror film poster" for HD 189733 b

=== Evolution ===
While transiting the system also clearly exhibits the Rossiter–McLaughlin effect, shifting in photospheric spectral lines caused by the planet occulting a part of the rotating stellar surface. Due to its high mass and close orbit, the parent star has a very large semi-amplitude (K), the "wobble" in the star's radial velocity, of 205 m/s.

The Rossiter–McLaughlin effect allows the measurement of the angle between the planet's orbital plane and the equatorial plane of the star. These are well aligned, misalignment equal to -0.5±0.4°. By analogy with HD 149026 b, the formation of the planet was peaceful and probably involved interactions with the protoplanetary disc. A much larger angle would have suggested a violent interplay with other protoplanets.

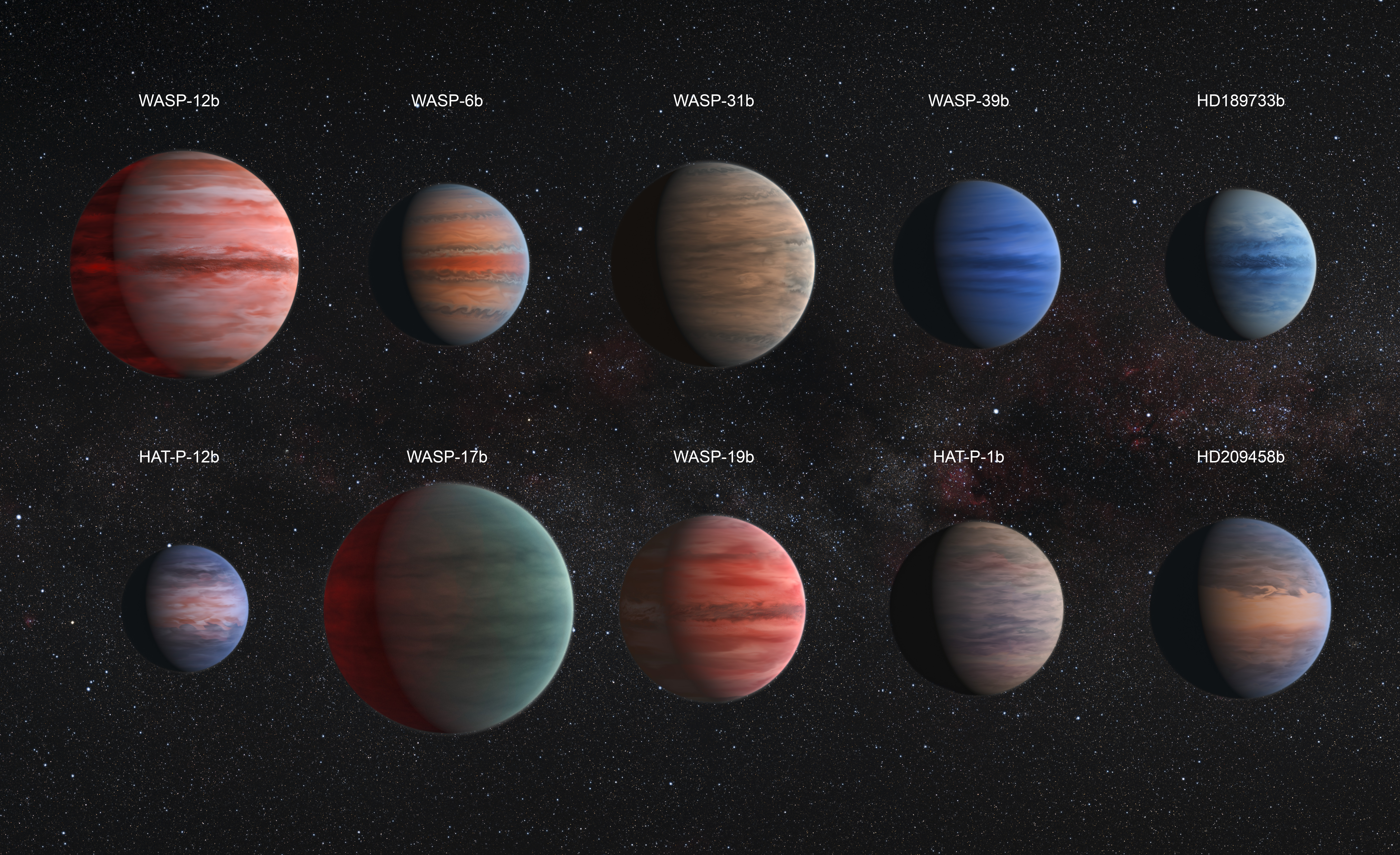
Comparison of "hot Jupiter" exoplanets (artist concept). From top left to lower right: WASP-12b, WASP-6b, WASP-31b, WASP-39b, HD 189733 b, HAT-P-12b, WASP-17b, WASP-19b, HAT-P-1b and HD 209458 b.

== Star-planet interaction controversy ==
In 2008, a team of astronomers first described how as the exoplanet orbiting HD 189733 A reaches a certain place in its orbit, it causes increased stellar flaring. In 2010, a different team found that every time they observe the exoplanet at a certain position in its orbit, they also detected X-ray flares. Theoretical research since 2000 suggested that an exoplanet very near to the star that it orbits may cause increased flaring due to the interaction of their magnetic fields, or because of tidal forces. In 2019, astronomers analyzed data from Arecibo Observatory, MOST, and the Automated Photoelectric Telescope, in addition to historical observations of the star at radio, optical, ultraviolet, and X-ray wavelengths to examine these claims. They found that the previous claims were exaggerated and the host star failed to display many of the brightness and spectral characteristics associated with stellar flaring and solar active regions, including sunspots. Their statistical analysis also found that many stellar flares are seen regardless of the position of the exoplanet, therefore debunking the earlier claims. The magnetic fields of the host star and exoplanet do not interact, and this system is no longer believed to have a "star-planet interaction." Some researchers had also suggested that HD 189733 accretes, or pulls, gas from its orbiting exoplanet at a rate similar to those found around young protostars in T Tauri Star systems. Later analysis demonstrated that very little, if any, gas was accreted from the "hot Jupiter" companion.

== Possible exomoons ==
Some studies have proposed candidate exomoons around HD 189733 b. A 2014 study proposed a moon based on studying periodic increases and decreases in light given off from HD 189733 b. This moon would be outside of the planet's Hill sphere, making its existence implausible. Two studies by the same team in 2019 and 2020 proposed exo-Io candidates around a number of hot Jupiters, including HD 189733 b and WASP-49b, based on detected sodium and potassium, consistent with evaporating exomoons and/or their corresponding gas torus. A follow-up study in 2022 did not find evidence for an exomoon around HD 189733 b.

== See also ==
- Dimidium (51 Pegasi b)
- HD 2039 b
- HD 149026 b
- Kepler-186f
- Osiris (HD 209458 b)
- WASP-3b
- WASP-12b
- WASP-189 b
