= CSA Scientific Research on the International Space Station =

This is a list of all the research and Science activity the Canadian Space Agency has done.

== CSA reported ISS Research and Science Activity ==
=== Experiments ===
- APEX-CAMBIUM - Advanced Plant Experiments on Orbit

Funded by the Canadian Space Agency (CSA), APEX-Cambium will help determine the role gravity plays in trees forming different kinds of wood.

- BCAT-5 - Binary Colloidal Alloy Test
- BISE - Bodies In the Space Environment
- CCISS - Space travel can be dizzying
- EVARM - Radiation monitoring experiment

Radiation monitoring experiment is called EVARM and it was conducted in 2002 and 2003

- H-Reflex (ISS Experiment)
- MEIS-2 (ISS Experiment)
- MVIS (ISS Experiment)
- PMDIS (ISS Experiment)
- SODI-IVIDIL (ISS Experiment)
- RaDI-N (ISS Experiment)

=== Fields ===
- Space Medicine

== See also ==
- Canadian Space Agency
- Scientific research on the International Space Station
