= Sylvain Laporte =

Previous CSA President

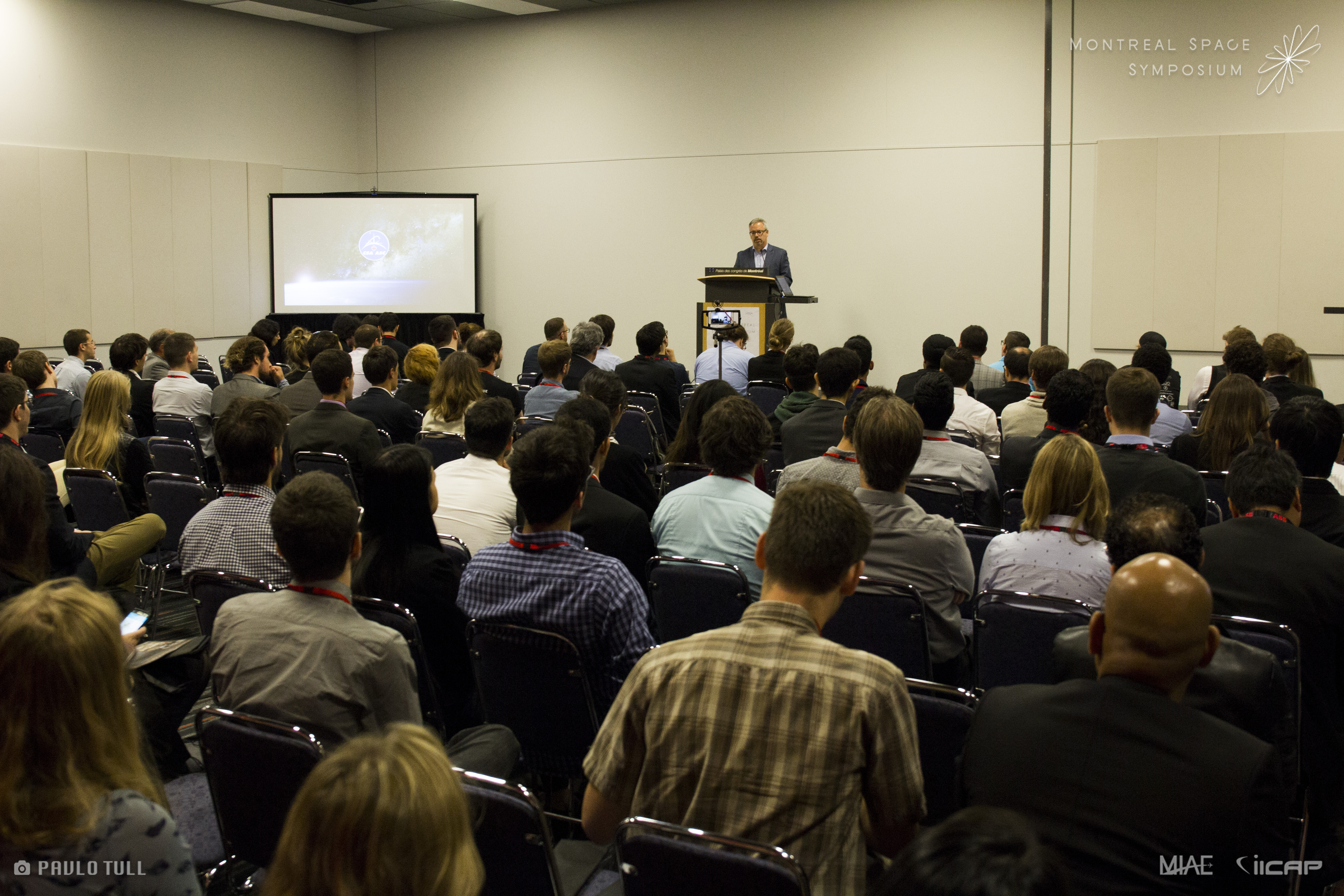
- Sylvain Laporte presenting at the Montreal Space Symposium

President of the Canadian Space Agency
- In office March 2015 – 3 September 2020
- Appointed by: Stephen Harper
- Preceded by: Luc Brûlé (acting); Walter Natynczyk
- Succeeded by: Lisa Campbell

Military service
- Allegiance: Canadian Armed Forces
- Years of service: 1978–1998

Sylvain Laporte is a Canadian Armed Forces veteran who served as the 11th president of the Canadian Space Agency from March 2015 until September 3, 2020.

== Early life ==
Sylvain Laporte was born in Quebec, Canada. Due to his father serving in the Canadian Armed Forces (CAF), he grew in various areas in Canada including Quebec, Alberta, and Ontario but also in Lahr, Germany.

Laporte's hobbies include major renovations and fixing cars.

== Career ==
=== Canadian Forces ===
Sylvain Laporte started his career after getting a bachelor's degree in computer science and master's degree in computer engineering from the Royal Military College of Canada (RMC), Sylvain Laporte earned his two degrees while serving in the military from 1978–1989 as an aerospace engineer.

=== Canada Post ===
After leaving the CAF, Sylvain Laporte joined Canada Post as director of information technology. He held this post for two years before becoming director for retail. He held this role for five years, before becoming director of logistics, which he held for two years.

=== Industry Canada ===
After leaving Canada Post in 2007, Laporte was hired as chief informatics officer for Industry Canada. Laporte held this role for two years before becoming executive director of the Integrated Technologies Office within Industry Canada.

In April 2011, Laporte was hired as chief executive officer of the Canadian Intellectual Property Office, which he held for four years until March 2015.

=== Canadian Space Agency president ===
In March 2015, Laporte was appointed as the 11th Canadian Space Agency (CSA) president, taking over from Luc Brule who had been serving as interim president following the departure of Walter Natynczyk. On October 21, 2019, Laporte appeared at the International Astronautical Federation alongside representatives from various space organizations including NASA, ESA, JAXA, the Vikram Sarabhai Space Centre, Roscosmos and the Indian Space Research Organisation.

He announced in September 2020 that he would leave the role of CSA president.

Government offices
Preceded by Mary Carman	Commissioner of Patents, Registrar of Trademarks and Chief Executive Officer of the Canadian Intellectual Property Office; 2011–2015	Succeeded by Johanne Bélisle
