= HIP 116454 b =

Extrasolar planet

Discovery
- Discovered by: Vanderburg, et al.
- Discovery site: Kepler
- Discovery date: February 2014
- Detection method: Transit

Designations
- Alternative names: K2-2b

Orbital characteristics
- Semi-major axis: 0.0792+0.0011 −0.0010 au
- Eccentricity: 0.215+0.056 −0.094
- Orbital period (sidereal): 9.1004157+0.0000041 −0.0000045 d
- Inclination: 88.91+0.68 −0.45°
- Argument of periastron: 88+19 −20°
- Semi-amplitude: 3.54±0.42 m/s
- Star: HIP 116454

Physical characteristics
- Mean radius: 2.469+0.10 −0.091 R_{🜨}
- Mass: 9.7±1.2 M_{🜨}
- Mean density: 3.53+0.63 −0.57 cgs
- Temperature: 753.2+7.1 −6.9 Kelvin

HIP 116454 b, or K2-2 b, is an exoplanet orbiting the star HIP 116454, 62 parsecs (201 ly) from Earth toward the constellation Pisces. It is 32,000 kilometres (20,000 mi) in diameter and 12 times as massive as Earth. It was discovered by the NASA Kepler spacecraft, and is the first exoplanet discovered during Kepler's K2 mission. The discovery was announced on December 18, 2014. HIP 116454 b does not have a normal Kepler designation due to not being located in the original Kepler field.

HIP 116454 b was discovered in a Kepler engineering data set which was collected in preparation of the first full K2 campaign. Unlike most other Kepler planets, only a single transit event of HIP 116454 b was detected, requiring follow-up radial velocity measurements by the HARPS-N spectrograph and photometric measurements by the Canadian MOST satellite.

Physical characteristics of HIP 116454 b are expected to be similar to Kepler-68b, being somewhere between super-Earth and mini-Neptune.
