= HD 189733 =

Binary star system in the constellation Vulpecula

HD 189733 AB
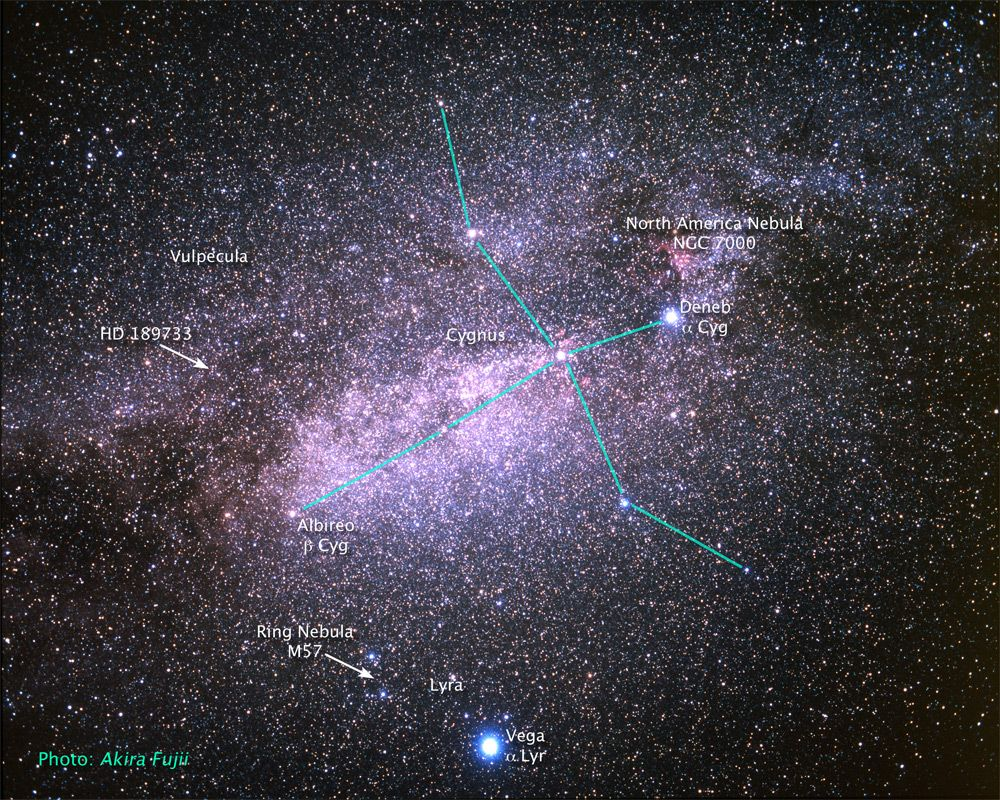
- The location of the HD 189733 system.

Observation data Epoch J2000.0 Equinox ICRS
- Constellation: Vulpecula
- HD 189733 A
- Right ascension: 20^{h} 00^{m} 43.71294^{s}
- Declination: +22° 42′ 39.0732″
- Apparent magnitude (V): 7.676
- HD 189733 B
- Right ascension: 20^{h} 00^{m} 42.97791^{s}
- Declination: +22° 42′ 34.1785″
- Apparent magnitude (V): ~10

Characteristics
- Spectral type: K1.5V/M
- Apparent magnitude (B): 8.609 ±0.016/
- Apparent magnitude (J): 6.07/10.116 ±0.041
- Apparent magnitude (H): 5.59/9.545 ±0.086
- Apparent magnitude (K): 5.54/9.323 ±0.027
- Variable type: BY Draconis

Astrometry

HD 189733 A
Radial velocity (R_{v})	−2.53±0.12 km/s
Proper motion (μ)	RA: −3.208(11) mas/yr Dec.: −250.323(14) mas/yr
Parallax (π)	50.5668±0.0162 mas
Distance	64.50 ± 0.02 ly (19.776 ± 0.006 pc)
Absolute magnitude (M_{V})	6.2

HD 189733 B
Radial velocity (R_{v})	1.46±1.21 km/s
Proper motion (μ)	RA: −12.193(9) mas/yr Dec.: −253.993(12) mas/yr
Parallax (π)	50.6291±0.0136 mas
Distance	64.42 ± 0.02 ly (19.751 ± 0.005 pc)

Orbit
Secondary	HD 189733 B
Period (P)	3,200 yr
Semi-major axis (a)	11.38" (216 AU)

Details
Mass	0.846+0.068 −0.049 M_{☉}
Radius	0.805±0.016 R_{☉}
Luminosity	0.328±0.011 L_{☉}
Surface gravity (log g)	4.56±0.03 cgs
Temperature	4875±43 K
Metallicity [Fe/H]	−0.03±0.08 dex
Rotation	11.953±0.009 days
Age	4.3±2.8 Gyr

Other designations
- V452 Vulpeculae, BD+22 3887, GJ 4130, HD 189733, HIP 98505, SAO 88060, LTT 15851, NLTT 48568, Wolf 864, TOI-4470, TIC 256364928, TYC 2141-972-1, 2MASS J20004370+2242391

Database references
SIMBAD	A
- B
Exoplanet Archive	data

HD 189733, also catalogued as V452 Vulpeculae, is a binary star system 64.5 light-years (19.8 parsecs) away in the constellation of Vulpecula (the Fox). The primary star is suspected to be an orange dwarf star, while the secondary star is a red dwarf star. Given that this system has the same visual magnitude as HD 209458, it promises much for the study of close transiting extrasolar planets. The star can be found with binoculars 0.3 degrees east of the Dumbbell Nebula (M27).

As of 2005, it has been confirmed that an exoplanet, HD 189733 b, orbits the primary star within the system.

== Stellar system ==
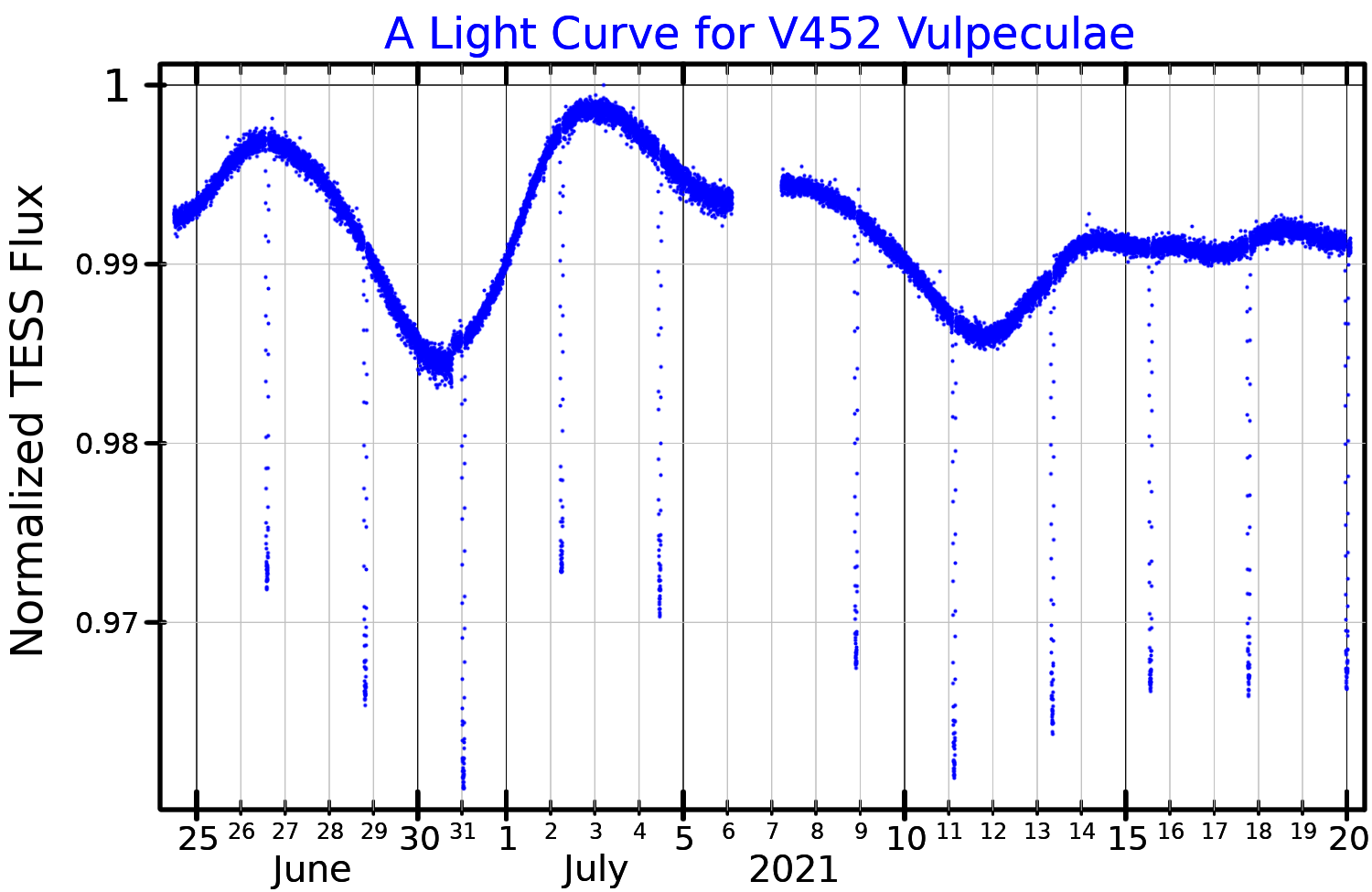
A light curve for V452 Vulpeculae, plotted from TESS data. Both the slow variation of the star's luminosity and the abrupt dips caused by planet transits (which occur every 2.219 days) are visible.

HD 189733 A is an orange dwarf star of the spectral type K1.5V. The star has a mass of 81 percent that of the Sun, a radius of 76 percent, and a luminosity of 33 percent. The star is between 89 and 102 percent as enriched in iron as the Sun, making the star more than 600 million years old. Its absolute magnitude is 6.2.

In the year 2000, Klaus G. Strassmeier et al. announced their discovery that the star's brightness varies. The star has starspots which affect its luminosity by 1.5 percent in visible light. As a result, in 2006 it was added to the General Catalogue of Variable Stars as a BY Draconis variable with the variable star designation V452 Vul.

Discovered in 2006 by the infrared 2MASS astronomical survey, 2MASS J20004297+2242342 or HD 189733 B is a dim red dwarf star of spectral type M. The companion was observed at a separation of 216 astronomical units away from the primary star. Orbiting in a clockwise orbit (which is nearly perpendicular to the orbital plane of transiting planet HD 189733 b), the orbital period is estimated to be around 3,200 years long.

== Planetary system ==
HD 189733 A has one known planet, designated HD 189733 b, a gaseous giant 13% larger than Jupiter close enough to complete an orbit every two days. Using spectrometry it was found in 2007 that this planet contains significant amounts of water vapour. This planet is the second extrasolar planet where definitive evidence for water has been found.

The chemical signature of water vapour was detected in the atmosphere of this planet. Although HD 189733b with atmospheric temperatures rising above 1,000 °C (1,830 °F) is far from being habitable, this finding increases the likelihood that water, an essential component of life, would be found on a more Earth-like planet in the future.

Astronomers have created a rough map of HD 189733b's cloud-top features using data from the Spitzer infrared space telescope.

Although Spitzer could not resolve the planet into a disk, by measuring changes as the planet rotated, the team created a simple longitudinal map. That is, they measured the planet's brightness in a series of pole-to-pole strips across the planet's visible cloud-tops, then assembled those strips into an overall picture.

Probably due to strong winds, the hottest point on the planet seems to be "offset by about 30 degrees longitudinally" from the substellar point ("high noon").

In late 2008, the spectral signature of carbon dioxide was found in HD 189733b's atmosphere.

In 2013, albedo measurements at visible wavelengths in the range of 290–570 nm using the Hubble Space Telescope STIS (Space Telescope Imaging Spectrograph) instrument, reported in the Astrophysical Journal Letters, determine the planet to have a deep blue hue due to optically thick reflective clouds containing silicates (glass) "rain". The paper detailing the results reports measurement of "geometric albedos of Ag = 0.40 ± 0.12 at 290–450 nm [near ultraviolet to blue in the visible light region of the electromagnetic spectrum] and Ag < 0.12 at 450–570 nm ... with sodium absorption suppressing the scattered light signal beyond ~450 nm as predicted by models of hot Jupiter atmospheres."

An atmospheric transmission spectrum taken in 2020 has shown the presence of opaque haze, and spectral signatures of sodium and potassium.

Transit timing variations of HD 189733 b were discovered in 2021, suggesting other planets do exist in the system.

The HD 189733 planetary system
Companion (in order from star)	Mass	Semimajor axis (AU)	Orbital period (days)	Eccentricity	Inclination (°)	Radius
b	1.123±0.045 M_{J}	0.03100±0.0006	2.218575200(77)	<0.0039	85.58±0.06	1.138±0.027 R_{J}

== Star-planet interaction controversy ==
In 2008, a team of astronomers first described how as the exoplanet orbiting HD 189733 A reaches a certain place in its orbit, it causes increased stellar flaring. In 2010, a different team found that every time they observe the exoplanet at a certain position in its orbit, they also detected X-ray flares. Theoretical research since 2000 suggested that an exoplanet very near to the star that it orbits may cause increased flaring due to the interaction of their magnetic fields, or because of tidal forces. In 2019, astronomers analyzed data from Arecibo Observatory, MOST, and the Automated Photoelectric Telescope, in addition to historical observations of the star at radio, optical, ultraviolet, and X-ray wavelengths to examine these claims. They found that the previous claims were exaggerated and the host star failed to display many of the brightness and spectral characteristics associated with stellar flaring and solar active regions, including sunspots. Their statistical analysis also found that many stellar flares are seen regardless of the position of the exoplanet, therefore debunking the earlier claims. The magnetic fields of the host star and exoplanet do not interact, and this system is no longer believed to have a "star-planet interaction." Some researchers had also suggested that HD 189733 accretes, or pulls, material from its orbiting exoplanet at a rate similar to those found around young protostars in T Tauri Star systems. Later analysis demonstrated that very little, if any, gas was accreted from the "hot Jupiter" companion.

== See also ==
- List of extrasolar planets
- 2MASS, the Two Micron All-Sky Survey
- ELODIE spectrograph
