= John H. Chapman Space Centre =

Headquarters of the Canadian Space Agency

Agency overview
- Formed: 1992
- Type: Research and Technological Development
- Jurisdiction: Government of Canada
- Headquarters: Longueuil, Quebec; 45.5198°N 73.3936°W
- Employees: < 600
- Parent agency: CSA
- Website: www.asc-csa.gc.ca/eng/default.asp

The John H. Chapman Space Centre (French: Centre Spatial John H. Chapman) is the headquarters of the Canadian Space Agency. It is located in Longueuil, Quebec, Canada, in the borough of Saint-Hubert.

== Location and name ==
The centre has a total surface area of 41 hectares (101 acres) located on the border of the Montreal Metropolitan Airport. The building is supposed to look somewhat like a space station.

The building was finished in 1992 and named Canadian Space Agency Headquarters, and in 1996, it was renamed the John H. Chapman Space Centre in honour of John Chapman for his accomplishments in the Canadian Space Program and because of his role in the Alouette 1 program.

== Programs ==
The centre houses the Canadian astronaut office and most of the administrative and technical units supporting Canada's programs in space sciences and technology. This includes satellite control rooms, the Protein Crystal Growth Mission Support Centre, and simulators for the Canadarm2, the Mobile Servicing System, and the Advanced Space Vision System. It also houses the Mission Operations Centre (MOC) that includes the Remote Multi-Purpose Support Room (RMPSR) that is used to operate the MSS on-orbit in conjunction with the flight control and mission evaluation rooms at the Johnson Space Center as well as the Operations and Engineering Centre (OEC) which supports the flight controllers at JSC. As the headquarters for the space agency, it also houses many offices for general administrative functions or for specific programs such as exchange activities with NASA, ESA, ISRO and other national space agencies.
