= John Herbert Chapman =

Canadian space researcher

John Herbert Chapman (August 28, 1921 – September 28, 1979) was a Canadian space researcher. He started his career with his work on radio propagation and the ionosphere.

Chapman grew up in London, Ontario, the son of Lt. Col. Lloyd Chapman and Kathleen Chapman. He received his BSc (Honors) from The University of Western Ontario in London, Ontario in 1948, and later received a Master of Science degree and a Ph.D. in physics at McGill University in Montreal, Quebec. After his studies at university, Chapman got his first position in the government with the Defence Research Board (DRB). He was then promoted to the position of section leader of the ionospheric propagation unit at the Defense Research Telecommunications Establishment , which is now the Communications Research Centre (CRC) in 1951 at Shirley's Bay, a Canadian military and civilian telecommunication research campus. He was also a superintendent.

While at Shirley's Bay, Chapman worked on a number of projects. One of the projects he directed was the ground-breaking Canadian satellite called Alouette. The DRTE having no experience developing satellites had to work quite hard to think of and counter all the difficulties they would face in the harsh environment of space. Because of his work on Alouette he was promoted to chairman of a government study group to study the upper atmosphere and space programs in Canada.

While chairman, Chapman compiled his findings into "The Chapman Report" in which he argued that Canada needed to redirect its space program in order to continue its ongoing research more effectively and efficiently. "The Chapman Report" remains an important document in helping the Canadian Space Agency choose what they should work on when it comes to space programs.

Chapman was given awards for his work in aerospace technology. The first was given by the Royal Society of Canada in 1966; he also received an Engineering medal from the Association of Professional Engineers of Ontario and the Dillinger Gold Medal from the International Union of Radio Scientists the same year. In 1967 Chapman was awarded The Chree Medal and Prize and the McCurdy award from the Canadian Aeronautics and Space Institution.

Chapman was a member of the Royal Society of Canada. He was also part of the National Research Council (NRC) Associate committee on Space Research, a council of the top Canadian space scientists. He also served on the International Union of Radio Science and the American Geophysical Union.

Chapman died in Vancouver, BC in 1979. After his death, the Canadian Space Agency was formed to organize and give Canada its own space agency to create a central place to meet and work on Canadian space projects. With this new organization, Canada has been able to construct and launch new projects into orbit. One of the most important Canadian projects is Canadarm, which has become used frequently on the International Space Station (or ISS for short).

When the headquarters building of the Canadian Space Agency was completed in 1992, it was named the John H. Chapman Space Centre, in his honour.

Asteroid (14163) JohnChapman is named after Chapman.
