= Lisa Campbell (civil servant) =

Canadian public servant

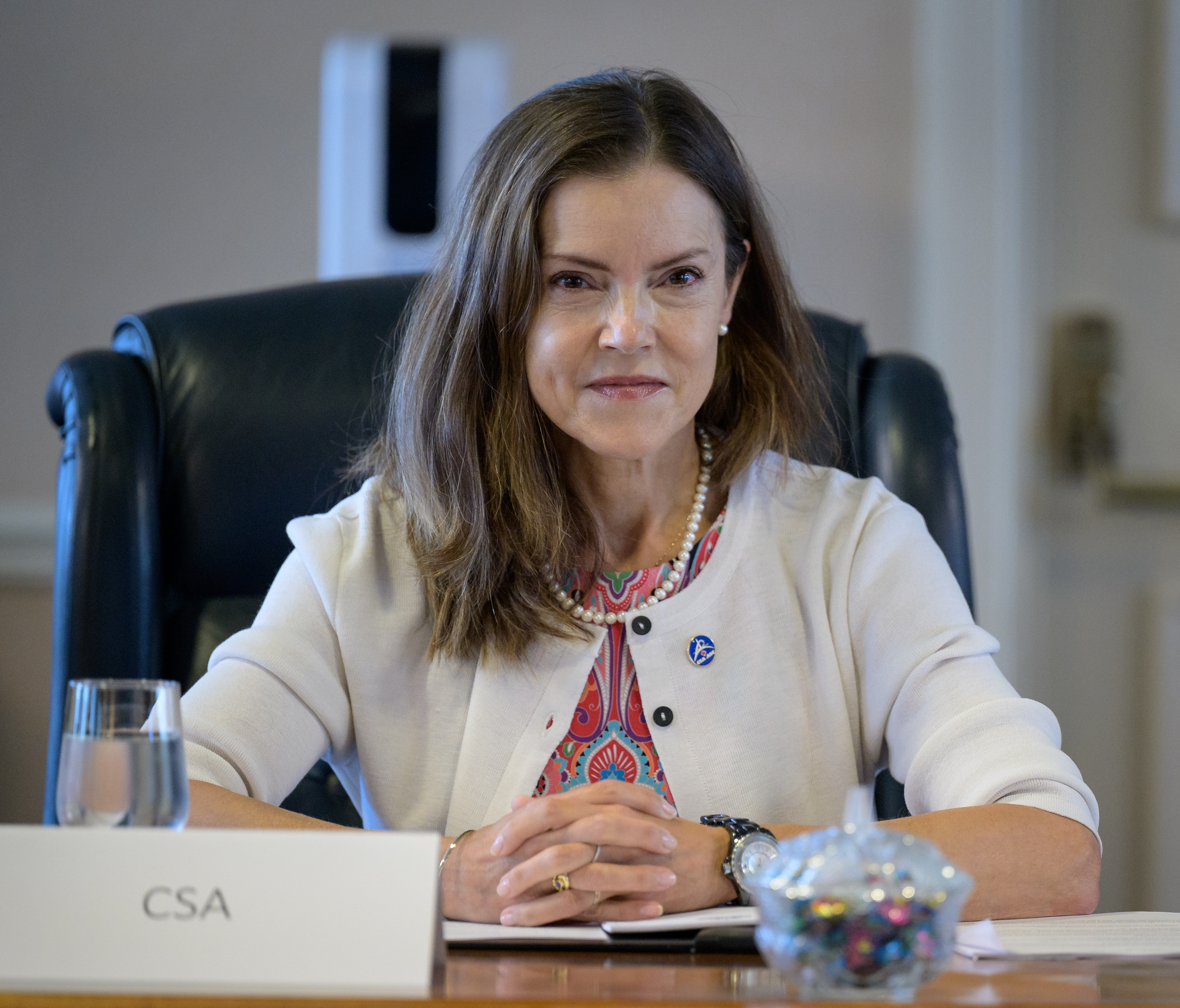
- Campbell in 2021

President of the Canadian Space Agency
- Incumbent
- Assumed office September 14, 2020
- Preceded by: Sylvain Laporte

Personal details
- Education: McGill University (BA, 1988); Dalhousie University (LLB, 1991)

Lisa Campbell is a Canadian lawyer and civil servant who was the president of the Canadian Space Agency between 2020 and 2026.

== Education and legal career ==
Campbell completed a Bachelor of Arts in political science from McGill University in 1988, followed by an LL.B from Dalhousie Law School in 1991. She worked as a lawyer in the fields of criminal, employment and constitutional law.

== Federal government career ==
After becoming assistant deputy minister of defence and marine procurement, where she was involved in military procurement such as fighter jet replacement, Campbell went on to become associate deputy minister for Veterans Affairs Canada.

=== President of the Canadian Space Agency ===
On September 3, 2020, Campbell was announced as the new president of the Canadian Space Agency, becoming the first woman appointed to the role in a full-time capacity. She replaced outgoing President Sylvain Laporte. She was replaced by acting president Jean-Claude Piedboeuf in July 2026.
