= President of the Canadian Space Agency =

- Présidence à l'Agence spatiale canadienne
- Arms of the Canadian Space Agency
- Incumbent; Lisa Campbell since 3 September 2020
- Canadian Space Agency
- Reports to: Minister of innovation, science and industry
- Appointer: Governor in Council
- First holder: Larkin Kerwin
- Website: www.asc-csa.gc.ca

The president of the Canadian Space Agency (French: présidence à l’Agence spatiale canadienne) is the title of the head of the Canadian Space Agency. The current president is Lisa Campbell who has been incumbent since 5 September 2020.

== History ==
On March 1, 1989, the Canadian Space Agency was founded. Larkin Kerwin was appointed as the first president of the Canadian Space Agency

== List of presidents of the Canadian Space Agency ==
No.	Portrait	Name	Took office
1		Larkin Kerwin	March, 1989
2		Roland Doré	May 4, 1992
3		William MacDonald Evans	November 21, 1994
4		Marc Garneau	November 22, 2001
5		Laurier J. "Larry" Boisvert	April 12, 2007
6		Guy Bujold	January 1, 2008
7		Steve MacLean	September 2, 2008
8		Gilles Leclerc	February 2, 2013
9		Walter Natynczyk	August 6, 2013
10		Luc Brûlé	November 3, 2014
11		Sylvain Laporte	March 9, 2015
12		Lisa Campbell	September 3, 2020

== See also ==
- Minister of Innovation, Science and Industry
- Similar positions worldwide
  - Europe: Director General of the European Space Agency
  - India: Chairman of ISRO
  - Russia: General Director of Roscosmos
  - United States: Administrator of NASA
