= Advanced Space Vision System =

Computer image content processing system used by NASA

The Advanced Space Vision System (also known as the Space Vision System or SVS) is a computer vision system designed primarily for International Space Station (ISS) assembly. The system uses regular 2D cameras in the Space Shuttle bay, on the Canadarm, or on the ISS along with cooperative targets to calculate the 3D position of an object.

Because of the small number of viewing ports on the station and on the shuttle, most of the assembly and maintenance is done using cameras, which do not give stereoscopic vision, and thus do not allow a proper evaluation of depth. In addition the difficult conditions created by the particular conditions of illumination and obscurity in space, make it much more difficult to distinguish objects, even when the assembly work can be viewed directly, without using a camera. For instance, the harsh glare of direct sunlight can blind human vision. Also, the contrasts between objects in black shadows and objects in the solar light are much greater than in Earth's atmosphere, even where no glare is involved.

== Background ==
The Advanced Space Vision System images objects with cooperative targets and uses the known positions of the targets to triangulate their exact relative positions in real time. The targets are composed of thin films of silicon dioxide layered with inconel to form an inconel interference stack. A stack like this has nearly no reflectivity in the Electromagnetic spectrum. The result is a black color that appears even blacker than the flattest black paint. In photos the disks look like small black dots, and a minimum of three are needed, so they are quite unobtrusive on most payloads.

== Development ==
The basic elements of the system were devised at the National Research Council of Canada in the 1970s, to study car collisions. In 1990, development was transferred to Neptec Design Group, a small commercial enterprise located in Kanata, a suburb of Ottawa. The system runs on Neptec's Advanced Vision Unit (AVU) processing platform, which handles video routing, algorithm processing, video overlays, and the system interface. The operating system is the Unix-like and POSIX compliant QNX Real-time operating system, running the Photon windowing interface. The Photon implementation was optimized to be the most worry free direct manipulation interface possible for the particular needs and work habits of the astronauts.

The Canadian Space Agency was involved at several stages in the development and deployment of the space vision system. Training for the system takes place in the simulators located at the agency's headquarters at the John H. Chapman Space Centre near Montreal.

== Implementation ==
The system was first tested in its early form on STS-52 in October 1992, and used in subsequent missions. The advanced version was first tested on STS-74 in November 1995. The system has been used with success on shuttle flights since then, and with equal success for the assembly and maintenance of the station since 1997.
