= Guy Bujold =

Canadian government official

Guy Bujold is a former president and CEO of CANARIE Inc and former president of the Canadian Space Agency, appointed January 1, 2008. He was succeeded on September 2, 2008, by Steve MacLean. After his retirement from the federal public service, Bujold was appointed interim chairperson of the Civilian Review and Complaints Commission for the RCMP in September 2017, a position which he held until January 2019. From August 2020 to February 2021, Bujold was senior executive of the Bio-manufacturing Strategy Implementation Team at Innovation, Science and Economic Development Canada.

Prior to his appointment as the CSA president, he held various positions in numerous departments within the government of Canada including Industry Canada, Infrastructure Canada, Fisheries and Oceans Canada, the Department of Finance, Treasury Board Secretariat, Health Canada, Privy Council Office. He worked for the government of Ontario, prior to his federal career. He has also provided strategic policy, government relations and communications advice to public, para-public and private sector clients.

Bujold has been active in the volunteer sector, including as a member and chair of the board of the Children's Hospital of Eastern Ontario Research Institute, and subsequently as a member and chair of the board of the Health Data Research Network of Canada.

Bujold earned a master's degree in economics from York University.
