= MOST (spacecraft) =

Canada's first space telescope

Microvariability and Oscillations of Stars/Microvariabilité et Oscillations STellaire
- Names: MOST
- Mission type: Astronomy
- Operator: CSA
- COSPAR ID: 2003-031D
- SATCAT no.: 27843
- Website: MOST home page
- Mission duration: Final: 15 years, 9 months

Spacecraft properties
- Launch mass: 53 kg (117 lb)
- Dimensions: 60 cm × 60 cm × 24 cm (23.6 in × 23.6 in × 9.4 in)
- Power: 35 W

Start of mission
- Launch date: 30 June 2003, 14:15 UTC
- Rocket: Rockot/Briz-KM
- Launch site: Plesetsk 133/3
- Contractor: Eurockot

End of mission
- Disposal: Decommissioned
- Deactivated: March 2019

Orbital parameters
- Reference system: Geocentric
- Regime: Polar
- Semi-major axis: 7,203 km (4,476 mi)
- Eccentricity: 0.0010821
- Perigee altitude: 824.7 km (512.4 mi)
- Apogee altitude: 840.3 km (522.1 mi)
- Inclination: 98.7157 degrees
- Period: 101.4 minutes
- RAAN: 126.1054 degrees
- Argument of perigee: 129.3968 degrees
- Mean anomaly: 230.8168 degrees
- Mean motion: 14.20521415 rev/day
- Epoch: 27 April 2016, 11:16:58 UTC
- Revolution no.: 66487

Main telescope
- Type: Maksutov catadioptric
- Diameter: 15 cm (5.9 in)
- Focal length: 88.2 cm (34.7 in)
- Wavelengths: 350-750 nm (Visible light)

The Microvariability and Oscillations of Stars/Microvariabilité et Oscillations STellaire (MOST), was Canada's first space telescope. Up until nearly 10 years after its launch it was also the smallest space telescope in orbit (for which its creators nicknamed it the "Humble Space Telescope", in reference to one of the largest, the Hubble). MOST was the first spacecraft dedicated to the study of asteroseismology, subsequently followed by the now-completed CoRoT and Kepler missions. It was also the first Canadian science satellite launched since ISIS II, 32 years previously.

== Description ==
As its name suggests, its primary mission was to monitor variations in star light, which it did by observing a single target for a long period of time (up to 60 days). Typically, larger space telescopes cannot afford to remain focused on a single target for so long due to the demand for their resources.

At 53 kg (117 lb), 60 cm (24 in) wide and tall, and 24 cm (9 in) deep, it was the size and weight of a small chest or an extra-large suitcase filled with electronics. This places it in the microsatellite category.

MOST was developed as a joint effort of the Canadian Space Agency (CSA), Dynacon Enterprises Limited (now Microsatellite Systems Canada Inc), the Space Flight Laboratory (SFL) of the University of Toronto, Institute for Aerospace Studies (ISTS), and the University of British Columbia (UBC). The original application to the CSA was developed by a large team led by Slavek Rucinski at the ISTS (available as a 42-page book at https://www.astro.utoronto.ca/~rucinski/MOST_proposal_1997.pdf), In 1997, ISTS ceased to be supported by the province of Ontario and the leadership was transferred to Jaymie Matthews at UBC. The novel feature was the rapid, strictly continunuous photometry of stars facilitated by the special dusk-dawn, Sun-synchronous orbit permitting high quality asteroseismology for up to 2 months, to help date the age of the universe, and to search for stellar eclipses by extrasolar planets.

MOST featured an instrument comprising a visible-light dual-CCD camera, fed by a 15-cm aperture Maksutov telescope. One CCD gathered science images, while the other provided images used by star-tracking software that, along with a set of four reaction wheels (computer-controlled motorized flywheels that are similar to gyroscopes) maintained pointing with an error of less than 1 arc-second, better pointing by far than any other microsatellite to date.

The design of the rest of MOST was inspired by and based on microsatellite bus designs pioneered by AMSAT, and first brought to commercial viability by the microsatellite company SSTL (based at the University of Surrey in the United Kingdom); during the early stages of MOST development, the core group of AMSAT microsatellite satellite designers advised and mentored the MOST satellite design team, via a know-how transfer arrangement with UTIAS. This approach to satellite design is notable for making use of commercial-grade electronics, along with a "small team," "early prototyping" engineering development approach rather different from that used in most other space-engineering programs, to achieve relatively very low costs: MOST's life-cycle cost (design, build, launch and operate) was less than $10 million in Canadian funds (about 7 million Euros or 6 million USD, at exchange rates at time of launch).

== Operation history ==
Development of the satellite was managed by the Canadian Space Agency's Space Science Branch, and was funded under its Small Payloads Program; its operations were (as of 2012) managed by the CSA's Space Exploration Branch. It was operated by SFL (where the primary MOST ground station is located) jointly with Microsat Systems Canada Inc. (since the sale of Dynacon's space division to MSCI in 2008). As of ten years after launch, despite failures of two of its components (one of the four reaction wheels and one of the two CCD driver boards), the satellite was still operating well, as a result of both on-going on-board software upgrades as well as built-in hardware redundancy, allowing improvements to performance and to reconfigure around failed hardware units.

In 2008, the MOST Satellite Project Team won the Canadian Aeronautics and Space Institute's Alouette Award, which recognizes outstanding contributions to advancement in Canadian space technology, applications, science or engineering.

=== Termination of operations funding by CSA ===
On 30 April 2014, the Canadian Space Agency announced that funding to continue operating MOST would be withdrawn as of 9 September 2014, apparently as a result of funding cuts to the Canadian Space Agency's budget by the Harper government, despite the fact that the satellite continues to be fully operational and capable of making on-going science observations. P.I. Jaymie Matthews responded by saying that "he will consider all options to keep the satellite in orbit, and that includes a direct appeal to the public."

=== Post-CSA-funded operations ===
In October 2014, the MOST Satellite was acquired by MSCI, which then commenced commercial operation of the satellite, offering a variety of potential uses including continuing the original MOST mission in partnership with Dr. Matthews, but also other planetary studies, attitude control system algorithm R&D, and Earth observation. MOST was finally decommissioned in March 2019, after an apparent failure of its power subsystem.

== Discoveries ==
The MOST team has reported a number of discoveries. In 2004 they reported that the star Procyon does not oscillate to the extent that had been expected, although this has been disputed.

In 2006 observations revealed a previously unknown class of variable stars, the "slowly pulsating B supergiants" (SPBsg). In 2011, MOST detected transits by exoplanet 55 Cancri e of its primary star, based on two weeks of nearly continuous photometric monitoring, confirming an earlier detection of this planet, and allowing investigations into the planet's composition. In 2019, MOST photometry was used to disprove claims of permanent starspots on the surface of HD 189733 A that were alleged to be caused by interactions between the magnetic fields of the star and its "hot Jupiter" exoplanet.

== MOST target campaigns ==
- Procyon
- HD 209458 b
- HD 163899 (guide star)
- 55 Cancri e
- HIP 116454 b

== See also ==
- Asteroseismology – Study of oscillations in stars
