= List of spaceflight launches in July–September 2026 =

This article lists orbital and suborbital launches during the third quarter of the year 2026.

For all other spaceflight activities, see 2026 in spaceflight. For launches during the rest of 2026, see List of spaceflight launches in January–March 2026, List of spaceflight launches in April–June 2026, and List of spaceflight launches in October–December 2026.

== Orbital launches ==
- ← Jan
- Feb
- Mar
- Apr
- May
- Jun
- Jul
- Aug
- Sep
- Oct
- Nov
- Dec →

=== July ===
Date and time (UTC)	Rocket	Flight number	Launch site		LSP	
Date and time (UTC)	Payload (⚀ = CubeSat)	Operator	Orbit	Function	Decay (UTC)	Outcome
Date and time (UTC)	Remarks					
1 July; 23:46:00	(China) Long March 4B	4B-Y?	(China) Jiuquan SLS-2		(China) CASC	
1 July; 23:46:00	(China) HaiYang-2E	Ministry of Natural Resources	Low Earth (SSO)	Oceanography	In orbit	Operational
2 July; 02:58:00	(United States) Falcon 9 Block 5	Starlink Group 17-46	(United States) Vandenberg SLC-4E		(United States) SpaceX	
2 July; 02:58:00	(United States) Starlink × 24	SpaceX	Low Earth (SSO)	Communications	In orbit	Operational
2 July; 04:24:00	(United States) Atlas V 551	LA-08/Leo-8	(United States) Cape Canaveral SLC-41		(United States) ULA	
2 July; 04:24:00	(United States) LeoSat × 29	Amazon Leo	Low Earth	Communications	In orbit	Operational
2 July; 04:24:00	Final flight of Atlas V in the 551 configuration. Final flight of an Atlas V with a 5-meter fairing and last use of Single Engine Centaur III upper stage. Last of nine Amazon Leo launches on Atlas V.					
3 July; 08:36:00	(United States) Pegasus XL		(Marshall Islands) Stargazer, Kwajalein Atoll		(United States) Northrop Grumman	
3 July; 08:36:00	(United States) LINK	NASA/Katalyst Space Technologies	Low Earth	Reboost	In orbit	Operational
3 July; 08:36:00	Swift rescue mission will capture and reposition NASA's Neil Gehrels Swift Observatory by raising it to a higher altitude. 46th and final launch of an air-launched Pegasus rocket.					
4 July; 09:30:00	(China) Long March 6A	6A-Y25	(China) Taiyuan LA-9A		(China) CASC	
4 July; 09:30:00	(China) Qianfan × 18	SSST	Low Earth (Polar)	Communications	In orbit	Operational
5 July; 10:50:00	(United States) Falcon 9 Block 5	Starlink Group 10-50	(United States) Cape Canaveral SLC-40		(United States) SpaceX	
5 July; 10:50:00	(United States) Starlink × 29	SpaceX	Low Earth	Communications	In orbit	Operational
5 July; 10:50:00	On board the Falcon 9 first stage booster were two Fabships from Besxar, two pilot reusable manufacturing pods, to test their ability to withstand launch and re-entry environments, kicking off a series of flight tests supporting Besxar's development efforts.					
5 July; 13:43	(China) Long March 8A	8-Y9	(China) Wenchang Commercial LC-1		(China) CASC	
5 July; 13:43	(China) Qianfan × 20	SSST	Low Earth (Polar)	Communications	In orbit	Operational
7 July; 07:12:00	(United States) Falcon 9 Block 5	Transporter-17	(United States) Vandenberg SLC-4E		(United States) SpaceX	
7 July; 07:12:00	(South Korea) CAS500-4	KARI / Ministry of Science and ICT / Ministry of Environment	Low Earth (SSO)	Earth observation	In orbit	Operational
7 July; 07:12:00	(Italy) ION SCV Joyful Julia	D-Orbit	Low Earth (SSO)	Space Tug	In orbit	Operational
7 July; 07:12:00	(Canada) EarthDaily-8	EarthDaily	Low Earth (SSO)	Earth observation	In orbit	Operational
7 July; 07:12:00	(Japan) GRUS-3 × 7	Axelspace	Low Earth (SSO)	Earth observation	In orbit	Operational
7 July; 07:12:00	(Finland) ICEYE-X77, 79, 80, 81	ICEYE	Low Earth (SSO)	Earth observation	In orbit	Operational
7 July; 07:12:00	(Poland) PIRX-1	Ministry of National Defence	Low Earth (SSO)	Earth observation	In orbit	Operational
7 July; 07:12:00	(United States) FireSat 1, 2, 3	Earth Fire Alliance	Low Earth (SSO)	Wildfire detection	In orbit	Operational
7 July; 07:12:00	(United States) MISR-D 1, 2	SOCOM	Low Earth (SSO)	Technology demonstration	In orbit	Operational
7 July; 07:12:00	(United States) Pelican-11	Planet Labs	Low Earth (SSO)	Earth observation	In orbit	Operational
7 July; 07:12:00	(Greece) Hyperion GR 1	ELKED/OCOSA	Low Earth (SSO)	Earth observation	In orbit	Operational
7 July; 07:12:00	(Japan) KITA-36, 53	Sony SCC	Low Earth (SSO)	Technology demonstration	In orbit	Operational
7 July; 07:12:00	(United States) Anduril-216 (LA3 ?)	Apex	Low Earth (SSO)	Technology demonstration	In orbit	Operational
7 July; 07:12:00	(United States) Argonaut Demo	Argo Space	Low Earth (SSO)	Technology demonstration	In orbit	Operational
7 July; 07:12:00	⚀ CyberCUBE	ESA	Low Earth (SSO)	Technology demonstration	In orbit	Operational
7 July; 07:12:00	⚀ (Czech Republic) KOSTKA	Brno University of Technology	Low Earth (SSO)	Technology demonstration	In orbit	Operational
7 July; 07:12:00	⚀ (Bulgaria) Balkan-3	EnduroSat	Low Earth (SSO)	Earth observation	In orbit	Operational
7 July; 07:12:00	⚀ (Spain) FOSSAST2E-26	FOSSA Systems	Low Earth (SSO)	Internet of Things connectivity	In orbit	Operational
7 July; 07:12:00	⚀ (United States) GENIE N2-P-Body	NOVI Space, Inc.	Low Earth (SSO)	Technology demonstration	In orbit	Operational
7 July; 07:12:00	⚀ (France) BRO-31	Unseenlabs	Low Earth (SSO)	SIGINT	In orbit	Operational
7 July; 07:12:00	⚀ (Slovakia) MARINA	Satellites with Meaning	Low Earth (SSO)	TBA	In orbit	Operational
7 July; 07:12:00	⚀ (United States) BOHR	City Labs	Low Earth (SSO)	Betavoltaic battery technology demonstration	In orbit	Operational
7 July; 07:12:00	⚀ (United States) Lemur-2 × 10	Spire Global	Low Earth (SSO)	Earth observation	In orbit	Operational
7 July; 07:12:00	⚀ (Australia) Centauri 9	Fleet Space	Low Earth (SSO)	IoT	In orbit	Operational
7 July; 07:12:00	⚀ (United States) R5-S9	NASA	Low Earth (SSO)	Technology demonstration	In orbit	Operational
7 July; 07:12:00	⚀ (Austria) Oasis Alpha	Tumbleweed	Low Earth (SSO)	Technology demonstration	In orbit	Operational
7 July; 07:12:00	⚀ (Turkey) RAFS Cubesat	Turkish Space Agency	Low Earth (SSO)	Technology demonstration	In orbit	Operational
7 July; 07:12:00	⚀ (Chile) SUCHAI 4	University of Chile	Low Earth (SSO)	Ionospheric research	In orbit	Operational
7 July; 07:12:00	⚀ (Israel) CloudCT-Precursor	TECN	Low Earth (SSO)	Technology demonstration	In orbit	Operational
7 July; 07:12:00	⚀ (Germany) CuBy × 5	CuBy consortium	Low Earth (SSO)	Earth observation	In orbit	Operational
7 July; 07:12:00	⚀ (Germany) TOM-1, 2, 3	TOM consortium	Low Earth (SSO)	Earth observation	In orbit	Operational
7 July; 07:12:00	▫ (United States) ET-001A, B, C, D	TBA	Low Earth (SSO)	TBA	In orbit	Operational
7 July; 07:12:00	⚀ (United States) GRITSS	NASA	Low Earth (SSO)	Technology demonstration	In orbit	Operational
7 July; 07:12:00	⚀ (United States) SPEAR-1A, 1B, 1C	United States Naval Research Laboratory	Low Earth (SSO)	Technology demonstration	In orbit	Operational
7 July; 07:12:00	⚀ (United States) MAVERIC	USC	Low Earth (SSO)	Technology demonstration	In orbit	Operational
7 July; 07:12:00	⚀ (Taiwan) SCION-X	National Central University	Low Earth (SSO)	Ionospheric research	In orbit	Operational
7 July; 07:12:00	⚀ (Taiwan) KOYO	National Central University	Low Earth (SSO)	Technology demonstration	In orbit	Operational
7 July; 07:12:00	⚀ (Poland) Replicator-2	Orbital Matter	Low Earth (SSO)	Technology demonstration	In orbit	Operational
7 July; 07:12:00	⚀ SPEL	TBA	Low Earth (SSO)	TBA	In orbit	Operational
7 July; 07:12:00	⚀ (Spain) Posidònia	Open Cosmos	Low Earth (SSO)	TBA	In orbit	Operational
7 July; 07:12:00	⚀ Nova 1	TBA	Low Earth (SSO)	TBA	In orbit	Operational
7 July; 07:12:00	⚀ LEONAV-1	TBA	Low Earth (SSO)	TBA	In orbit	Operational
7 July; 07:12:00	⚀ MARMOTSat	TBA	Low Earth (SSO)	TBA	In orbit	Operational
7 July; 07:12:00	⚀ (United States) IPoS-TDsM	Apolink	Low Earth (SSO)	Technology demonstration	In orbit	Operational
7 July; 07:12:00	⚀ (Portugal) Lusíada 5, 6, 7	LusoSpace	Low Earth (SSO)	TBA	In orbit	Operational
7 July; 07:12:00	⚀ Sentinel 1 (OSIRIS A)	TBA	Low Earth (SSO)	TBA	In orbit	Operational
7 July; 07:12:00	Dedicated SmallSat Rideshare mission carrying 81 payloads to sun-synchronous orbit, designated Transporter-17. Space NTK's MAGOKORO space burial payload was hosted on this launch.					
9 July; 09:25:43	(United States) Falcon 9 Block 5	Starlink Group 10-42	(United States) Cape Canaveral SLC-40		(United States) SpaceX	
9 July; 09:25:43	(United States) Starlink × 29	SpaceX	Low Earth	Communications	In orbit	Operational
10 July; 04:15:00	(China) Long March 10B	10B-X1	(China) Wenchang Commercial LC-2		(China) CASC	
10 July; 04:15:00	(China) Hulianwang Jishu Shiyan		Low Earth	Communications	In orbit	Operational
10 July; 04:15:00	Maiden flight of Long March 10B. First successful first stage recovery by China. First ever stage recovery by a cable-net recovery system.					
11 July; 03:01	(United States) Falcon 9 Block 5	Starlink Group 17-48	(United States) Vandenberg SLC-4E		(United States) SpaceX	
11 July; 03:01	(United States) Starlink × 24	SpaceX	Low Earth (SSO)	Communications	In orbit	Operational
14 July; 01:28:17	(United States) Falcon 9 Block 5	Starlink Group 15-14	(United States) Vandenberg SLC-4E		(United States) SpaceX	
14 July; 01:28:17	(United States) Starlink × 27	SpaceX	Low Earth	Communications	In orbit	Operational
14 July; 09:10:12	(United States) Falcon 9 Block 5	Starlink Group 10-45	(United States) Cape Canaveral SLC-40		(United States) SpaceX	
14 July; 09:10:12	(United States) Starlink × 29	SpaceX	Low Earth	Communications	In orbit	Operational
14 July; 09:10:12	600th launch of Falcon 9 rocket.					
14 July; 14:47:43	(Russia) Soyuz-2.1a		(Kazakhstan) Baikonur Site 31/6		(Russia) Roscosmos	
14 July; 14:47:43	(Russia) Soyuz MS-29	Roscosmos	Low Earth (ISS)	Expedition 74/75	In orbit	Docked to ISS
16 July; 20:32:36	(United States) Falcon 9 Block 5	F9-666	(United States) Vandenberg SLC-4E		(United States) SpaceX	
16 July; 20:32:36	(United States) T1TL-E × 21	SDA	Low Earth (Polar)	Military communications	In orbit	Operational
16 July; 20:32:36	Third of six launches for the Space Development Agency's Transport Layer Tranche 1 (T1TL-E).					
18 July; 06:35:30	(India) Vikram-I	Aagaman	(India) Satish Dhawan FLP		(India) Skyroot Aerospace	
18 July; 06:35:30	⚀ (India) SCOPE	Skyroot Aerospace	Low Earth	TBA	In orbit	Operational
18 July; 06:35:30	▫ (India) SOLARAS S3	Grahaa Space	Low Earth	TBA	In orbit	Operational
18 July; 06:35:30	Maiden flight of Vikram-I. Cosmoserve Space's robotic arm Embrace and an On-orbit demonstration from DCUBED is hosted on the upper stage of this mission.					
19 July	(Russia) Soyuz-2.1b		(Russia) Plesetsk Site 43		(Russia) Bureau 1440	
19 July	(Russia) Rassvet × 16	Bureau 1440	Low Earth (SSO)	Communications	In orbit	Operational
21 July; 14:49:34	(United States) Falcon 9 Block 5	Starlink Group 17-39	(United States) Vandenberg SLC-4E		(United States) SpaceX	
21 July; 14:49:34	(United States) Starlink × 24	SpaceX	Low Earth (SSO)	Communications	In orbit	Operational
21 July; 14:49:34	First launch attempt on July 20 was aborted at T-0 seconds immediately after ignition. The launch was rescheduled for July 21.					
21 July; 21:15:00	(United States) Falcon 9 Block 5	F9-668	(United States) Cape Canaveral SLC-40		(United States) SpaceX	
21 July; 21:15:00	(United States) MRV-1	Northrop Grumman / DARPA	Geosynchronous	Satellite servicing	In orbit	Operational
21 July; 21:15:00	(United States) MEP × 3	Northrop Grumman	Geosynchronous	Satellite servicing	In orbit	Operational
21 July; 21:15:00	Falcon 9 First Stage Booster (B1069) will be expended on this mission. The Mission Robotic Vehicle (MRV) will carry DARPA's Robotic Servicing of Geosynchronous Spacecraft (RSGS) Robotic Payload. It will install three propulsion jet packs, referred to as Mission Extension Pods (MEP), on satellites that are nearing the end of their operational lifespans. Two of the three MEPs will be installed on Optus D3 and an Intelsat satellite.					
22 July; 02:54:00	(China) Gravity-1		Special Launch Platform, East China Sea		(China) Orienspace	
22 July; 02:54:00	(China) Dongpo 13 and 14		Low Earth (SSO)	Earth observation	In orbit	Operational
22 July; 02:54:00	(China) Dongpo 17 to 20		Low Earth (SSO)	Earth observation	In orbit	Operational
22 July; 02:54:00	(China) Xiguang 2-01		Low Earth (SSO)	Earth observation	In orbit	Operational
22 July; 02:54:00	(China) Tianyi 49		Low Earth (SSO)	Earth observation	In orbit	Operational
22 July; 02:54:00	(China) Zidingxiang 3		Low Earth (SSO)	Technology demonstration	In orbit	Operational
23 July; 12:00:00	(China) Long March 3B/E		(China) Xichang LC-2		(China) CASC	
23 July; 12:00:00	(China) Tianlian II-06	CAST	Geosynchronous	Communications	In orbit	Operational
23 July; 23:33:00	(China) Kinetica 1	Y15	(China) Jiuquan LS-130		(China) CAS Space	
23 July; 23:33:00	(China) Tianyi 48		Low Earth (SSO)	Earth observation	In orbit	Operational
23 July; 23:33:00	(China) Gande 1-01		Low Earth (SSO)	Space debris modeling	In orbit	Operational
23 July; 23:33:00	(China) Xiguang 2-03		Low Earth (SSO)	Earth observation	In orbit	Operational
23 July; 23:33:00	(China) Jitianxing A-04		Low Earth (SSO)	Earth observation	In orbit	Operational
23 July; 23:33:00	(China) Yinglong Fengguang 01		Low Earth (SSO)	Earth observation	In orbit	Operational
25 July; 15:51:00	(United States) Falcon 9 Block 5	Starlink Group 17-51	(United States) Vandenberg SLC-4E		(United States) SpaceX	
25 July; 15:51:00	(United States) Starlink × 24	SpaceX	Low Earth (SSO)	Communications	In orbit	Operational
29 July; 11:50:00	(China) Long March 7A		(China) Wenchang LC-2		(China) CASC	
29 July; 11:50:00	(China) Tianlian III-01	CAST	Geosynchronous	Communications	In orbit	Operational
30 July; 01:00:00	(China) Long March 6A		(China) Taiyuan LA-9A		(China) CASC	
30 July; 01:00:00	(China) Tongxin Jishu Shiyan 27A-B	TBA	Low Earth	TBA	In orbit	Operational
30 July; 07:10:19	(United States) Falcon 9 Block 5	F9-670	(United States) Cape Canaveral SLC-40		(United States) SpaceX	
30 July; 07:10:19	(United States) USA-619 (Intruder F/O-4)	NRO	Low Earth	TBA	In orbit	Operational
30 July; 07:10:19	NROL-95 Mission.					

- ← Jan
- Feb
- Mar
- Apr
- May
- Jun
- Jul
- Aug
- Sep
- Oct
- Nov
- Dec →

=== August ===
Date and time (UTC)	Rocket	Flight number	Launch site		LSP	
Date and time (UTC)	Payload (⚀ = CubeSat)	Operator	Orbit	Function	Decay (UTC)	Outcome
Date and time (UTC)	Remarks					
1 August; 03:08:43	(United States) Falcon 9 Block 5	Starlink Group 17-52	(United States) Vandenberg SLC-4E		(United States) SpaceX	
1 August; 03:08:43	(United States) Starlink × 24	SpaceX	Low Earth (SSO)	Communications	In orbit	Operational
4 August; 08:52:00	(China) Long March 8A		(China) Wenchang Commercial LC-1		(China) CASC	
4 August; 08:52:00	(China) SatNet LEO Group 23	TBA	Low Earth	Communications	In orbit	Operational
4 August; 17:05:03	(United States) Falcon 9 Block 5	Starlink Group 17-53	(United States) Vandenberg SLC-4E		(United States) SpaceX	
4 August; 17:05:03	(United States) Starlink × 24	SpaceX	Low Earth (SSO)	Communications	In orbit	Operational
5 August; 02:38:00	(China) Jielong 3		(China) Dong Fang Hang Tian Gang platform, Yellow Sea		China Rocket	
5 August; 02:38:00	(Indonesia) Lampung-1 (OSE HS-01)	STAR.VISION	Low Earth (SSO)	Earth observation	In orbit	Operational
5 August; 02:38:00	(Uzbekistan) Samarkand 2028 (OSE HS-02)	Uzcosmos	Low Earth (SSO)	Earth observation	In orbit	Operational
5 August; 07:49:40	(United States) Falcon 9 Block 5	F9-673	(United States) Cape Canaveral SLC-40		(United States) SpaceX	
5 August; 07:49:40	(United States) BlueBird 11	AST SpaceMobile	Low Earth	Communications	In orbit	Operational
5 August; 07:49:40	(United States) BlueBird 12	AST SpaceMobile	Low Earth	Communications	In orbit	Operational
5 August; 07:49:40	(United States) BlueBird 13	AST SpaceMobile	Low Earth	Communications	In orbit	Operational
6 August; 09:18:25	(United States) Electron	The Grain Goddess Provides	(New Zealand) Mahia LC-1A		(United States) Rocket Lab	
6 August; 09:18:25	(Japan) QPS-SAR-13 (MIKURA-I)	iQPS	Low Earth	Earth observation	In orbit	Operational
6 August; 09:18:25	Seventh of 11 dedicated launches to support the build-out of iQPS’ planned constellation of 36 synthetic aperture radar (SAR) satellites.					
8 August; 16:35:02	(United States) Falcon 9 Block 5	Starlink Group 17-38	(United States) Vandenberg SLC-4E		(United States) SpaceX	
8 August; 16:35:02	(United States) Starlink × 24	SpaceX	Low Earth (SSO)	Communications	In orbit	Operational
10 August; 12:02:00	(China) Long March 7A	7A-Y?	(China) Wenchang LC-2		(China) CASC	
10 August; 12:02:00	(China) ChinaSat 4B (ST-3B)	China Satcom	Geosynchronous	Military communications	10 August	Launch failure
10 August; 12:02:00	Launch vehicle disintegrated when passing around Max-Q.					
10 August; 19:23:31	(Japan) H3-22S	F9	(Japan) Tanegashima LA-Y2		(Japan) JAXA	
10 August; 19:23:31	(Japan) QZS-7 (Michibiki-7)	CAO	GTO to Geosynchronous	Navigation	In orbit	Operational
10 August; 19:23:31	QZS-7 carries a USSF SĀCHI Space Situational Awareness payload. Quasi-geostationary (slight incline and eccentricity) orbit.					
11 August; 14:26:00	(United States) Falcon 9 Block 5	Starlink Group 10-19	(United States) Cape Canaveral SLC-40		(United States) SpaceX	
11 August; 14:26:00	(United States) Starlink × 29	SpaceX	Low Earth	Communications	In orbit	Operational
12 August; 02:00:00	(United States) Falcon 9 Block 5	Starlink Group 17-49	(United States) Vandenberg SLC-4E		(United States) SpaceX	
12 August; 02:00:00	(United States) Starlink × 24	SpaceX	Low Earth (SSO)	Communications	In orbit	Operational
16 August; 01:12:14	(United States) Falcon 9 Block 5		(United States) Cape Canaveral SLC-40		(United States) SpaceX	
16 August; 01:12:14	(United States) Globalstar-2R × 8	Globalstar	Low Earth	Communications	In orbit	Operational
16 August; 01:12:14	Launch of eight 2nd generation refresh satellites to replenish the existing constellation.					
16 August; 01:50:45	(United States) Falcon 9 Block 5		(United States) Vandenberg SLC-4E		(United States) SpaceX	
16 August; 01:50:45	(United States) USA-620 - USA-642 (Starshield Group 1-14)	U.S. Space Force	Low Earth	TBA	In orbit	Operational
16 August; 01:50:45	USSF-366 (SBST R-1) mission. First of 18 planned missions for the USSF's Space Based Sensing and Targeting (SBST) portfolio. 23 Modified Starshields, suspected to be part of the new Starshield-based Space Data Network Backbone.					
16 August; 21:10:00	(China) Long March 12		(China) Wenchang Commercial LC-2		(China) CASC	
16 August; 21:10:00	(China) SatNet LEO Group 24	TBA	Low Earth	Communications	In orbit	Operational
17 August; 03:02:00	(China) Long March 2C		(China) Taiyuan Satellite Launch Center LA-9		(China) CALT	
17 August; 03:02:00	(United Arab Emirates) SEO	TBA	Low Earth (SSO)	Earth observation	In orbit	Operational
18 August; 23:35	(China) Zhuque-3	Y2	(China) Jiuquan LS-96		(China) LandSpace	
18 August; 23:35	(China) Honghu-03	TBA	Low Earth	TBA	In orbit	Operational
18 August; 23:35	Second launch of Zhuque-3. Successful first stage recovery on land using landing legs for the first time by China.					
19 August; 04:01:07	(United States) Falcon 9 Block 5	Starlink Group 17-50	(United States) Vandenberg SLC-4E		(United States) SpaceX	
19 August; 04:01:07	(United States) Starlink × 24	SpaceX	Low Earth (SSO)	Communications	In orbit	Operational
20 August; 13:00	(United States) Electron	The Lightning God Defends	(New Zealand) Mahia LC-1A		(United States) Rocket Lab	
20 August; 13:00	(Japan) QPS-SAR-18	iQPS	Low Earth	Earth observation	In orbit	Operational
20 August; 13:00	Eighth of 17 dedicated launches to support the build-out of iQPS’ planned constellation of 36 synthetic aperture radar (SAR) satellites.					
21 August; 15:14:22	(United States) Falcon 9 Block 5	Starlink Group 10-39	(United States) Cape Canaveral SLC-40		(United States) SpaceX	
21 August; 15:14:22	(United States) Starlink × 29	SpaceX	Low Earth	Communications	In orbit	Operational
22 August; 07:25:00	(United States) Falcon 9 Block 5	Starlink Group 15-20	(United States) Vandenberg SLC-4E		(United States) SpaceX	
22 August; 07:25:00	(United States) Starlink × 27	SpaceX	Low Earth	Communications	In orbit	Operational
24 August; 02:40:00	(Russia) Soyuz-2.1b/Fregat-M		(Russia) Plesetsk Site 43/3		(Russia) RVSN RF	
24 August; 02:40:00	(Russia) GLONASS-K 19L (K1 №7)	VKS	Medium Earth	Navigation	In orbit	Operational
25 August; 03:21	(China) Long March 6C	Y1	(China) Taiyuan LA-9A		(China) CASC	
25 August; 03:21	(China) BaYi-04	TBA	Low Earth	TBA	In orbit	Operational
25 August; 03:21	(China) JingAn MengXiang-01	TBA	Low Earth	TBA	In orbit	Operational
25 August; 03:21	(China) Lingzhi-09	GISTDA	Low Earth	TBA	In orbit	Operational
25 August; 03:21	(China) Zhongke-14	TBA	Low Earth	TBA	In orbit	Operational
25 August; 03:21	(China) Zhongke-15	TBA	Low Earth	TBA	In orbit	Operational
25 August; 03:21	(China) Muduo-1A	BNU	Low Earth	TBA	In orbit	Operational
25 August; 03:21	(China) Muduo-1B	BNU	Low Earth	TBA	In orbit	Operational
25 August; 09:33:38	(United States) Falcon 9 Block 5	Starlink Group 10-49	(United States) Cape Canaveral SLC-40		(United States) SpaceX	
25 August; 09:33:38	(United States) Starlink × 29	SpaceX	Low Earth	Communications	In orbit	Operational
25 August; 09:33:38	Falcon 9 First Stage Booster (B1067) became the first booster to launch 37 missions. This also was the final Falcon 9 Starlink launch from Florida, with future Starlink missions out of Florida set to fly on Starship.					
26 August; 09:35:11	(United States) Falcon 9 Block 5	Starlink Group 15-22	(United States) Vandenberg SLC-4E		(United States) SpaceX	
26 August; 09:35:11	(United States) Starlink × 27	SpaceX	Low Earth	Communications	In orbit	Operational
27 August; 20:10:00	(France) Ariane 62		(France) Kourou ELA-4		(France) Arianespace	
27 August; 20:10:00	MTG-I2 (Meteosat-14)	EUMETSAT	Geosynchronous	Meteorology	In orbit	Operational
30 August; 11:26:00	(United States) Falcon Heavy		(United States) Kennedy LC-39A		(United States) SpaceX	
30 August; 11:26:00	(United States) Nancy Grace Roman Space Telescope	NASA	Sun–Earth L_{2}	Infrared astronomy	In orbit	Operational
30 August; 11:26:00	Formerly known as the Wide-Field Infrared Survey Telescope (WFIRST).					

- ← Jan
- Feb
- Mar
- Apr
- May
- Jun
- Jul
- Aug
- Sep
- Oct
- Nov
- Dec →

=== September ===
Date and time (UTC)	Rocket	Flight number	Launch site		LSP	
Date and time (UTC)	Payload (⚀ = CubeSat)	Operator	Orbit	Function	Decay (UTC)	Outcome
Date and time (UTC)	Remarks					
1 September; 02:00	(China) Pallas-1	Y1	(China) Jiuquan Galactic Energy Exclusive Launchpad		(China) Galactic Energy	
1 September; 02:00			Low Earth (SSO)	Boilerplate	1 September	Success
1 September; 02:00	First launch of Pallas-1. Successful demo flight with boilerplate payload.					
2 September; 08:42:12	(United States) Falcon 9 Block 5	Starlink Group 15-23	(United States) Vandenberg SLC-4E		(United States) SpaceX	
2 September; 08:42:12	(United States) Starlink × 27	SpaceX	Low Earth	Communications	In orbit	Operational
2 September; 12:01:00	(United States) Electron	Owl Around The World	(New Zealand) Mahia LC-1A		(United States) Rocket Lab	
2 September; 12:01:00	(Japan) StriX-9	Synspective	Low Earth	Earth observation	In orbit	Operational
3 September; 21:25:00	(India) GSLV Mk II	F17	(India) Satish Dhawan SLP		(India) ISRO	
3 September; 21:25:00	(India) EOS-05 (GISAT-1A)	ISRO	GTO to Geosynchronous	Earth observation	In orbit	Operational
3 September; 21:25:00	EOS-05 will replace EOS-03, which was lost in a launch failure in 2021.					
5 September; 20:12:00	(Germany) Spectrum	Onward and Upward	(Norway) Andøya		(Germany) Isar Aerospace	
5 September; 20:12:00	⚀ (Germany) CyBEEsat	TU Berlin	Low Earth (SSO)	TBA	In orbit	Operational
5 September; 20:12:00	⚀ (Norway) FramSat-1	NTNU	Low Earth (SSO)	TBA	In orbit	Operational
5 September; 20:12:00	⚀ (Bulgaria) Platform 6	EnduroSat	Low Earth (SSO)	TBA	In orbit	Operational
5 September; 20:12:00	⚀ (Austria) SpaceTeamSat1	TU Wien Space Team	Low Earth (SSO)	TBA	In orbit	Operational
5 September; 20:12:00	⚀ (Slovenia) TriSat-S	University of Maribor	Low Earth (SSO)	TBA	In orbit	Operational
5 September; 20:12:00	Second flight of the Isar Aerospace Spectrum launch vehicle. This launch carried five cubesats, and the Dcubed's "Let It Go" payload, as part of European Space Agency (ESA)'s "Boost!" program.					
6 September; 14:26:54	(United States) Falcon 9 Block 5	Starlink Group 15-24	(United States) Vandenberg SLC-4E		(United States) SpaceX	
6 September; 14:26:54	(United States) Starlink × 27	SpaceX	Low Earth	Communications	In orbit	Operational
9 September; 09:00:00	(China) Long March 4B	4B-Y?	(China) Jiuquan SLS-2		(China) CASC	
9 September; 09:00:00	(China) Yaogan 53-01	TBA	Low Earth	Reconnaissance	In orbit	Operational
9 September; 09:00:00	(China) Yaogan 53-02	TBA	Low Earth	Reconnaissance	In orbit	Operational
9 September; 09:00:00	(China) Yaogan 53-03	TBA	Low Earth	Reconnaissance	In orbit	Operational
9 September; 09:00:00	(China) Yaogan 56-01	TBA	Low Earth	Reconnaissance	In orbit	Operational
9 September; 09:00:00	(China) Yaogan 56-02	TBA	Low Earth	Reconnaissance	In orbit	Operational
9 September; 09:00:00	(China) Yaogan 56-03	TBA	Low Earth	Reconnaissance	In orbit	Operational
10 September; 15:37:00	(United States) Falcon 9 Block 5		(United States) Vandenberg SLC-4E		(United States) SpaceX	
10 September; 15:37:00	(United States) USA-644 - USA-666 (Starshield Group 1-15)	United States Space Force	TBD	TBD	In orbit	Operational
10 September; 15:37:00	USSF-153 (SBST R-2) mission. Second of 18 planned missions for the USSF's Space Based Sensing and Targeting (SBST) portfolio. 23 Modified Starshields, suspected to be part of the new Starshield-based Space Data Network Backbone.					
11 September; 03:28	(United States) Electron		(New Zealand) Mahia LC-1A		(United States) Rocket Lab	
11 September; 03:28	(United States) BlackSky Global 36	BlackSky Global	Low Earth	Earth observation	In orbit	Operational
11 September; 03:28	This mission is named "Happily Ever Faster".					
13 September; 18:50:00	(United States) Falcon 9 Block 5		(United States) Cape Canaveral SLC-40		(United States) SpaceX	
13 September; 18:50:00	(Luxembourg) O3b mPOWER 11 (O3b FM31)	SES S.A.	Medium Earth	Communications	In orbit	Operational
13 September; 18:50:00	(Luxembourg) O3b mPOWER 12 (O3b FM32)	SES S.A.	Medium Earth	Communications	In orbit	Operational
13 September; 18:50:00	(Luxembourg) O3b mPOWER 13 (O3b FM33)	SES S.A.	Medium Earth	Communications	In orbit	Operational
15 September; 06:21:07	(Italy) Vega-C		(France) Kourou ELV		(France) Arianespace	
15 September; 06:21:07	Sentinel-3C	EUMETSAT	Low Earth (SSO)	Earth observation	In orbit	Operational
15 September; 06:21:07	FLEX	ESA	Low Earth (SSO)	Earth observation	In orbit	Operational
15 September; 06:26	(China) Zhuque-2E	Y7	(China) Jiuquan Dongfeng Zone		(China) LandSpace	
15 September; 06:26	(China) Spacesail × 10	Shanghai Spacecom Satellite Technology	Low Earth (SSO)	Communications	In orbit	Operational
15 September; 06:26	G60 Polar Constellation Group 19					
15 September; 22:00	(China) Gravity-1	Y3	East China Sea		(China) Orienspace	
15 September; 22:00	(China) Spacesail × 8	Shanghai Spacecom Satellite Technology	Low Earth (SSO)	Communications	In orbit	Operational
15 September; 22:00	(China) EUHT Technology Demonstration Satellite	TBA	Low Earth (SSO)	Technology demonstration	In orbit	Operational
15 September; 22:00	A technology demonstration satellite, together with G60 Polar Constellation Group 26.					
16 September; 13:33:54	(Russia) Soyuz-2.1b		(Kazakhstan) Baikonur Site 31/6		(Russia) Roscosmos	
16 September; 13:33:54	(Russia) Progress MS-35/96P	Roscosmos	Low Earth (ISS)	ISS logistics	In orbit	Docked to ISS
16 September; 13:33:54	First flight of the Soyuz-2.1b variant with Progress MS spacecraft .					
17 September; 00:32:00	(China) Long March 12		(China) Wenchang Commercial LC-2		(China) CASC	
17 September; 00:32:00	(China) SatNet LEO Group 25	China SatNet	Low Earth	Communications	In orbit	Operational
17 September; 01:07:56	(United States) Falcon 9 Block 5		(United States) Vandenberg SLC-4E		(United States) SpaceX	
17 September; 01:07:56	(United States) USA-668 - USA-684 (Starshield Group 1-16)	USSF	Low Earth (Polar)	TBD	In orbit	Operational
17 September; 01:07:56	USSF-259 (SBST TH-1) mission. Third of 18 planned missions for the USSF's Space Based Sensing and Targeting (SBST) portfolio. 17 Modified Starshields, suspected to be first batch of Airborne Moving Target Indicator Satellites.					
17 September; 02:40:00	(China) KZ-11	Y3	(China) Jiuquan		(China) CASIC	
17 September; 02:40:00	(China) Tianyi 51	TBD	Low Earth	Earth observation	In orbit	Operational
17 September; 02:40:00	(China) Tianyi 52	TBD	Low Earth	Earth observation	In orbit	Operational
17 September; 02:40:00	C-band Interferometric SAR twin sats.					
17 September; 16:50	(Russia) Soyuz 2.1b / Fregat-M		(Russia) Plesetsk Cosmodrome Site 43/3		(Russia) RVSN RF	
17 September; 16:50	(Russia) GLONASS-K	TBA	Medium Earth	Navigation	In orbit	Operational
19 September; 03:22	(United States) Electron	Owl by The Dozen	(New Zealand) Mahia LC-1B		(United States) Rocket Lab	
19 September; 03:22	(Japan) StriX-10	Synspective	Low Earth	Earth observation	In orbit	Operational
19 September; 03:22	12th StriX satellite launched by Rocket Lab for Synspective.					
19 September; 10:50	(China) Long March 2D		(China) Taiyuan Satellite Launch Center LA-9		(China) CASC	
19 September; 10:50	(China) PIESAT-2 13 to 16	TBA	Low Earth (SSO)	Earth observation	In orbit	Operational
19 September; 10:50	Satellites developed by GALAXYSPACE					
20 September; 01:47	(United States) Falcon 9 Block 5	Starlink Group 15-27	(United States) Vandenberg SLC-4E		(United States) SpaceX	
20 September; 01:47	(United States) Starlink × 27	SpaceX	Low Earth	Communications	In orbit	Operational
20 September; 04:03	(China) Kinetica 1	Y18	(China) Jiuquan LS-130		(China) CAS Space	
20 September; 04:03	(China) Qinling-01 and 02	TBA	Low Earth (SSO)	Ecological environmental protection	In orbit	Operational
20 September; 04:03	(China) Supercomputing-1	TBA	Low Earth (SSO)	Imaginary and Orbital Computing	In orbit	Operational
20 September; 04:03	9 satellites					
23 September; 13:32:00	(China) Long March 8A		(China) Wenchang Commercial LC-1		(China) CASC	
23 September; 13:32:00	(China) SatNet LEO Group 26	China Satellite Network Group	Low Earth	Communications satellite	In orbit	Operational
24 September; 08:46:00	(China) Long March 6A	6A-Y27	(China) Taiyuan LA-9A		(China) CASC	
24 September; 08:46:00	(China) Yaogan 40 Group 04	PLA Aerospace force	Low Earth (Polar)	Reconnaissance satellite	In orbit	Operational
26 September; 00:39	(United States) Electron	Owlright, Owlright, Owlright	(New Zealand) Mahia LC-1B		(United States) Rocket Lab	
26 September; 00:39	(Japan) StriX-12	Synspective	Low Earth	Earth observation	In orbit	Operational
26 September; 00:39	13th StriX satellite launched by Rocket Lab for Synspective.					
26 September; 14:00	(United States) Falcon 9 Block 5		(United States) Vandenberg SLC-4E		(United States) SpaceX	
26 September; 14:00	(United States) USA-685 - USA-707 (Starshield Group 1-17)	United States Space Force	TBD	TBD	In orbit	Operational
26 September; 14:00	USSF-385 (SBST R-3) Mission. Third of 18 planned missions for the USSF's Space Based Sensing and Targeting (SBST) portfolio. 23 Modified Starshields, suspected to be part of the new Starshield-based Space Data Network Backbone.					
28 September; 12:48	(United States) Starship	Starlink Group 31-1	(United States) Starbase Pad 2		(United States) SpaceX	
28 September; 12:48	(United States) Starlink x26	SpaceX	Low Earth	Communications	In orbit	Operational
28 September; 12:48	Starship flight test 14 was the first orbital test flight of Starship. This flight also deployed 26 next-gen Starlink v3 satellites, making it the first commercial flight of the Starship.					

- ← Jan
- Feb
- Mar
- Apr
- May
- Jun
- Jul
- Aug
- Sep
- Oct
- Nov
- Dec →

== Suborbital flights ==
Date and time (UTC)	Rocket	Flight number	Launch site		LSP	
Date and time (UTC)	Payload (⚀ = CubeSat)	Operator	Orbit	Function	Decay (UTC)	Outcome
Date and time (UTC)	Remarks					
6 July; 04:01	(China) JL-2		(China) Type 094 Sub?,Bohai		(China) PLA Rocket Force	
6 July; 04:01	(China) Live warhead	PLA Navy	Suborbital	Missile test	6 July	Successful
6 July; 04:01	Apogee: 1,000 km (620 mi), SLBM test launch into Pacific Ocean					
24 July; 22:51	(United States) Starship	Flight 13	(United States) Starbase Pad 2		(United States) SpaceX	
24 July; 22:51	(United States) Starlink v3 x20	SpaceX	Transatmospheric	Communications	24 July	Successful
24 July; 22:51	Thirteenth Starship flight test. It repeated the same flight profile as the previous flights, with the ship falling slightly short of reaching orbit. This was the first flight with real Starlink v3 satellites. Six Starlinks were fitted with lights and cameras to look at Starships heat shield before reentry. All of the satellites also deployed their solar arrays and antennas to test newer hardware and to connect with the Starlink constellation via high-capacity lasers.					
19 August; 19:30	(South Korea) SEBIT		(Brazil) Alcântara		Innospace	
19 August; 19:30	(South Korea)	Innospace	Suborbital	Flight test	19 August	Launch failure
19 August; 19:30	Approximately one minute after liftoff, as the flight trajectory of SEBIT deviated from the preplanned path, the Brazilian Air Force activated the ‘Flight Termination System (FTS)’ under launch site safety rules.					
27 August	(Poland) Perun	FLIGHT 4	(Poland) Central Air Force Training Range in Ustka		(Poland) SpaceForest	
27 August			Suborbital		27 August	Successful
15 September	(Brazil) VS-30		(Brazil) Barreira do Inferno Launch Center		(Brazil) Brazilian Space Agency	
15 September	(Brazil) Plataforma Suborbital de Microgravidade (PSM)	DCTA	Suborbital	Technology demonstration	15 September	Successful
