= Royal Norwegian Air Force =

Air warfare branch of Norway's armed forces

- Luftforsvaret
- Badge of the Royal Norwegian Air Force
- Founded: 10 November 1944; 82 years ago
- Country: Norway
- Allegiance: Kingdom of Norway
- Type: Air force
- Role: Aerial warfare
- Size: 3,650; 102 aircraft
- Part of: Norwegian Armed Forces
- Headquarters: Rygge Air Station
- Mottos: Konge, Folk og Fedreland; "King, People and Fatherland"
- Website: forsvaret.no/luftforsvaret

Commanders
- Commander-in-Chief: Haakon VIII
- Prime Minister: (Norway) Jonas Gahr Støre
- Minister of Defence: Tore O. Sandvik
- Chief of Defence: General Eirik Kristoffersen
- Chief of the Royal Norwegian Air Force: Major General Øivind Gunnerud
- Command Sergeant Major of the Royal Norwegian Air Force: Chief Master Sergeant Didrik Sand

Insignia
- Roundel

- Ensign

Aircraft flown
- Fighter: F-35A
- Helicopter: AW101, Bell 412
- Patrol: P-8 Poseidon
- Trainer: Saab Safari
- Transport: C-130J-30

The Royal Norwegian Air Force (RNoAF) (Norwegian: Luftforsvaret, lit. 'The Air Defence') is the air force of Norway. It was established as a separate arm of the Norwegian Armed Forces on 10 November 1944. The RNoAF's peacetime establishment is approximately 2,430 employees (officers, enlisted staff and civilians). 600 personnel also serve their draft period in the RNoAF. After mobilization, the RNoAF would consist of approximately 5,500 personnel.

The infrastructure of the RNoAF includes seven airbases (at Ørland, Rygge, Andøya, Evenes, Bardufoss, Bodø, and Gardermoen). It also has one control and reporting centre (in Sørreisa Municipality) and three training centres: Værnes in Stjørdal Municipality (about 33 km or 18 nmi northeast of Trondheim), Kjevik in Kristiansand Municipality, and at KNM Harald Haarfagre/Madlaleiren in Stavanger Municipality.

== History ==
=== Conception ===
Military flights started on 1 June 1912. The first plane, HNoMS Start, was bought with money donated by the public and piloted by Hans Dons, second in command of Norway's first submarine HNoMS Kobben (A-1). Until 1940 most of the aircraft belonging to the Navy and Army air forces were domestic designs or built under license agreements, the main bomber/scout aircraft of the Army air force being the Dutch-originated Fokker C.V.

=== World War II ===
==== Build-up for World War II ====
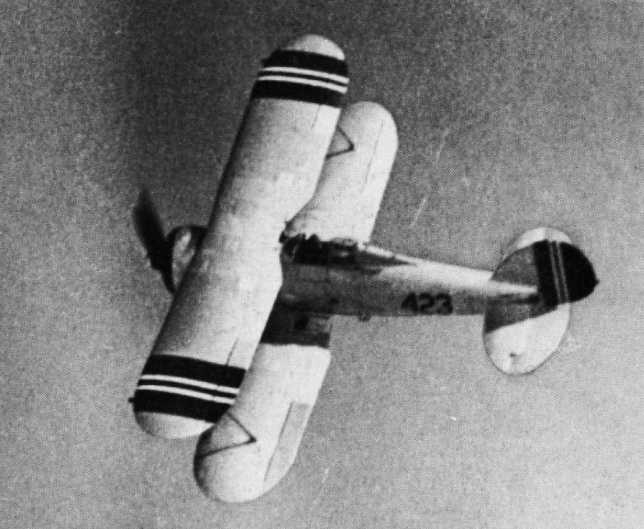
Gloster Gladiator 423 in 1938–1940

Before 1944, the Air Force were divided into the Norwegian Army Air Service (Hærens Flyvevaaben) and the Royal Norwegian Navy Air Service (Marinens Flyvevaaben).

In the late 1930s, as war seemed imminent, more modern aircraft were bought from abroad, including twelve Gloster Gladiator fighters from the UK, and six Heinkel He 115s from Germany. Considerable orders for aircraft were placed with United States companies during the months prior to the invasion of Norway on 9 April 1940.

The most important of the US orders were two orders for comparatively modern Curtiss P-36 Hawk monoplane fighters. The first was for 24 Hawk 75A-6 (with 1200 hp Pratt & Whitney R-1830-SC3-G Twin Wasp engines), 19 of which were delivered before the invasion. Of these 19, though, none were operational when the attack came. A number were still in their shipping crates in Oslo harbour, while others stood at the Kjeller aircraft factory, flight ready, but none combat ready. Some of the Kjeller aircraft had not been fitted with machine guns, and those that had been fitted still lacked gun sights.

The ship with the last five 75A-6s that were bound for Norway was diverted to the United Kingdom, where they were taken over by Royal Air Force (RAF). All 19 Norwegian P-36s that were captured by the German invaders were later sold by the German authorities to the Finnish Air Force, which was to use them to good effect during the Continuation War.

The other order for P-36s was for 36 Hawk 75A-8 (with 1200 hp Wright R-1820-95 Cyclone 9 engines), none of which were delivered in time for the invasion, but were delivered to "Little Norway" near Toronto, Ontario, Canada. There they were used for training Norwegian pilots until the USAAF took over the aircraft and used them under the designation P-36G.

Also ordered prior to the invasion were 24 Northrop N-3PB float planes built in on Norwegian specifications for a patrol bomber. The order was made on 12 March 1940 in an effort to replace the Royal Norwegian Navy Air Service's obsolete MF.11 biplane patrol aircraft. None of the type were delivered by 9 April and when they became operational with the 330 (Norwegian) Squadron in May 1941 they were stationed at Reykjavík, Iceland performing anti-submarine and convoy escort duties.

1937–1940 aircraft marking

==== Escape and exile ====
The unequal situation led to the rapid defeat of the Norwegian air forces, even though seven Gladiators from the fighter wing (Jagevingen) defended Fornebu airport against the attacking German forces with some success—claiming two Bf 110 heavy fighters, two He 111 bombers and one Junkers Ju 52 transport. Jagevingen lost two Gladiators to ground strafing while they were rearming on Fornebu and one in the air, shot down by Future Experte Helmut Lent, injuring the sergeant pilot. After the withdrawal of allied forces, the Norwegian Government ceased fighting in Norway and evacuated to the United Kingdom on 10 June 1940.

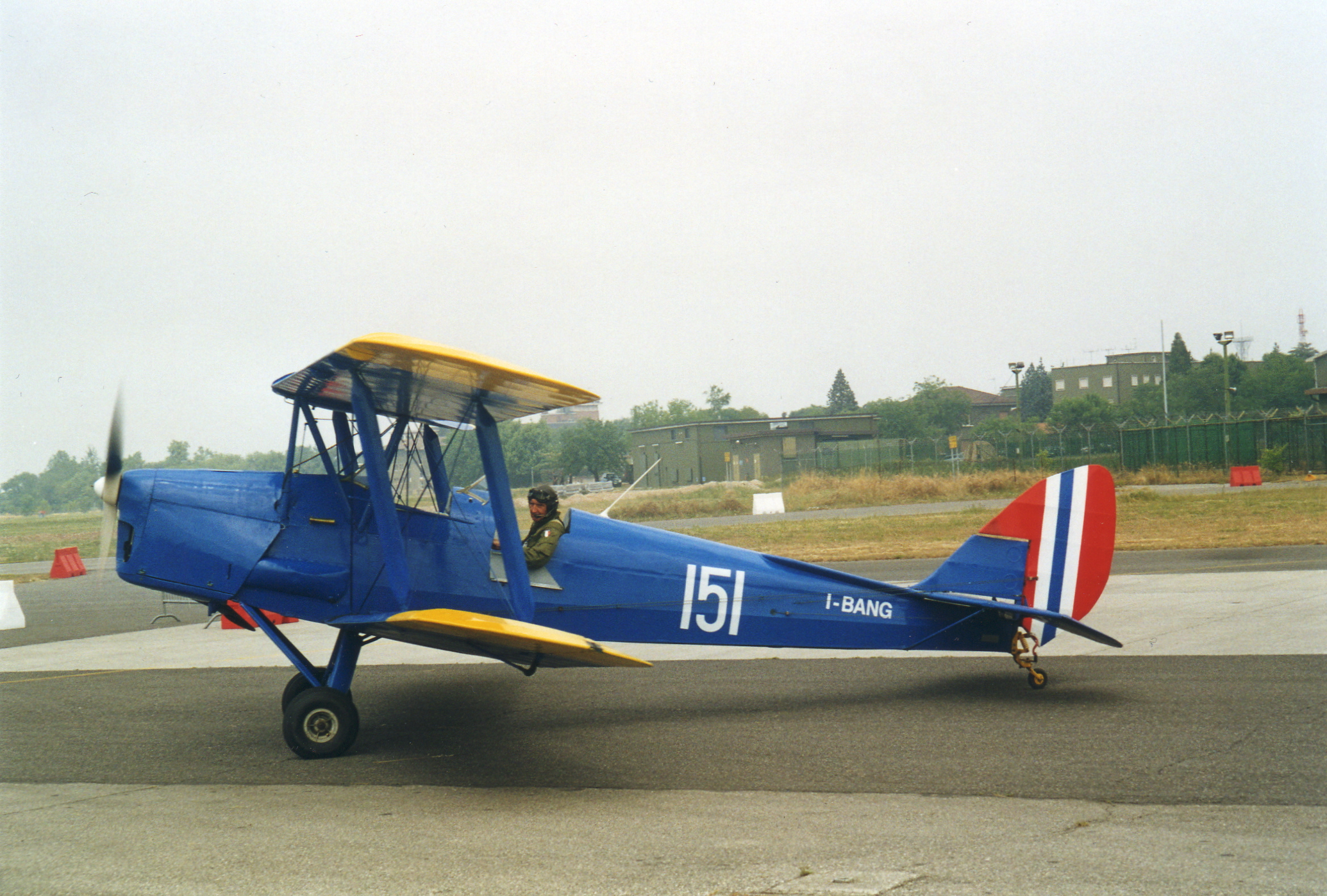
DH.82A Tiger Moth in Royal Norwegian Air Force markings

Only aircraft of the Royal Norwegian Navy Air Service had the range to fly all the way from their last remaining bases in Northern Norway to the UK. Included amongst the Norwegian aircraft that reached the British Isles were four German-made Heinkel He 115 seaplane bombers, six of which were bought before the war and two more were captured from the Germans during the Norwegian Campaign. One He 115 also escaped to Finland before the surrender of mainland Norway, as did three M.F. 11s; landing on Lake Salmijärvi in Petsamo. A captured Arado Ar 196 originating from the German heavy cruiser Admiral Hipper was also flown to Britain for testing.

For the Norwegian Army Air Service aircraft the only option for escape was Finland, where the planes would be interned but at least not fall into the hands of the Germans. In all two Fokker C.V.s and one de Havilland Tiger Moth made it across the border and onto Finnish airfields just before the capitulation of mainland Norway. All navy and army aircraft that fled to Finland were pressed into service with the Finnish Air Force, while most of the aircrew eventually ended up in "Little Norway".

The Army and Navy air services established themselves in Britain under the command of the Joint Chiefs of Staff. Norwegian air and ground crews operated as part of the British Royal Air Force, in both wholly Norwegian squadrons and also in other squadrons and units such as RAF Ferry Command and RAF Bomber Command. In particular, Norwegian personnel operated two squadrons of Supermarine Spitfires: RAF 132 (Norwegian) Wing consisted of No. 331 (Norwegian) Squadron and RAF No. 332 (Norwegian) Squadron. Both planes and running costs were financed by the exiled Norwegian government.

In the autumn of 1940, a Norwegian training centre known as "Little Norway" was established next to Toronto Island Airport, Canada.

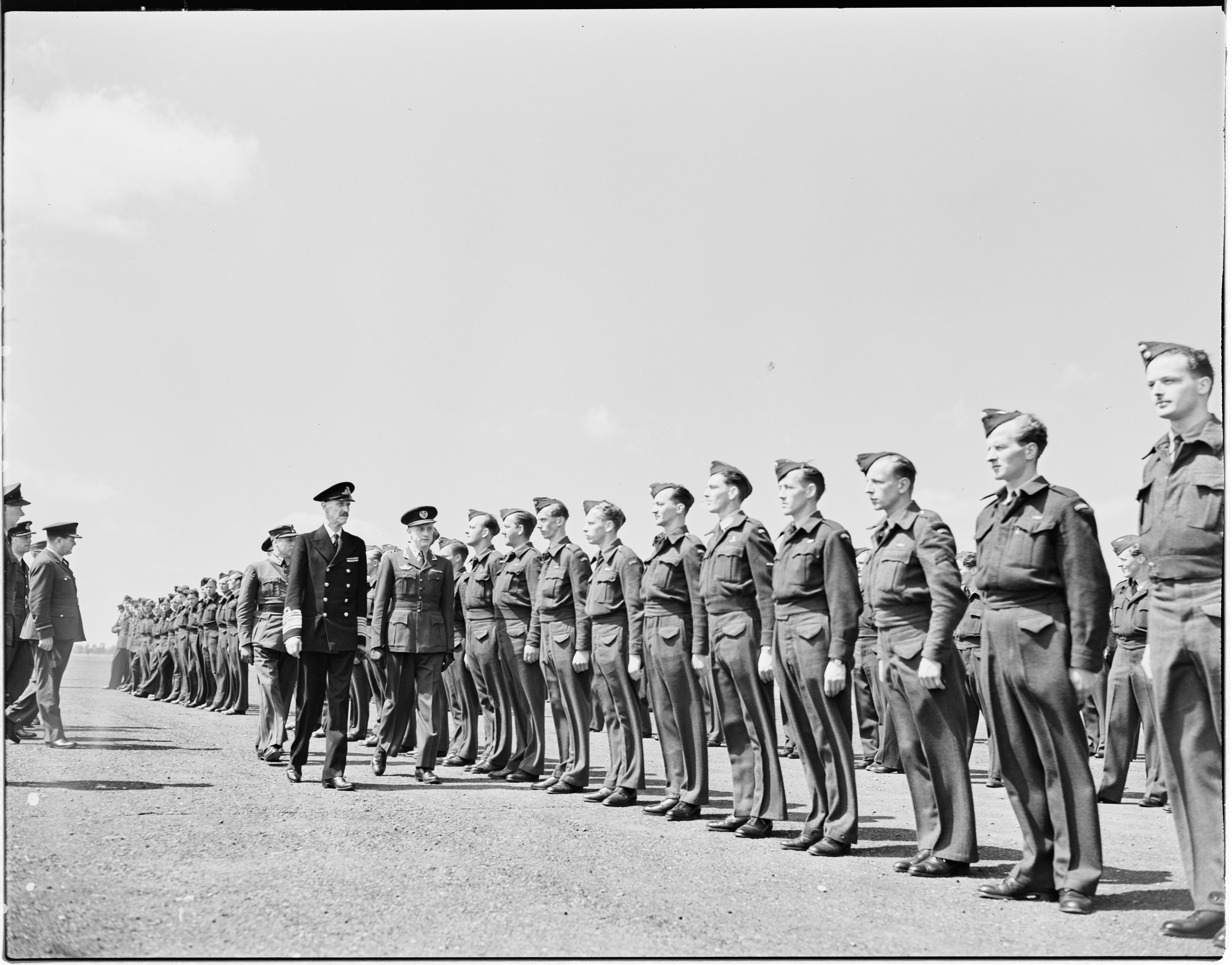
King Haakon VII with Norwegian pilots in the United Kingdom

The Royal Norwegian Air Force (RNoAF) was established by a royal decree on 1 November 1944, thereby merging the Army and Navy air forces. No. 331 (Norwegian) Squadron defended London from 1941 and was the highest scoring fighter squadron in South England during the war.

Up until 8 May 1945, 335 persons had lost their lives while taking part in the efforts of the RNoAF.

=== Post-war air force ===
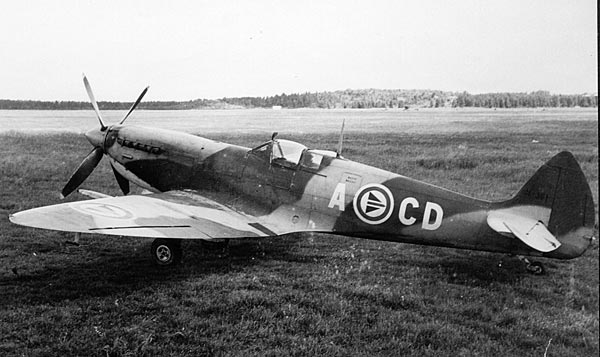
Royal Norwegian Air Force Spitfire

After the war the Spitfire remained in service with the RNoAF into the fifties.

In 1947, the Surveillance and Control Division acquired its first radar system, and around the same time the RNoAF got its first jet fighters in the form of de Havilland Vampires.

In 1949 Norway co-founded NATO, and soon afterwards received American aircraft through the MAP (Military Aid Program). The expansion of the Air Force happened at a very rapid pace as the Cold War progressed. Throughout the Cold War the Norwegian Air Force was only one of two NATO air forces—Turkey being the other—with a responsibility for an area with a land border with the Soviet Union, and Norwegian fighter aircraft had on average 500–600 interceptions of Soviet aircraft each year.

In 1959, the Anti-Aircraft Artillery was integrated into the Royal Norwegian Air Force.

In 1999, Norway participated with six F-16s during the NATO bombing of Yugoslavia.

=== 21st century RNoAF ===
In October 2002, a tri-national force of 18 Norwegian, Danish, and Dutch F-16 fighter-bombers, with one Dutch Air Force KC-10A tanker, flew to the Manas Air Base in Kyrgyzstan, to support the NATO ground forces in Afghanistan as a part of the Operation Enduring Freedom. One of the missions was Operation Desert Lion.

On 27–28 January, Norwegian F-16s bombed Hezb-e Islami Gulbuddin Fighters in the Adi Ghar Mountains during the beginnings of Operation Mongoose.

In 2004, four F-16s participated on NATO's Baltic Air Policing operation.

Beginning from February 2006, eight Royal Netherlands Air Force F-16s, joined by four Royal Norwegian Air Force F-16s, supported NATO International Security Assistance Force ground troops mostly in the southern provinces of Afghanistan. The air detachment is known as the 1st Netherlands-Norwegian European Participating Forces Expeditionary Air Wing (1 NLD/NOR EEAW).

==== 2010s ====
In 2011, a detachment of F-16s were sent to enforce the Libyan no-fly zone. In a statement, Foreign Minister Jonas Gahr Støre condemned the violence against "peaceful protesters in Libya, Bahrain and Yemen", saying the protests "are an expression of the people's desire for more participatory democracy. The authorities must respect fundamental human rights such as political, economic and social rights. It is now vital that all parties do their utmost to foster peaceful dialogue on reforms". On 19 March 2011, the Norwegian government authorized the Royal Norwegian Air Force for deployment in Libya. Norway approved six F-16 fighters and personnel. The deployment started on 21 March and operated from the Souda Air Base in Souda Bay on Crete.

On 24 March 2011, F-16s from the Royal Norwegian Air Force were assigned to the United States Africa Command during Operation Odyssey Dawn. On 25 March 2011, laser-guided bombs were launched from F-16s of the Royal Norwegian Air Force against Libyan tanks and during the night towards 26 March an airfield was bombed. Forces were also deployed to Operation Unified Protector on 26 March 2011.

By July 2011, the Norwegian F-16's had dropped close to 600 bombs, some 17% of the total bombs dropped at that time. It was Norwegian F-16s that on the night towards 26 April, bombed Gaddafi's headquarter in Tripoli.

From September to December 2011, the Air Force contributed personnel and one P-3 Orion to Operation Ocean Shield. Operating from the Seychelles, the aircraft searched for pirates in the Somali Basin.

In April 2016 the life of a patient, at the hospital in Bodø, was saved when necessary medical equipment was ferried halfway across Norway by an Air Force F-16 jet from Værnes Air Station, in a flight that took 25 minutes.

On 29 March 2017, Norway signed a contract for five P-8As, to be delivered between 2022 and 2023.

On 3 November 2017, RNoAF took delivery of the first F-35A Lightning II.

==== 2020s ====
In March 2021, RNoAF participated in Icelandic Air Policing with four F-35A Lightning II and 130 military personnel.

On 6 January 2022, the F-35 officially took over the Quick Reaction Alert mission, ending the F-16 fleet's 42 year-long mission and making Norway the first country in the world to field a fighter fleet entirely composed of fifth-generation fighters.

In December 2021, Romania expressed their interest to purchase 32 F-16As. The first three aircraft were delivered in November 2023.

In June 2022, Norway terminated a contract to acquire 14 NH90 helicopters, claiming that the supplier could not deliver and sustain the availability of combat capable aircraft that Norway required. All NH90 flight operations are discontinued, all acquired aircraft are planned to be returned to the manufacturer, and in due course Norway intends to acquire a new aircraft.

On 1 April 2025, RNoAF received its final 2 F-35A's, completing its procurement of 52 aircraft.

In January 2026, Norway decided to acquire two additional AW101 "SAR Queen" helicopters and establish Tromsø as the search and rescue base, transferring the site from civilian operation to the RNoAF by 2030.

== Plans ==
On 14 March 2023, RNoAF announced a contract for six SH-60 Seahawk as a replacement for the NH90. The three first helicopters will be delivered in 2025.

In April 2024 the Strategic Defence Plan announced the intention to acquire one extra C-130J Super Hercules and undisclosed number of helicopters to support the Army and special force. The plan also proposes increasing NASAMS's batteries to 6. As well as increasing the Army's air defence to 2 batteries. 2 batteries of layered air defences with ballistic capacity will also be introduced (Patriot or new NASAMS with long-range missiles).

== Organization 2025 ==
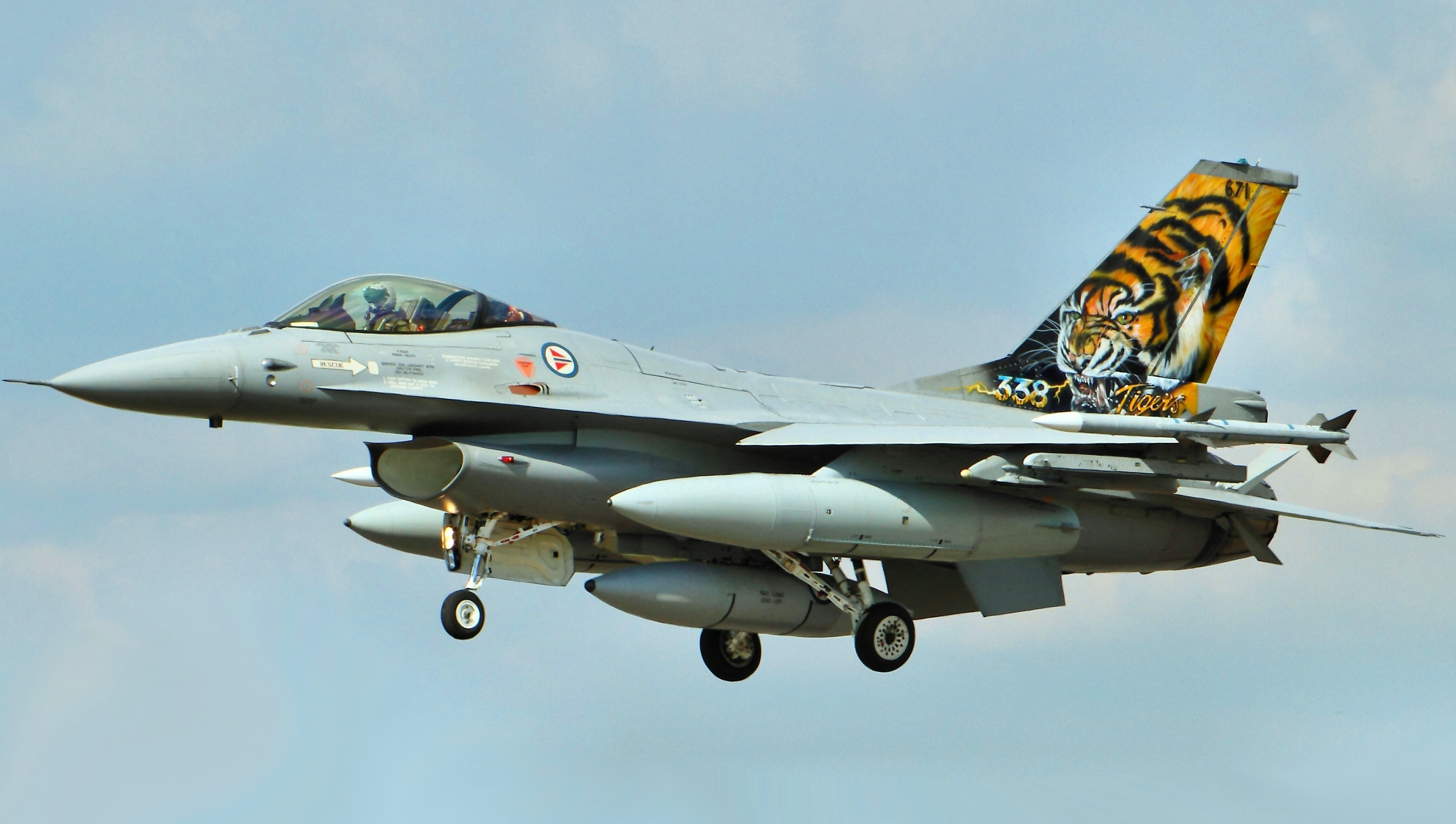
An F-16AM landing at RIAT 2014

Royal Norwegian Air Force locations 2025
F-35A Lightning II Boeing P-8A Poseidon Helicopters
Control and reporting center Radar station
Other flying units Other air stations Naval base

The RNoAF is organized in five Air Wings. These are divided into a total of one Control and Reporting Center, nine flying squadrons as well as two ground based air defence units. The former distinctiontion between a Main Air Station (hovedflystasjon) and an Air Station (flystasjon) was replaced by a new distinction between an Air Force Station (flystasjon) and an Air Force Base (Luftforsvarets base).

- 131 Air Wing, in Sorreisa
  - Control and Reporting Center Sørreisa, reports to NATO's Integrated Air Defence System CAOC Uedem in Germany
    - Regional Maintenance Center Sorreisa, in Sorreisa
      - Radar Station Njunis, with RAT-31SL/N (will be replaced by AN/TPY-4 before 2030)
      - Radar Station Senja, with RAT-31SL/N (will be replaced by AN/TPY-4 before 2030)
      - Radar Station Honningsvåg, with RAT-31SL/N (will be replaced by AN/TPY-4 before 2030)
      - Radar Station Vestvågøy, with SINDRE I (being replaced by AN/TPY-4)
      - Radar Station Grøhøgda, with AN/TPY-4 (under construction)
    - Regional Maintenance Center Værnes, at Værnes Air Station
      - Radar Station Hestgrovheia, with AN/TPY-4 (under construction)
      - Radar Station Håmmålsfjellet, with AN/TPY-4 (under construction)
      - Radar Station Øyenskavlen, with AN/TPY-4 (under construction)
    - Regional Maintenance Center Rygge, at Rygge Air Station
      - Radar Station Vågsøy, with AN/TPY-4
      - Radar Station Skykula, with SINDRE I (being replaced by AN/TPY-4)
      - Radar Station Sirikjerke, with AN/TPY-4 (under construction)
- 132 Air Wing (132 Luftving), HQ at Ørland Air Station
  - Ørland Air Station (Ørland flystasjon)
    - 331 Squadron (331 Skvadron), with F-35A Lightning II
    - 332 Squadron (332 skvadron), with F-35A Lightning II
    - Testing, Training and Tactics Development Squadron (Testing, trening og taktikk skvadron), with F-35A Lightning II
    - Aircraft Maintenance Group Ørland (Vedlikeholdsgruppen Ørland)
    - Air Defence Battalion NASAMS III (Luftvernbataljonen NASAMS III)
    - Base Defence Squadron (Baseforsvarsskvadron)
    - Base Operations Group Ørland (Basegruppen Ørland)
    - Air Force Logistical Base (Logbase Luft)
    - NATO Airborne Early Warning Force – Forward Operating Location, for E-3A Sentry
- 133 Air Wing, HQ at Evenes Air Station
  - Evenes Air Station (Evenes flystasjon) - The air station also provides a forward deployment location for the F-35A fighters of the 132nd Air Wing. The expansion of Evenes Air Station and its increased importance will see the base field its own air defence unit with NASAMS III, independent from the one in Ørland and its own base defence squadron. When Evenes expands to its planned capability, the base will have the following composition:
    - Evenes Staff Unit (Stab Evenes)
    - 333 Squadron (333 skvadron), with 5 P-8A Poseidon aircraft in the ASW, maritime patrol, ELINT and EW roles.
    - Aircraft Maintenance Squadron (Vedlikeholdsskvadron)
    - Air Defence Battery (Luftvernbatteri) (separate from the Air Defence Battalion at Ørland air base)
    - Base Defence Squadron (Baseforsvarsskvadron)
    - Base Operations Squadron (Baseskvadron)
    - Base [Staff] Department(Baseavdeling)
    - In addition to the strictly Air Force units Evenes Air Station will also house small contingents (personnel numbers in brackets) of the Norwegian Cyber Defence Force (CYFOR) (20), Norwegian Armed Forces Logistics Organisation (FLO) (30) and the Norwegian Defence Estates Agency (Forsvarsbygg) (20) for a total planned personnel of 651 people at the base.
  - Andøya Station Group (Stasjonsgruppe Andøya) at Andøya Air Force Base (Luftforsvarets base Andøya
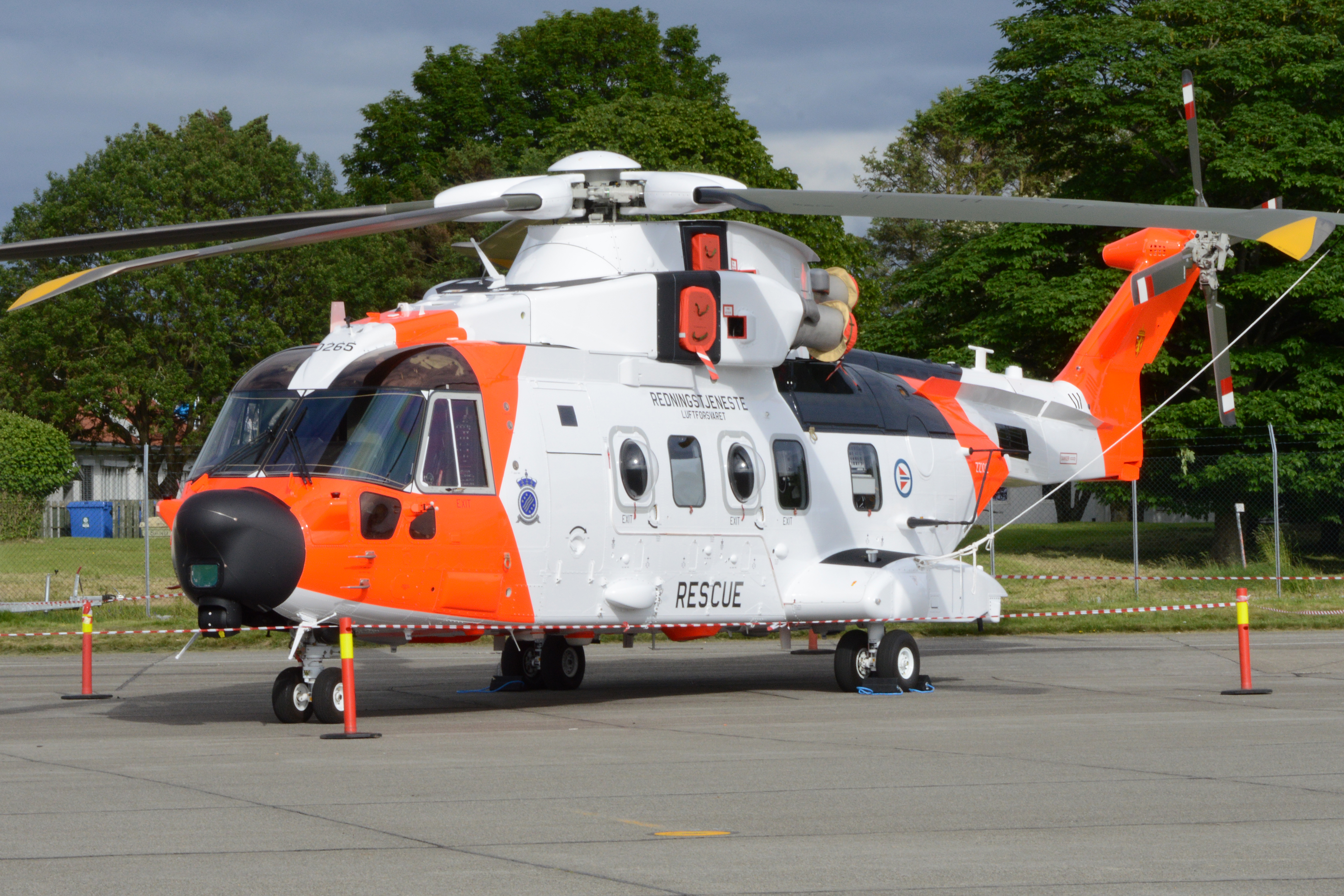
- A Norwegian AW101, designated SAR Queen in Norwegian service
  134 Air Wing, at Rygge Air Station
  - Rygge Air Station (Rygge flystasjon)
    - 339 Special Operations Aviation Squadron (339 skvadron), with Bell 412 SP (Special forces support)
    - Special Operations Air Task Group
  - Gardermoen Station Group (Stasjonsgruppe Gardermoen) at Air Force Base Gardermoen (Luftforsvarets base Gardermoen), the military section of Oslo - Gardermoen IAP (The 135th Air Wing was disbanded in August 2018 and absorbed into the 134th Air Wing.)
    - 335 Squadron (335 skvadron), with C-130J-30 Super Hercules
    - Armed Forces Center for Electronic Warfare (Forsvarets elektroniske krigføringssenter (FEKS))
- 131 Air Wing (131 luftving), HQ at Bardufoss Air Station
  - Bardufoss Air Station (Bardufoss flystasjon)
    - 337 Squadron (337 skvadron), also known as the Coast Guard Squadron (Kystvaktskvadronen), as the helicopters operate in support of the Norwegian Coast Guard
    - Air Force Flying School (Luftforsvarets flygeskole), with MFI-17 Supporter
    - Aircraft Maintenance Squadron (Vedlikeholdsskvadron)
    - Base Operations Squadron (Baseskvadron)
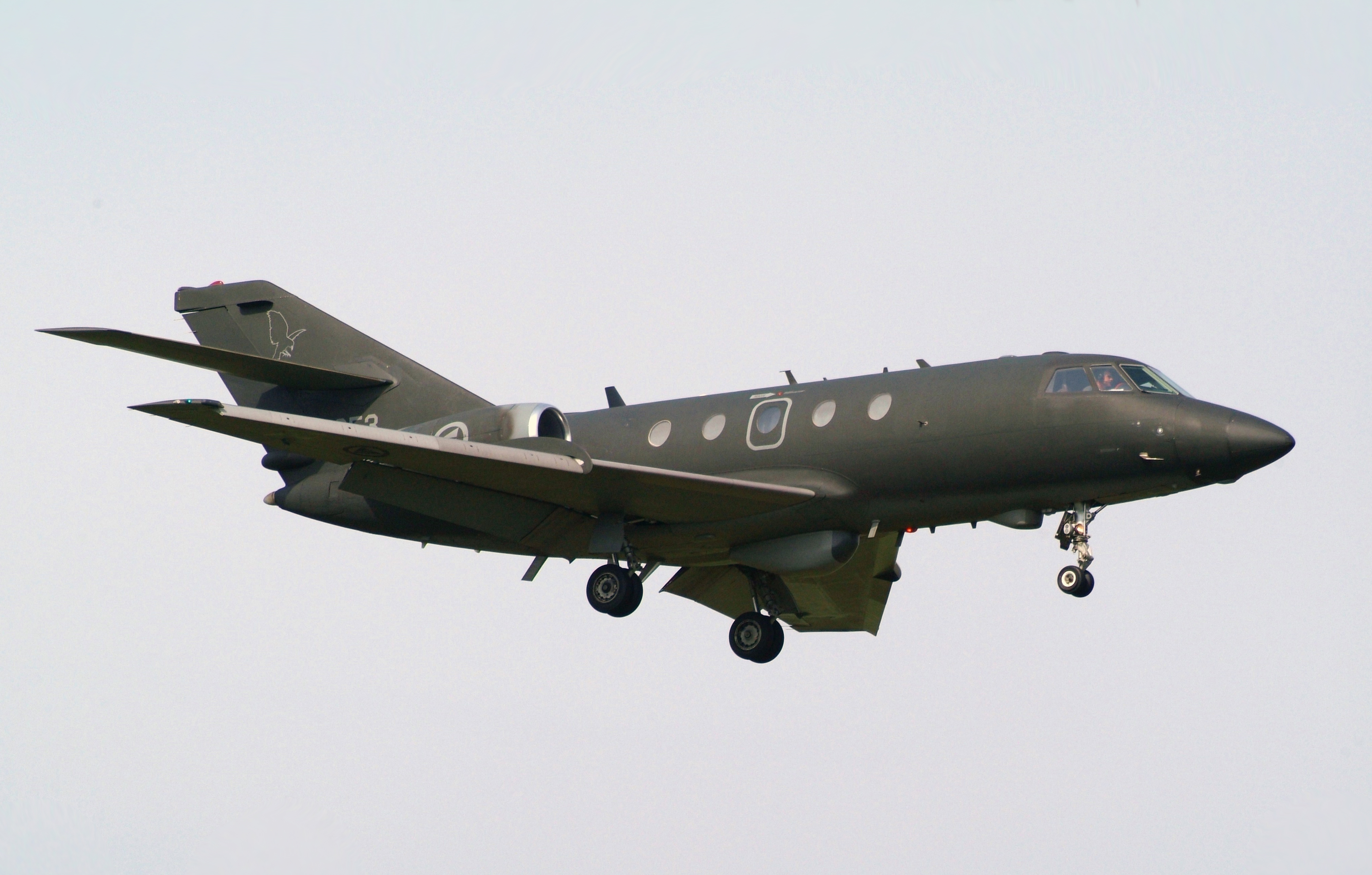
      A Norwegian Dassault Falcon 20
  - Air Force Base Haakonsvern (Luftforsvarets base Haakonsvern) (air force part of the Haakonsvern Naval Base (Haakonsvern orlogsstasjon)
    - 334 Squadron (334 skvadron), also known as the Frigate [Helicopter] Squadron (Fregattskvadronen), as the helicopters operate on board the Fridtjof Nansen-class frigates
  - Station Group Banak (Stasjonsgruppe Banak), at Lakselv Airport
- 130 Air Wing (130 luftving), HQ at Stavanger - Sola Air Station. In Norway, air rescue falls under the Ministry of Justice and Public Security, which finances the service, including the 16 AW101 helicopters. The130 Air Wing is the operational component, organized, staffed, and operated by the Air Force on behalf of the ministry. Rescue helicopters maintain 15 minute readiness.
  - 330 Squadron (330 skvadron), Search and Rescue with AgustaWestland AW101 helicopters
    - Sola Air Station
    - Detachment Banak (Detasjement Banak) at Banak Air Force Base
    - Detachment Bodø (Detasjement Bodø), at Bodø Air Force Base
    - Detachment Ørland (Detasjement Ørland) Ørland Air Station
    - Detachment Rygge (Detasjement Rygge) (Rygge Air Station
    - Detachment Florø (Detasjement Florø) at Florø Airport
- Air force Schools (Luftforsvarets skoler)
  - Royal Norwegian Air Force Academy, in Trondheim
  - Air Force Air Operational Training and Certification Center (Luftforsvarets flyoperative trenings- og sertifiseringssenter), formerly Air Force Air Tactical School (Luftforsvarets flytaktiske skole), at Rygge
  - Air Force Flight Training School (Luftforsvarets flygeskole), at Bardufoss, listed above under the Bardufoss Air Station, Maritime Helicopter Wing entry.
  - Air Defence Tactical School (Luftverntaktisk skole), at Ørland
  - Air Force Base Defence Tactical School (Luftforsvarets baseforsvarstaktiske skole), at Værnes Air Station
  - Air Force Control and Reporting School (Luftforsvarets kontroll- og varslingsskole), in Sørreisa
  - Air Force Flight Technical School (Luftforsvarets tekniske skole), at Kjevik
  - Air Force Specialists School (Luftforsvarets spesialistskole), at Kjevik
  - Air Warfare School (Luftkrigsskolen), at Trondheim. In 2018 the Air Warfare School (Air Force Officer School) became part of the Armed Forces Academy (Forsvarets Høgskole) and thus no longer part of the Air Force. Listed above as the Royal Norwegian Air Force Academy.

== Aircraft ==
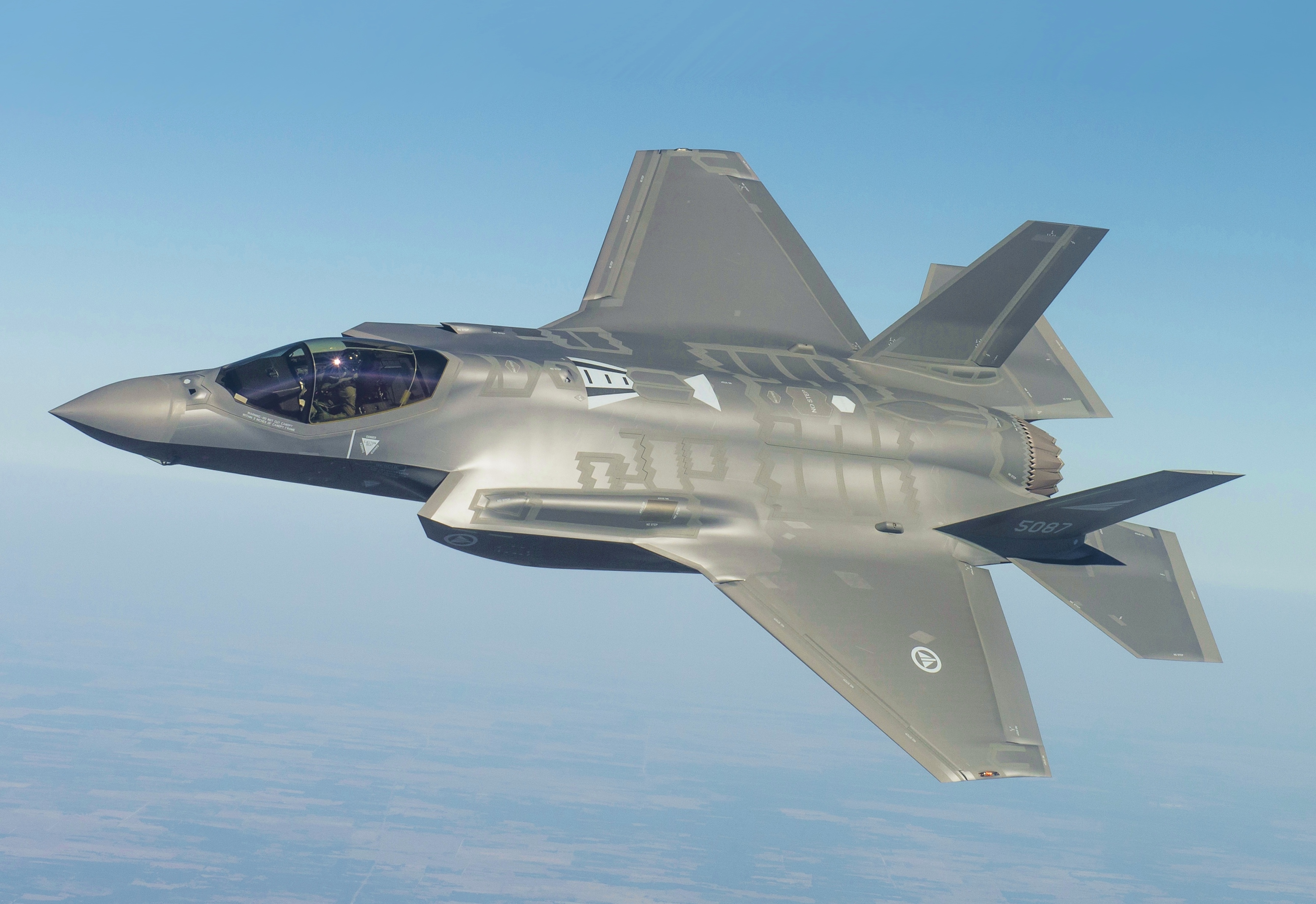
A Norwegian F-35 Lightning II

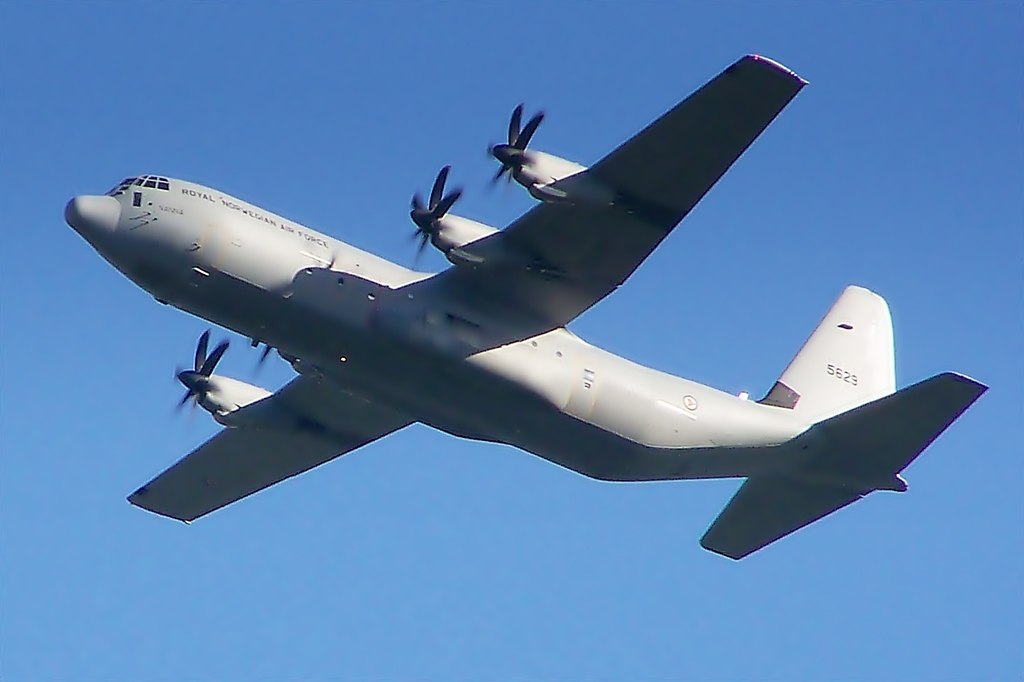
A Norwegian C-130J

=== Current inventory ===
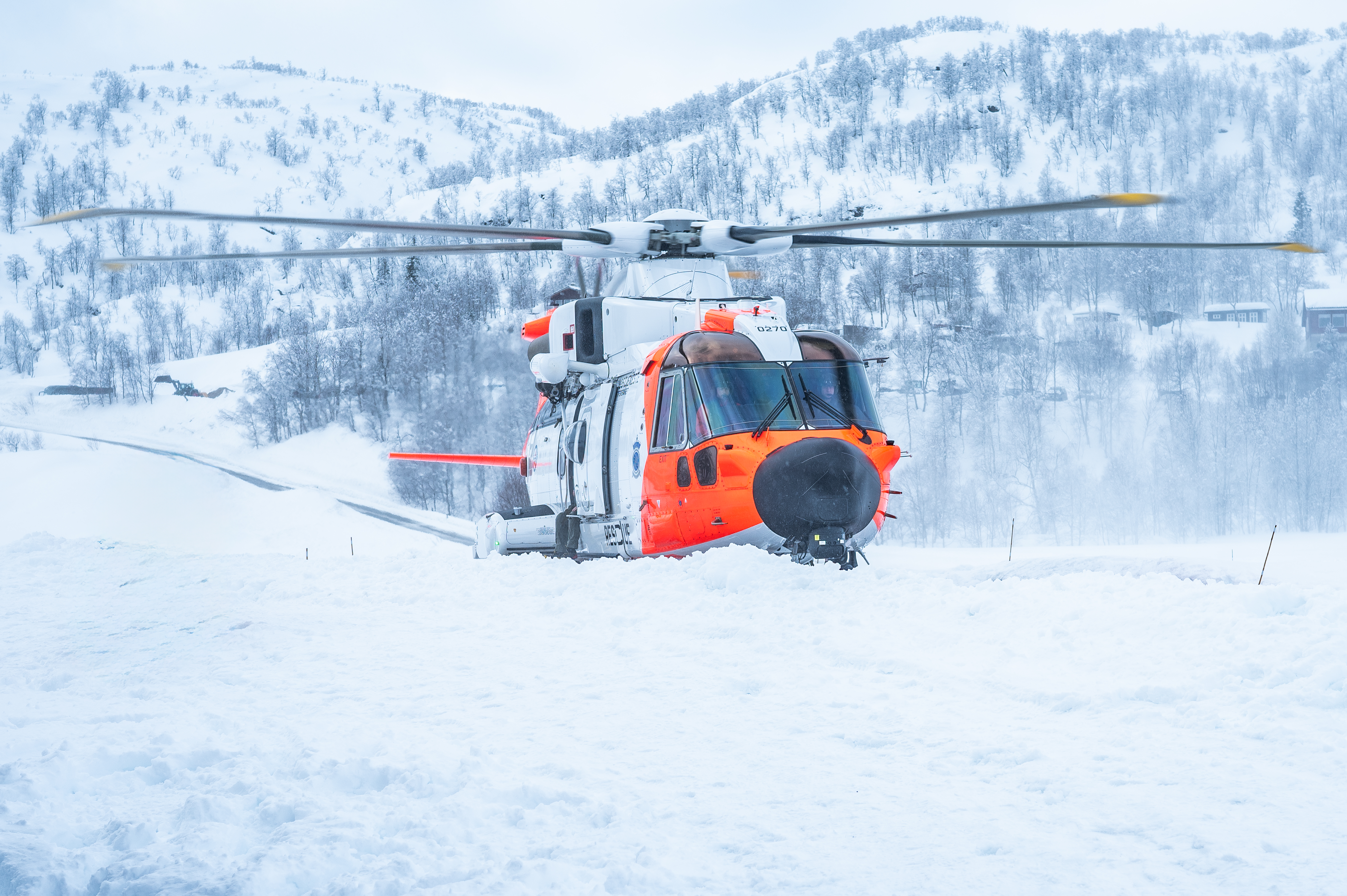
Norwegian AW101

Aircraft	Origin	Role	Variant	In service	Notes
Combat aircraft
Lockheed Martin F-35 Lightning II	United States	Stealth / swingrole fighter	F-35A	44	
Maritime patrol
Boeing P-8 Poseidon	United States	ASW / MPA	P-8A	5	
Transport
Lockheed Martin C-130J Super Hercules	United States	Tactical airlifter	C-130J-30	4	
Helicopters
AgustaWestland AW101	Italy / United Kingdom	SAR / utility	AW101-612 (SAR Queen)	16	
Bell 412	United States	Utility	412SP	18	9 relocated at the Bardufoss after the MLU.
Bell 412	United States	Utility	412HP	18	9 relocated at the Bardufoss after the MLU.
Sikorsky MH-60 Seahawk	United States	ASW / utility	MH-60R	0 (+6 on oder)	
Trainer aircraft
F-35 Lightning II	United States	Conversion trainer	F-35A	8	
Saab MFI-15 Safari	Sweden	Basic trainer	–	15	

=== Co-owned aicraft ===
Aircraft	Origin	Role	Variant	Operators	In service	Notes
Tanker
Airbus A330 MRTT	France / Germany / Spain / United Kingdom	Tanker / transporter / MEDEVAC	A330-200 MRTT	MMF; Belgium; Czechia; Denmark; Finland; Germany; Luxembourg> Netherlands; Norway; Sweden	10 (+ 2 on order)	Based at the Eindhoven Air Base in the Netherlands. History of the programme (nations joining and aircraft orders): July 2016, multinational fleet created by the Netherlands and Luxembourg, 2 aircraft ordered.; September 2017, Germany and Norway join the fleet, 5 aircraft ordered.; February 2018, Belgium joins the fleet, 1 aircraft ordered.; September 2020, 1 aircraft ordered, Luxembourg expands its participation.; March 2023, 1 aircraft ordered, Belgium expands its participation.; June 2025, Denmark and Sweden join the fleet, 2 aircraft ordered.; July 2026, Finland joins the fleet.; One of the MRTT aircraft of the Multinational MRTT Fleet comes with the MEDEVAC kits. The kit includes 6 ICU, 16 stretchers and 21 chairs for medical support.
Transport
Boeing C-17 Globemaster III	United States	Strategic transport aircraft	C-17A	SAC; Bulgaria; Estonia; Finland; Hungary; Lithuania; Netherlands; Norway; Poland; Romania; Slovenia; Sweden; United States	3	Based at Pápa Air Base in Hungary.
Tanker
Northrop Grumman RQ-4 Global Hawk	United States	HALE; UCAV; ISR	RQ-4D Phoenix - block 40	AGS (Bulgaria; Czechia; Denmark; Estonia; Germany; Italy; Latvia; Lithuania; Luxembourg; Norway; Poland; Romania; Slovakia; Slovenia; United Kingdom; United States)	5	

=== Satellites ===
Model	Origin	Role	Variant	In service	Notes
Communication satellites
ASBM-1	United States	Communication satellite	–	2	Satellites launched the 11 August 2024 by a Falcon 9 from the Vanderberg Space Force base. Civilian and military satellites, developed to improve the communications of ships, aircraft, research stations and military operations around the North Pole up to a latitude of 65° North. Both satellites are on the same Three Apogee Period orbit, with a 63° inclination, and separated by 8 hours. The satellites were manufactured by Northrop Grumman for Space Norway.
ASBM-2	United States	Communication satellite	–	2	Satellites launched the 11 August 2024 by a Falcon 9 from the Vanderberg Space Force base. Civilian and military satellites, developed to improve the communications of ships, aircraft, research stations and military operations around the North Pole up to a latitude of 65° North. Both satellites are on the same Three Apogee Period orbit, with a 63° inclination, and separated by 8 hours. The satellites were manufactured by Northrop Grumman for Space Norway.
Surveillance
NorSat-3 / NorSat-4	Canada	Maritime surveillance micro-satellites	–	2	Equipment: Passive radio frequency sensor; AIS receivers; Navigation radar detector
Kongsberg N3X	Norway	Maritime surveillance micro-satellites	–	3 (+3 on order)	Three launched in 2025 and in service since then. The constellation is owned and operated by Kongsberg, and the data supplied to the government and commercial users. Used both by the military and the civilian Norwegian government (Norwegian Coastal Administration, Directorate of Fisheries and Norwegian Customs). Equipment: Passive radio frequency sensor; AIS receivers; Navigation radar detector
AOS	Norway	Maritime surveillance micro satellite	AOS-D	0 (+1 on order)	To be launched from Andøya Space in 2028, by ISAR Aeropace with their Spectrum rocket. The satellites are made by EIDEL (communications) and Kongsberg (spacecraft).
AOS	Norway	Maritime surveillance micro satellite	AOS-P	0 (+1 on order)	To be launched from Andøya Space in 2028, by ISAR Aeropace with their Spectrum rocket. The satellites are made by EIDEL (communications) and Kongsberg (spacecraft).

=== Retired aircraft ===
Previous aircraft flown included the Dassault Falcon 20, F-16 Fighting Falcon, North American F-86K, Republic F-84G, F-104 Starfighter, Northrop F-5, Lockheed T-33, Fairchild PT-26, Catalina PB5Y-A, Douglas C-47, DHC-3 Otter, Noorduyn Norseman, Cessna O-1, Bell UH-1B, Bell 47G, P-3 Orion, NHIndustries NH90 and the Westland Sea King and Westland Lynx helicopters.

== Ranks ==
=== Commissioned officer ranks ===
The rank insignia of commissioned officers.

NATO code	OF-10	OF-9	OF-8	OF-7	OF-6	OF-5	OF-4	OF-3	OF-2	OF-1
Royal Norwegian Air Force
Royal Norwegian Air Force		General	Generalløytnant	Generalmajor	Brigader	Oberst	Oberstløytnant	Major	Kaptein	Løytnant	Fenrik

=== Other ranks ===
The rank insignia of non-commissioned officers and enlisted personnel.

NATO code	OR-9	OR-8	OR-7	OR-6	OR-5		OR-4	OR-3	OR-2	OR-1
Royal Norwegian Air Force
Royal Norwegian Air Force	Sersjantmajor	Kommandérsersjant	Stabssersjant	Oversersjant	Vingsersjant	Sersjant	Ledende spesialist	Spesialist	Visespesialist	Ledende flysoldat	Flysoldat

== See also ==
- Free Norwegian forces
- List of military aircraft of Norway
- List of air forces
- Heavy Airlift Wing
- Strategic Airlift Capability

== Bibliography ==
- Owers, Colin (Spring 1994). "Fokker's Fifth: The C.V Multi-role Biplane". Air Enthusiast. No. 53. pp. 60–68. ISSN 0143-5450.
