= Cassini (CubeSat mission) =

European small satellite mission for technology demonstration

- Mission type: Technology demonstration
- Operator: European Union; European Space Agency (Netherlands) ISISPACE
- Website: www.isispace.nl/project/cassini-6uxl-satellites/

Spacecraft properties
- Manufacturer: ISISPACE

Start of mission
- Launch date: 2026 (planned)
- Rocket: Spectrum
- Launch site: (Norway) Andøya Space
- Contractor: (Germany) Isar Aerospace

Cassini is a rideshare technology demonstration satellite mission under development by the Dutch company ISISPACE with the support of the Flight Ticket Initiative, a collaboration between EU and the European Space Agency (ESA).

The three 6UXL CubeSat-type small satellites will be launched together on a single flight of the Spectrum rocket into low Earth orbit, where they will perform multiple unrelated technological experiments in satellite technology, propulsion, and communication for various European organizations.

Each satellite is equipped with deployable solar panels, UHF/VHF communications, and S-band downlink for payload data. Initial design is for a one-year mission lifetime with potential extension.

The mission completed its critical design review in June 2024 and is expected to launch in 2026.
