= ΣYNDEO‑3 =

European technology demonstration satellite

- Mission type: Technology demonstration
- Operator: European Union; European Space Agency

Spacecraft properties
- Bus: Hammerhead
- Manufacturer: (Belgium) Redwire

Start of mission
- Launch date: Q4 2026 (planned)
- Rocket: Spectrum
- Launch site: (Norway) Andøya Space
- Contractor: (Germany) Isar Aerospace

ΣYNDEO‑3 is a future European technology demonstration satellite built by Redwire in Kruibeke, Belgium, for the In-Orbit Demonstration and In-Orbit Validation (IOD/IOV) programme funded by the European Union and managed by the European Space Agency (ESA). The satellite is based on Redwire's Hammerhead platform (derived from PROBA) and carries 10 payloads funded by the European Commission and developed by institutions and companies in Spain, France, Germany, Italy, and Luxembourg. ΣYNDEO‑3 is expected to launch in late 2026 on a Spectrum rocket developed by the German company Isar Aerospace.

== See also ==
- List of European Space Agency programmes and missions
