= Arctic Ocean Surveillance =

Norwegian and European initiative for maritime surveillance from space

- Manufacturer: Kongsberg, EIDEL
- Country of origin: Norway; European Space Agency

Production
- On order: 2
- Launched: 0
- Maiden launch: 2028 (planned)

Related spacecraft
- Launch vehicle: Spectrum

Arctic Ocean Surveillance (AOS) is an initiative by the Norwegian Space Agency (NOSA) and the European Space Agency (ESA) to develop satellites for strengthening Norway's maritime monitoring in the Arctic. It is part of the Arctic Surveillance Programme (ASP) established by the Norwegian Coastal Administration, Armed Forces, Defence Research Institute, and Space Centre in 2023. Its goals are to monitor illegal fishing, support search and rescue operations, and conduct maritime surveillance in remote areas.

The development of the first two satellites, the Arctic Ocean Surveillance Demo (AOS-D) and the Arctic Ocean Surveillance Precursor (AOS-P), is supported through the ESA's optional General Support Technology Programme (GSTP). AOS-D and AOS-P are expected to launch on a Spectrum rocket, developed by the German company Isar Aerospace, from the Andøya Spaceport in Norway in 2028. AOS-P is being built by Kongsberg Defence & Aerospace and AOS-D by EIDEL.

== See also ==
- List of European Space Agency programmes and missions
- Breizh Reconnaissance Orbiter
- Atlantic Constellation
- MICE-1
