= FramSat-1 =

Norwegian technology demonstration satellite

- Mission type: Technology demonstration
- Operator: (Norway) NTNU
- COSPAR ID: 2026-203B
- Website: orbitntnu.com/projects/FramSat-1

Start of mission
- Launch date: 5 September 2026
- Rocket: Spectrum
- Launch site: (Norway) Andøya Space
- Contractor: (Germany) Isar Aerospace
- FramSat-1 mission patch Fly Your Satellite!

FramSat-1 is a technology demonstration satellite developed by Orbit NTNU, a student team from the Norwegian University of Science and Technology, with the support of the Fly Your Satellite! programme of the European Space Agency (ESA). The 1U CubeSat-type small satellite was designed, apart from supporting education, to test an experimental sun sensor developed by Eidsvoll Electronics (EIDEL) for use in satellites and sounding rockets. FramSat-1 was launched from Andøya Spaceport to low Earth orbit on 5 September 2026 on the "Onward and Upward" flight of the Spectrum rocket, the first successful orbital launch from West European soil, thus also becoming the first Norwegian satellite launched from Norway. The launch of the satellite was supported by a microlauncher competition funded by ESA and DLR.

== See also ==
- Fram2 – First crewed polar orbit spaceflight
