= CyBEEsat =

German technology demonstration satellite

- Names: TUBSAT-33
- Mission type: Technology demonstration
- Operator: (Germany) TU Berlin

Start of mission
- Launch date: 5 September 2026
- Rocket: Spectrum
- Launch site: (Norway) Andøya Space
- Contractor: (Germany) Isar Aerospace

CyBEEsat is a technology demonstration satellite developed by Technische Universität Berlin (TU Berlin) in collaboration with the University of Potsdam and other partners from Germany. It is TU Berlin's 33rd satellite. This 1U CubeSat-type small satellite was designed to test various innovative spaceflight technologies including ultra-thin perovskite solar cells (ROSI-1) and a cybersecurity-focused open source operating system (RACCOON). CyBEEsat was launched from Andøya Spaceport to low Earth orbit on 5 September 2026 on the "Onward and Upward" flight of the Spectrum rocket, the first successful orbital launch from West European soil. Launch of the satellite was supported by a microlauncher competition funded by ESA and DLR.
