= SpaceTeamSat1 =

Austrian educational satellite

- Operator: (Austria) TU Wien
- Website: spaceteam.at/en/sts1-en

Spacecraft properties
- Bus: 1U CubeSat

Start of mission
- Launch date: 5 September 2026
- Rocket: Spectrum
- Launch site: (Norway) Andøya Space
- Contractor: (Germany) Isar Aerospace

SpaceTeamSat1 is an educational satellite developed by TU Wien Space Team, a student group at the Technical University of Vienna (TU Wien). The purpose of this 1U CubeSat-type small satellite is to provide an in-orbit platform for testing software developed by TU Wien students, as well as to serve the amateur radio community. SpaceTeamSat1 was launched from Andøya Spaceport to low Earth orbit on 5 September 2026 on the "Onward and Upward" flight of the Spectrum rocket, the first successful orbital launch from West European soil.
