= GreenBox =

Series of Austrian technology demonstration satellites

- Manufacturer: R-Space
- Country of origin: Austria
- Website: r-space.at/r-space-greenbox

Specifications
- Bus: CubeSat

Production
- Built: 3
- Launched: 0
- Maiden launch: 2026 (planned)

Related spacecraft
- Launch vehicle: Spectrum

GreenBox is a series of CubeSat-type technology demonstration satellites under development by the Austrian company R-Space with the support of the European Space Agency (ESA). The company is promoting the satellites as part of an "all-in-one solution" for In-Orbit Demonstration and In-Orbit Validation (IOD/IOV) of customer's payloads. The satellites' design features a box-shaped, standardized Payload Accommodation Unit (PAU) which hosts the customer's hardware.

== Satellites ==
=== IOD-1 / AT-Astra ===
The first satellite of the series (AT-Astra/GreenBox-1/IOB-01) is expected to launch in 2026 from Andøya Spaceport to low Earth orbit on a Spectrum rocket.

=== IOD-2 ===
A second Greenbox has been built and is scheduled for launch on a Spectrum in Q2 2027.

=== IOD-3 ===
A third Greenbox is being built also targeting a Q2 2027 launch.
