= Breizh Reconnaissance Orbiter =

French SIGINT satellite constellation

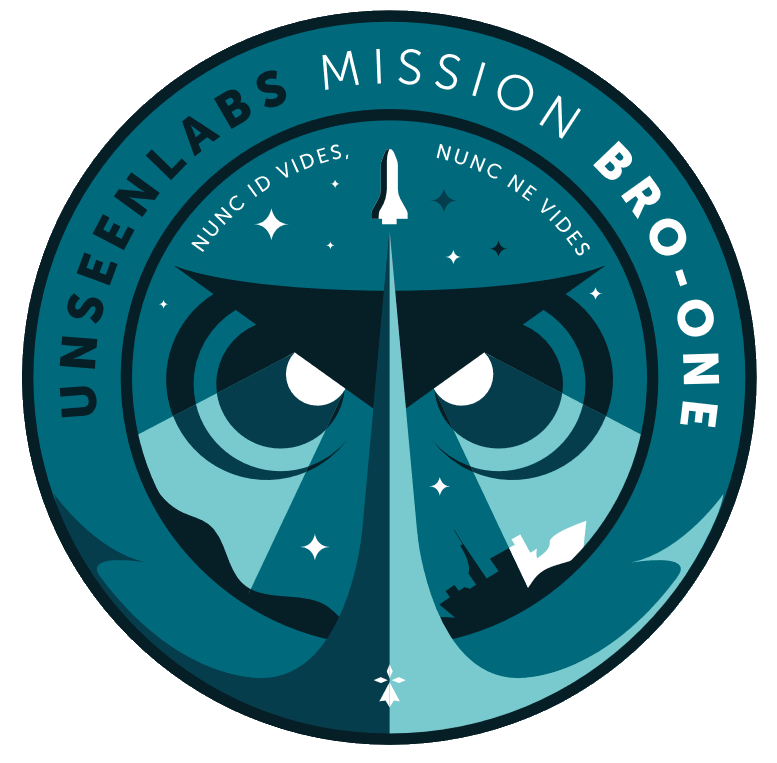
- Manufacturer: GomSpace
- Country of origin: France
- Operator: Unseenlabs
- Applications: SIGINT
- Website: https://unseenlabs.com/en/

Specifications
- Bus: 6U, 8U CubeSat

Production
- Launched: 24
- Maiden launch: 19 August 2019
- Last launch: 1 October 2026

Related spacecraft
- Launch vehicle: Electron, Vega, Falcon 9, H3

Breizh Reconnaissance Orbiter (BRO) is a low Earth orbit satellite constellation developed by the French company Unseenlabs, headquartered in Rennes, Brittany, with the support of the French Ministry of Research and Innovation. BRO is focused on radio frequency spectrum monitoring and signal intelligence for maritime and aerial traffic surveillance. The 6U and 8U CubeSat-type small satellites are built by the Danish company GomSpace.

== Satellites ==
The first BRO satellite, BRO-1, was launched in August 2019 on a Rocket Lab Electron rocket. Satellites number 31 and higher represent the 2nd generation, which extends the system's scope beyond maritime surveillance to support multi-domain awareness including also land and space monitoring.

List of BRO satellites
Name	COSPAR ID	Launch date	Launch vehicle	Note
BRO 1	2019-054A	19 August 2019	Electron	
BRO 2	2020-085M	20 November 2020	Electron	Re-entered atmosphere on 27 November 2024
BRO 3	2020-085Q	20 November 2020	Electron	Re-entered atmosphere on 23 January 2024
BRO 4	2021-073A	17 August 2021	Vega	Re-entered atmosphere on 14 February 2025
BRO 5	2022-002CF	13 January 2022	Falcon 9	
BRO 6	2022-047AE	02 May 2022	Electron	
BRO 7	2022-033T	01 April 2022	Falcon 9	Re-entered atmosphere on 28 June 2025
BRO 8	2023-001C	03 January 2023	Falcon 9	
BRO 9	2023-054H	15 April 2023	Falcon 9	
BRO 10	2023-174CD	11 November 2023	Falcon 9	
BRO 11	2023-174J	11 November 2023	Falcon 9	
BRO 12	2024-043L	4 March 2024	Falcon 9	First 8U CubeSat of the constellation
BRO 13	2024-043K	4 March 2024	Falcon 9	
BRO 14	2024-149CM	16 August 2024	Falcon 9	
BRO 15	2024-149CP	16 August 2024	Falcon 9	
BRO 16	2025-009AX	14 January 2025	Falcon 9	
BRO 18	2025-135Y	23 June 2025	Falcon 9	
BRO 17	2025-276G	28 November 2025	Falcon 9	
BRO 20	2025-276J	28 November 2025	Falcon 9	
BRO 19	2026-067AQ	30 March 2026	Falcon 9	Originally planned for the first H3-30 flight. Moved to Transporter-16.
BRO 21	2026-100G	3 May 2026, 7:00 UTC	Falcon 9	CAS500-2 rideshare mission
BRO 22	2026-132C	12 June 2026, 0:53 UTC	H3	Maiden flight of the H3-30S Variant
BRO 31	2026-156AD	7 July 2026	Falcon 9	Transporter-17. 1st generation 2 satellite
BRO 23	2026-227AA	1 October 2026, 18:32 UTC	Falcon 9	Transporter-18
BRO 32	2026-227AW	1 October 2026, 18:32 UTC	Falcon 9	Transporter-18

== See also ==
- Arctic Ocean Surveillance
- Atlantic Constellation
- MICE-1
