= Spectrum (rocket) =

Two-stage small launch vehicle

- Render of the Spectrum rocket taking off from the launchpad
- Function: Orbital small-lift launch vehicle
- Manufacturer: Isar Aerospace
- Country of origin: Germany

Size
- Height: 28 m (92 ft)
- Diameter: 2 m (6 ft 7 in)
- Stages: 2

Capacity

Payload to LEO
- Mass: 1,000 kg (2,200 lb)

Payload to SSO
- Mass: 700 kg (1,500 lb)

Launch history
- Status: Operational
- Launch sites: Andøya Space (Operational); Guiana Space Centre (Planned); Canso, Nova Scotia, Canada (Planned)
- Total launches: 2
- Success(es): 1
- Failure: 1
- First flight: 30 March 2025
- Last flight: 5 September 2026

First stage
- Powered by: 9 x Aquila
- Propellant: Propane/LOX

Second stage
- Powered by: 1 x Aquila
- Propellant: Propane/LOX

Aquila
- Country of origin: Germany
- Designer: Isar Aerospace
- Manufacturer: Isar Aerospace
- Application: Booster stage engines; Upper stage engine
- Status: Operational

Liquid-fuel engine
- Propellant: LOX / Propane
- Cycle: Gas-generator cycle

Performance
- Thrust, sea-level: 75 kN (17,000 lbf)

Used in
- Spectrum

Spectrum is a two-stage orbital small-lift launch vehicle built by German company Isar Aerospace. Development of the Spectrum commenced during the 2010s. Much of its design has been produced internally. A key target during development was the price point of €10,000 ($11,700) per kg, as well as to be as flexible as possible as to suit a wide variety of payload requirements. Isar Aerospace has arranged to launch Spectrum from both the Andøya Spaceport in Norway and the Guiana Space Centre in French Guiana. Early customers for the launcher include Airbus Defence and Space, the German Aerospace Center (DLR), and Spaceflight, Inc.

Spectrum is the first rocket developed/built in Germany to reach orbit, the first orbital rocket to launch successfully from Western Europe (European rockets had previously only launched from the Kourou spaceport, Russia has launched satellites from the Plesetsk Cosmodrome), and the first privately developed launch vehicle from Europe. Previously, three rockets developed in Germany had crossed the Kármán line (the V-2 in 1944; a rocket by the Berthold-Seliger research and development company in 1963; and the Mapheus sounding rocket in 2009).

== Design ==
Spectrum is a two-stage launch vehicle designed to carry both small- and medium-sized satellites. It has a maximum payload capacity of 1,000 kg (2,200 lb) to low Earth orbit (LEO) or alternatively up to 700 kg (1,500 lb) to a Sun-synchronous orbit (SSO). Isar Aerospace has promoted the launcher as possessing considerable flexibility, better allowing it to fulfill the varying demands of its prospective customers. According to the company, the vast majority of Spectrum's development and manufacturing is in-house, including that of its Aquila engines. It is a relatively compact rocket, in part facilitated by the high energy density of its propellant, which comprises a combination of liquid oxygen and propane. It has been designed to achieve a price point of €10,000 ($11,700) per kg.

The first stage of Spectrum is powered by an arrangement of nine Aquila engines, while the second stage uses a single Aquila engine. This second stage engine is to be equipped with a multi-ignition system, permitting it to be shut down and reignited if the launch profile should require such an arrangement, eliminating the need for an additional kick stage. The propellant is supplied to the engines at high pressure via a turbopump. In March 2023, Isar Aerospace reported having performed 124 hotfires of the Aquila engine during the prior year, these test runs having been performed at Esrange, Sweden; these tests demonstrated greater than anticipated performance with one of these engines being fired on six separate occasions without any intervening refurbishment.

The rocket's structure is made of a single-part carbon composite and is manufactured with an automated process. This lightweight material offers the highest payload performance.

== Launch sites ==
Map of orbital launch sites at the Guiana Space Center, with Spectrum launches being planned to take place at the former Diamant launch site.

=== Andøya Spaceport ===
In April 2021, a 20-year deal was signed by Isar Aerospace for exclusive access to one of the Andøya Space launch pads in Norway. Due to its location, inclinations between 87.4 and 108 degrees can be reached from this launch site, targeting Sun-synchronous and polar orbits.

=== Guiana Space Centre ===
In July 2022, Isar Aerospace announced that it had been selected by France's National Centre for Space Studies (CNES) to conduct launch operations at the former Kourou Diamant Launch Site at the Guiana Space Centre, which had been last used for an orbital launch in 1975. The low latitude of this launch site allows it to be used for equatorial and medium inclination orbits. The first launch to take place from this launch site had been scheduled for 2024. By 2025, however, Isar delayed the "start of operations" at Kourou to 2027 at the earliest. As of October 2026 Isar has not yet submitted the development contract necessary to retrofit the Diamant pad for Spectrum launches.

=== Spaceport Nova Scotia ===
On 7 July 2026, Isar signed a deal with Maritime Launch Services (MLS) to develop a purpose built Spectrum launch site at Spaceport Nova Scotia (SNS). The plans for the launch pad where expected 1 September, the handover of the pad to Isar on 1 November 2026, with the pad to be operational on 31 December 2027. The US$3.75 million quarterly lease will last for a 10-year term with two optional additional 5-year terms.

On 1 September it was announced that Isar and MLS could not agree on a finalized design and extended the deadline to do so to 15 September. Following the 2nd launch of Spectrum on 5 September, Isar reiterated that they are targeting launches at SNS in 2028 as their first outside Norway. On 14 September Isar and MLS announced that they had finalized the statement of work and programmatic milestones for the launch site, and had begun building infrastructure towards the pad location. On 15 September American Small-Sat ride-share provider SEOPS announced that they had purchased 5 spectrum launches in 2028 for their Waymaker missions, with an unspecified number of these launches to be at SNS.

== Launches ==
In 2021, multiple launch arrangements using Spectrum were announced by companies such as Airbus Defence and Space, EnduroSat, and Astrocast. In December 2021, Isar Aerospace and the German Aerospace Center (DLR) announced that a total of seven small satellites would comprise the institutional payload to be carried on Spectrum's first flight. In early 2023, Spectrum's first American customer, Spaceflight, Inc., agreed to terms for a dedicated launch from Andøya during 2026 along with an option for a 2025 launch.

In December 2021, the first launch of Spectrum was anticipated to take place sometime in 2022. By March 2023, Isar Aerospace was reportedly aiming for the first flight to occur sometime during the second half of 2023. However, by November 2023, this milestone was postponed again to 2024. Plans to launch the first rocket in 2024 were delayed until an exhaustive slate of tests could be performed.

On 21 February 2025, a static fire test of Spectrum was performed that reportedly confirmed that the rocket was ready. One month later, a launch license was issued by the Norwegian Civil Aviation Authority (NCAA). Shortly thereafter Isar Aerospace announced that they were in the process of assembling the second and third Spectrum. The first launch attempt on 24 March 2025 was scrubbed due to high winds.

On 30 March 2025 at 12:30 pm local time, the rocket was launched from Norway for the first time; however, it lost control several seconds later, causing it to fall into the sea and explode. An investigation found that the rocket's vent valve had opened unexpectedly, leading to a loss of attitude control at the start of the roll maneuver. The rocket did not carry a payload.

A second launch on 5 September 2026 was successful, deploying several small satellites into a Sun-synchronous orbit. The flight carried 5 academic cubesats and 1 undeployable payload to qualify Spectrum for future commercial satellite launches. A third launch carrying its first commercial payload, the AT-Astra satellite built by Austrian company R-Space, is targeting a launch window from November 26, 2026 to February 17, 2027.

== Launch history ==
=== Past launches ===
==== 2025 ====
Flight No.	Date and time (UTC)	Launch site	Payload	Orbit	Launch outcome
1	30 March 2025, 11:30	Andøya Spaceport, Norway	None	Failure	Failure
1	Maiden/demonstration flight of Spectrum, 'Going Full Spectrum'. 18 seconds into flight, control of the vehicle was lost.				

==== 2026 ====
Flight No.	Date and time (UTC)	Launch site	Payload	Orbit	Launch outcome
2	5 September 2026, 20:12	Andøya Spaceport, Norway	(Germany) CyBEEsat, (Slovenia) TriSat-S, (Bulgaria) Platform 6, (Norway) FramSat-1, (Austria) SpaceTeamSat1, (Germany) Let It Go	500 km, SSO	Success
2	Second test flight, "Onward and Upward". This launch carried five CubeSats and one non-separable experiment as part of the European Space Agency (ESA)'s "Boost!" program: CyBEEsat (TU Berlin); TriSat-S (University of Maribor); Platform 6 (EnduroSat); FramSat-1 (NTNU); SpaceTeamSat1 (TU Wien Space Team); Let It Go (Dcubed, non-separable experiment). A 25 March launch attempt was aborted by check system, and the 9 April launch was scrubbed due to a leak. Another launch attempt in on 15 June was aborted due to issues in the fluid system. First German rocket to reach orbit. First night launch of Spectrum.				

=== Upcoming launches ===
==== 2026 ====
Flight No.	Date and time (UTC)	Launch site	Payload	Planned orbit	Customer
3	NET 26 November 2026	Andøya Spaceport, Norway	(Austria) AT-Astra/GreenBox-1/IOD-01	450 km, SSO	R-Space
3	First commercial launch. Dedicated launch for R-Space; the first Austrian commercial satellite. Two experiments are developed by the Austrian companies ENPULSION and SunBooster while another is developed by the Portuguese company Synopsis Planet.				
TBA	NET 2026	Andøya Spaceport, Norway	(Germany) (United States) Pelican	TBA	Planet Labs Germany
TBA	A Pelican-type Earth observation satellite built by the Berlin-based German subsidiary of Planet Labs for the German government.				
TBA	NET 2026	Andøya Spaceport, Norway	(European Union) ΣYNDEO-3	LEO	ESA
TBA	ΣYNDEO-3, built by Redwire Corporation for ESA and EU, will carry 10 different technological demonstration payloads provided by organizations from Spain, France, Germany, Italy, Luxembourg, and the European Commission.				
TBA	NET 2026	Andøya Spaceport, Norway	(European Union) Cassini	TBA	ESA
TBA	The Cassini mission, led by ESA and funded by EU, will carry three 6UXL CubeSats with each satellite hosting multiple experiments from different European organizations.				

==== 2027 ====
Flight No.	Date and time (UTC)	Launch site	Payload	Planned orbit	Customer
TBA	NET 2027	Andøya Spaceport, Norway	(Japan) Aoba	TBA	ElevationSpace
TBA	Dedicated launch for ElevationSpace.				
TBA	NET 2027	Andøya Spaceport, Norway	(Japan) ADRAS-J2	TBA	Astroscale
TBA	Dedicated launch for Astroscale. ADRAS-J2 is a space debris removal mission developed for JAXA.				
TBA	NET Q2 2027	Andøya Spaceport, Norway	(Austria) GreenBox-2/IOD-02	450 km, SSO	R-Space
TBA	Second dedicated launch for R-Space.				
TBA	NET Q2 2027	Andøya Spaceport, Norway	(European Union) Tom & Jerry	TBA	ESA
TBA	Tom & Jerry, led by ESA and funded by EU, will consist of two satellites to demonstrate a space debris cleanup mission.				

==== 2028 ====
Flight No.	Date and time (UTC)	Launch site	Payload	Planned orbit	Customer
TBA	NET 2028	Andøya Spaceport, Norway	(Norway) AOS-D & AOS-P	SSO	NOSA
TBA	Two satellites to be launched for the Norwegian Space Agency's Arctic Ocean Surveillance program. AOS-D will demonstrate maritime monitoring technologies and AOS-D will be the first operational satellite in a system to track maritime activities in the Arctic.				
TBA	NET 2028	Andøya Spaceport, Norway	(United States) SEOPS LaunchLock Prime	LEO	SEOPS
TBA	Dedicated multi-customer payload ride-share launch managed by SEOPS.				
TBA	NET 2028	Andøya Spaceport, Norway	(United Kingdom) (Japan) ELSA-M	TBA	Astroscale UK
TBA	Dedicated launch for Astroscale. ELSA-M is a space debris-removal vehicle developed for Eutelsat, ESA, and UKSA.				
TBA	NET 2028	TBA (Note: Either Andøya Spaceport or Spaceport Nova Scotia.)	(United States) SEOPS LaunchLock Prime	TBA	SEOPS
TBA	Dedicated multi-customer payload ride-share launch managed by SEOPS.				
TBA	NET 2028	TBA	(United States) SEOPS LaunchLock Prime	TBA	SEOPS
TBA	Dedicated multi-customer payload ride-share launch managed by SEOPS.				
TBA	NET 2028	TBA	(United States) SEOPS LaunchLock Prime	TBA	SEOPS
TBA	Dedicated multi-customer payload ride-share launch managed by SEOPS.				
TBA	NET 2028	TBA	(United States) SEOPS LaunchLock Prime	TBA	SEOPS
TBA	Dedicated multi-customer payload ride-share launch managed by SEOPS.				
TBA	NET 2028	TBA	(United States) SEOPS LaunchLock Prime	TBA	SEOPS
TBA	Dedicated multi-customer payload ride-share launch managed by SEOPS.				

== Statistics of the launcher ==
=== Launch outcomes ===
- Loss before launch
- Loss during flight
- Partial failure
- Success (commercial and government)

=== Number of launches per site ===
- Andøya Spaceport
- Guiana Space Centre
- Nova Scotia Spaceport
