= Isar Aerospace =

German aerospace company

- Render of the Spectrum rocket taking off from the launchpad
- Type: Privately held company
- Industry: Aerospace
- Founded: March 2018; 8 years ago
- Founder: Daniel Metzler; Markus Brandl; Josef Peter Fleischmann
- Headquarters: Ottobrunn, Germany
- Products: Spectrum
- Number of employees: 400+ (2024)
- Website: isaraerospace.com

Isar Aerospace is a German aerospace company based in Ottobrunn near Munich. It was founded in 2018, named after the river that flows through Munich.

The company developed Spectrum, a two-stage, liquid-fueled rocket designed to launch up to 1,000 kilograms to low Earth orbit. Isar Aerospace intends to manufacture 80% of the rocket themselves, using primarily technology from the tech firms in the area surrounding Munich.

On 5 September 2026, the company's second launch of Spectrum reached orbit and successfully deployed its payloads, making it the first successful orbital flight from Northern Europe, making Andøya Spaceport the second active spaceport in Europe after Plesetsk Cosmodrome and third European spaceport in history after Kapustin Yar launch facility and Plesetsk Cosmodrome.

== Funding ==
In 2018 Isar Aerospace received first angel investment from early SpaceX leader Bulent Altan and others. In April 2020 Isar Aerospace closed US$17M in Series A funding led by Earlybird and Airbus Ventures to build its space platform. In December 2020, the company got an additional €75 million ($91 million) in funding led by Lakestar and with participation of HV Capital and Ann-Kristin and Paul Achleitner as well as existing investors.

In July 2021, Porsche SE acquired a small stake in Isar Aerospace. The financial terms of the deal are not disclosed, but it is known that in the new round of financing, the startup raised about $75 million. Porsche explained of its investment that Isar Aerospace had great potential to become a leading European manufacturer of launch vehicles.

In March 2023, the startup raised a $165 million Series C from 7-Industries Holding, Bayern Kapital, Lombard Odier and existing investors. An additional $70 million was raised in 2024 from the NATO Innovation Fund and others as an extension of an earlier Series C round. The total funding has exceeded 400 million euros.

== Partnerships ==
In April 2021, Isar Aerospace, signed a contract with Andøya Space to lease a launch pad. The 20-year deal allows the company to launch their Spectrum launch vehicle from Andøya Spaceport.

In January 2022 the company won European Commission's European Innovation Council (EIC) Horizon Prize "Low-Cost Space Launch", which included a grant of 10 million Euros. In July 2022, Isar Aerospace announced that the French space agency, the CNES, selected the startup to be the first private company to launch from the Guiana Space Centre, in French Guiana. The company will use the launchpad formerly used by Diamant.

In November 2022, Isar Aerospace and Exotrail signed a multiple launch services agreement. The launch vehicle Spectrum will launch Exotrail's spacevan vehicle on several firm launches to low Earth Orbit (LEO) and geostationary transfer orbits (GTO) from Isar Aerospace's launch sites. In March 2026, Isar Aerospace would sign a launch service agreement with Astroscale, which will see the launch of the ELSA-M in a In-Orbit Demonstration mission.

In May 2026, Isar Aerospace established a cooperation with the German maritime defence company TKMS as part of their (successful) bid for the Canadian Patrol Submarine Project. Isar Aerospace would help establish sovereign Canadian access to space. Later in May 2026, Isar Aerospace has signed a letter of intent with Maritime Launch Services to conduct rocket launches from their Nova Scotia spaceport. On 7 July 2026, Isar Aerospace signed a 10-year agreement with Maritime Launch Services including a launch pad and other facilities needed for launching Spectrum from Spaceport Nova Scotia.

On 1 September 2026, the company signed its second launch service agreement with Astroscale, which will see the launch of their active debris removal mission ADRAS-J2 onboard a Spectrum launch vehicle, with the launch targeted to happen between 2027 and 2028 from Andøya Spaceport. On 15 September 2026, after the first successful flight of Spectrum, Isar Aerospace signed a multiple launch service agreement with SEOPS for additional five dedicated launches between 2028 and 2030.

== Test launches ==
=== Going Full Spectrum ===
On 30 March 2025, the inaugural launch of Isar Aerospace's Spectrum rocket took place under the mission name "Going Full Spectrum". Launching from Andøya Spaceport, the liftoff was successful; however, the rocket experienced an anomaly 30 seconds into flight and was terminated, causing it to fall back to the earth and explode upon impact. An investigation found that the rocket's vent valve had opened unexpectedly, leading to a loss of attitude control at the start of the roll maneuver.

=== Onward and Upward ===
The second test flight of Spectrum, dubbed “Onward and Upward,” was first slated to launch 25 March 2026 from Andøya Spaceport, but was interrupted by a fishing boat that was stuck within the safety zone. The launch was postponed to no earlier than 9 April 2026, and was then delayed due to a leak in a composite overwrapped pressure vessel. The launch was again pushed back on 15 June 2026, due to detected 'off-nominal behaviour in the vehicle's fluid systems'. From maritime safety notices sent out by the Norwegian Coastal Administration, it was noted that Isar Aerospace gained a launch window from 4 September to 10 September 2026, with a launch attempt made on 4 September 2026, although it would once again be pushed back due to high winds speeds, up to 24 knots, grounding the Spectrum rocket. The mission was intended as a qualification flight and was the first flight of Spectrum to carry payloads, including several CubeSats and an experiment selected under the European Space Agency’s Boost! program.

Isar Aerospace would successfully launch this second test flight of Spectrum into orbit on 5 September 2026, making it the first successful orbital flight from Northern Europe, and the first to be done so by a commercial company launching from Europe. The mission carried five CubeSats from universities and companies, together with one experiment: TriSat-S (University of Maribor and SkyLabs); FramSat-1 (NTNU SpaceTeam); Sat1 (TU Wien Space Team); CyBEEsat (TU Berlin); Platform 6 (EnduroSat) and Let It Go (experiment, Dcubed).

== Commercial launches ==
Isar's first commercial Spectrum launch carrying R-Space's AT-Astra, is currently targeting a launch window NET November 26, 2026 through February 17, 2027 per a Norwegian aviation notice.

== See also ==
- Rocket Factory Augsburg
- HyImpulse
- WARR (TUM)
