= Andøya Space =

Norwegian rocket launch facility

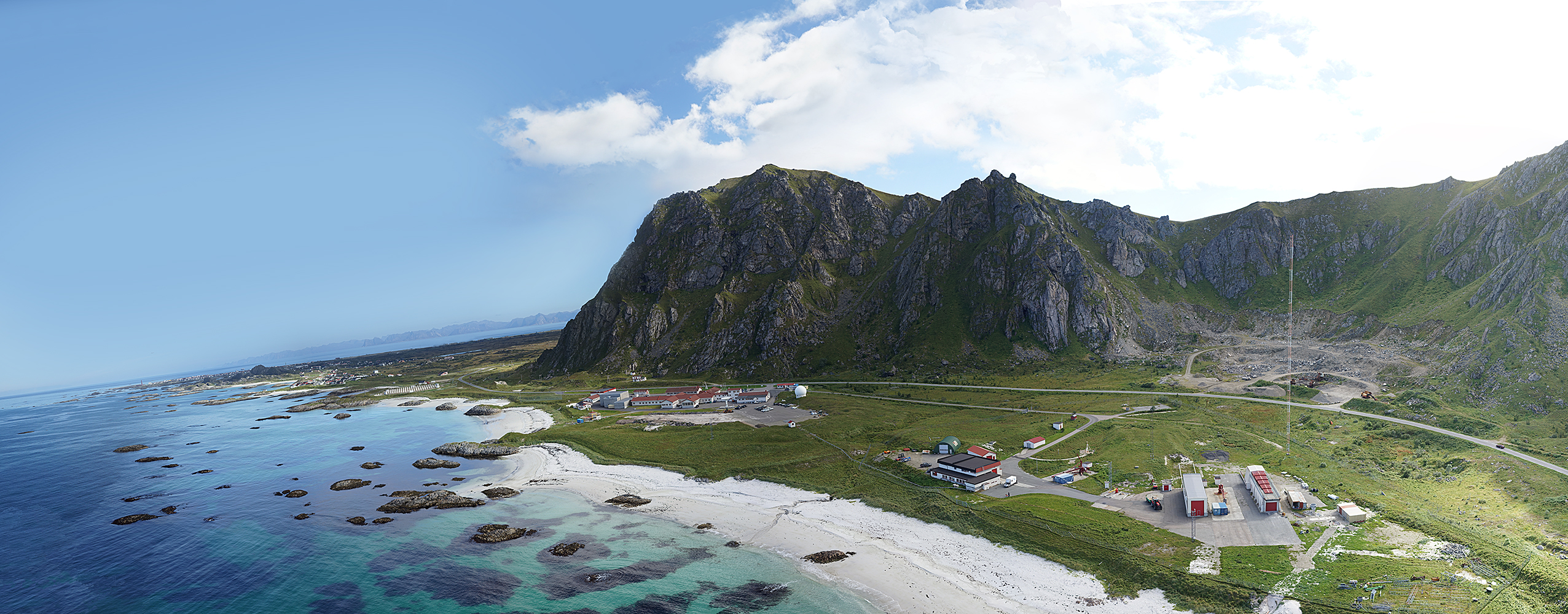
- View over Oksebåsen, the area Andøya Space is located. Photo taken from a multirotor.

Agency overview
- Abbreviation: ASC
- Formed: 1962; 64 years ago
- Type: Space agency
- CEO: Ketil Olsen
- Owners: Royal Norwegian Ministry of Trade and Industry and Kongsberg Defence & Aerospace
- Employees: 100
- Website: http://andoyaspace.no

Map
- Location within Norway Location within Nordland

Andøya Space, formerly Andøya Space Center, is a rocket launch site, rocket range, and spaceport on Andøya island (the northernmost in the Vesterålen archipelago) in Andøy Municipality in Nordland county, Norway. Since 1962, over 1,200 sounding and sub-orbital rockets of various configurations have been launched from the site.

In September 2026, the site hosted its first successful orbital launch, when Isar Aerospace launched its Spectrum rocket from Andøya Spaceport, making it first launch from Northern Europe, making it second active spaceport in Europe after Plesetsk Cosmodrome and third European spaceport in history after Plesetsk and Kapustin Yar.

Andøya Space is a civilian, limited liability company with its ownership split between two groups: 90% by the Royal Norwegian Ministry of Trade and Industry, and 10% by Kongsberg Defence Systems company. It operates on a commercial basis. Andøya Space also supports the SvalRak launch facility in Ny-Ålesund, Svalbard to the north. The facility has provided operations for both ESA, NASA, JAXA, and DLR missions and related scientific research.

== Background ==
In 1952 NATO began construction of the Andøya Air Station near Andenes displacing the village of Haugnes with the station becoming operational in 1957. In January 1960 the Norwegian Research Council for Science and Technology formed a space science exploratory committee to explore how Norway should participate in international collaboration within the field. To this end later that year physicist Bjørn Landmark of the Norwegian Defence Research Establishment (FFI) and NASA scientist S. Fred Singer would survey northern Norway for a suitable sounding-rocket launch location with the committee arguing that such a range would attract foreign space scientists and investments.

The pair ultimately selected the bay of Oksebåsen (Ox Pasture) due to the aforementioned airfield allowing the easy transport of rockets and the unobstructed northern launch corridor over the Norwegian Sea that saw little maritime traffic. The location would be dubbed the Andøya Rocket Range (ARR) with the Norwegian government announcing it would conduct basic research for peaceful purposes.

== Sounding rocket history ==
=== Ferdinand 1 (1962) ===
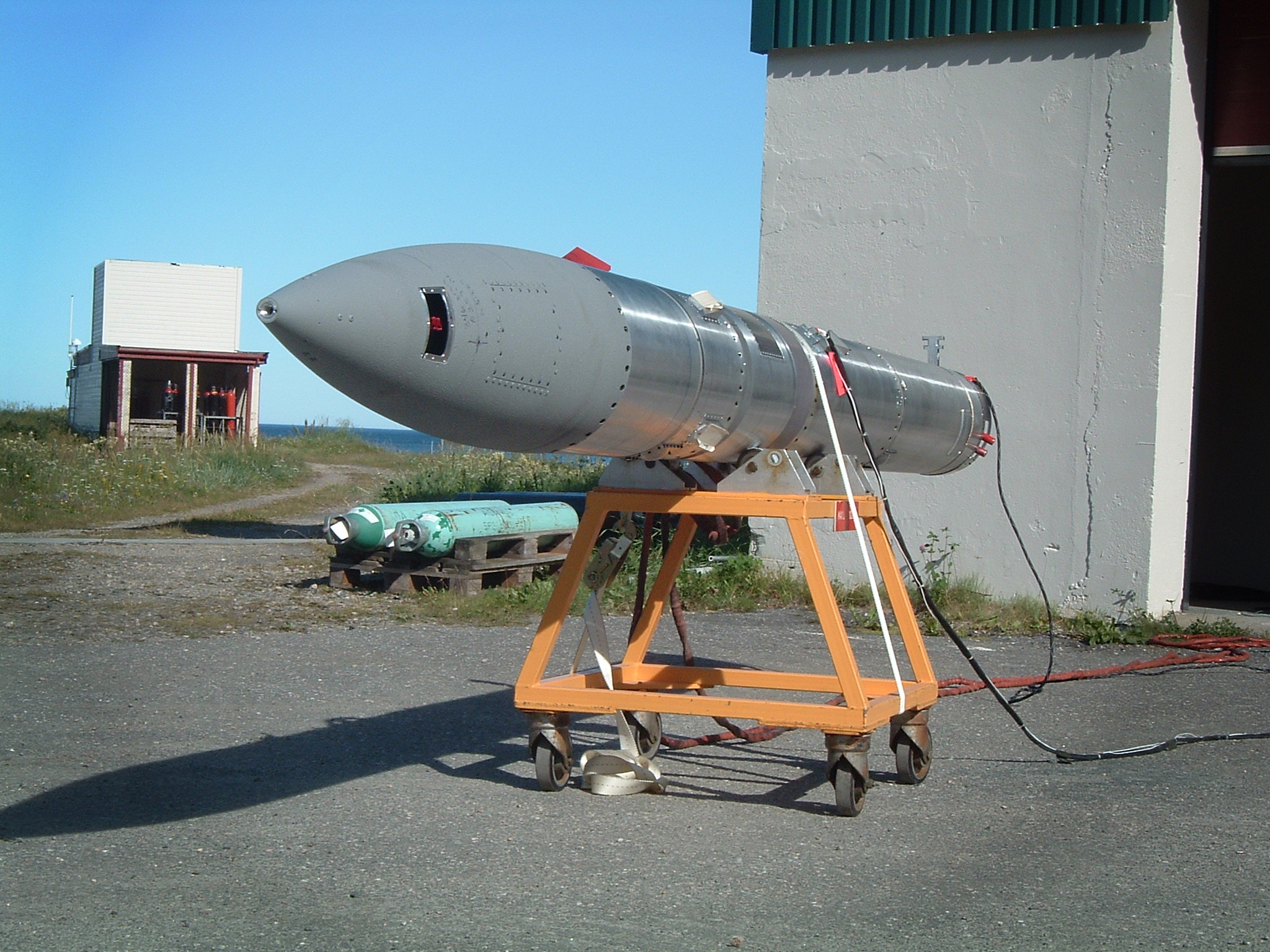
Sounding rocket payload prepared to be launched from Andoya Rocket Range in 2007.

The first launch at the range would be the August 18, 1962, launch of Ferdinand 1, a joint Norwegian-Danish project alongside the Danish Ionosphereic Laboratory and in collaboration with NASA. Building off the name Oksebåsen Norwegian scientists named the rocket "Ferdinand" after the story of the peaceful bull that did not like to fight but would rather sit in the meadow smelling the flowers. The name was chosen to indicate that Andøya Rocket Range only had peaceful intentions as this was during the Cold War.

Ferdinand-1 was a NIKE-Cajun two-stage rocket that carried two instruments in its payload. The purpose of the launch was to do measurements in the ionosphere, where charged particles from the Sun ionize the atoms. The process is most intense in the polar ionosphere, and is important not only for the Northern Lights, but also for long-range radio communication, because the free electrons reflect the radio waves. The goal was to explore the possibility of improving long-range radio communication.

The rocket was 7.7 m (25 ft) long, had a total weight of 698 kg (1,539 lb) and a maximum speed of 6,760 km/h (4,200 mph). It reached a height of 102 km (63 mi) into the atmosphere. Launching and collecting data after the first rocket was considered a success. Ferdinand 1 became the first of a number of successful rocket launches from Andøya.

=== Early development (1962-1966) ===
NASA would supply a simple telemetry station while a small launcher would be developed and built by the Christian Michelsen Institute (CMI) in Bergen. In parallel to the rocket range Professor Harald Trefall of the University of Bergen established a launch and telemetry station at the site for stratospheric balloons with the first deployment taking place just a month after the launch of Ferdinand 1.

In 1965 operations at ARR would be restructured with the Royal Norwegian Council for Scientific and Industrial Research taking over and forming a new department for space activities which would take over day-to-day operations. Initial operations would be carried out mostly by the FFI and universities with key early researchers being: Bjørn Landmark, Egil Strømsø, Egil Eriksen, Jan Trøim, Odd Dahl, and Asbjørn Søreide.

=== Scandinavian collaboration (1966-1972) ===
Starting in 1960 ARR would be Norway's contribution to the Scandinavian Working Group for Space Research a joint sounding rocket working group with Sweden and Denmark. Sweden and Denmark where also members of the newly formed European Space Research Organisation (ESRO) and where hesitant to launch sounding rockets out of ARR due to Norway not being a member arguing instead for launches out of Sweden's Esrange site. However, Esrange was not yet fully operational, leading to ESRO relenting and splitting their first three campaigns of sounding rocket launches from 1966 to 1972 with 40 weeks at Esrange, and then 40 weeks at ARR.

From 1969 to 1970 the range would undergo an extensive technical rework to accommodate larger rockets and more complex payloads securing a loan of 4.5 krone for development of new buildings, launchers, and a larger, domestic, telemetry station. By 1972 the ARR had a staff of 18 people with Arne Gundersen serving as ARR's head from 1967 to 1989. With the completion of Esrange in 1972 ESRO would discontinue their operations at ARR.

=== International growth and privatization (1972-1997) ===
Despite the conclusion of their project with ESRO, ARR's expansion made it an attractive launch site for rockets from groups from the United States, Austria, Germany, the United Kingdom, France and other Scandinavian countries due to its proximity to the north pole. An extensive German-Norwegian collaboration program existed with the German Aerospace Center (DLR) where the DLR would supply rocket motors for Norwegian designed and built rockets launched out of ARR. CMI, FFI, DLR and NASA remained the site's top users for decades.

In 1976 a larger more modern mission control center was built and in 1989 Kolbjørn Adolfsen became head of ARR and oversaw the construction of an education center and viewing stands. In 1990 a collaboration between DLR, CMI, and FFI resulted in the creation of sea-recoverable small rockets allowing rocket re-use. By 1996 ARR was launching 20 ton rockets.

In 1987 Norway joined the European Space Agency (ESA) and created the Norwegian Space Centre (NSC) with responsibilities for Norwegian space activities being transferred to them. Later that year ARR was established as a private company, owned 90% by the NSC and 10% by Kongsberg Defence and Aerospace. ARR would continue to oversee, and profit from, all operations at their launch facilities.

==== Norwegian Rocket Incident (1995) ====
In 1995, a Black Brant sounding rocket launched from Andøya caused a high alert in Russia, known as the Norwegian Rocket Incident. The Russians thought it might be a nuclear missile launched from an American submarine. President Boris Yeltsin was alerted for a possible counter strike, when the Russians understood that it was not heading towards Russia.

Russia was informed in advance about the launch, but this information was lost in the Russian bureaucracy, and never reached the radar operators; only seafarers were notified.

=== Expansion and the Svalbard Rocket Range (1997-2014) ===
With the success of operations at ARR Adolfsen opened a second launch site even closer to the North Pole at Ny-Ålesund, Svalbard, enabling scientists to launch sounding rockets straight in the polar cusp, where the Earth's magnetic field lines converge.

A ground-based, lidar observatory, ALOMAR (Arctic Lidar Observatory for Middle Atmosphere Research) opened in 1994, and can help atmospheric research in the Arctic. The range is also host of northern Europe's largest VHF-radar.

By the late 90s almost all rockets launched from ARR where built by Norwegian groups at FFI, CMU, and universities, but the payloads where for foreign groups under the "hotel payload" model, an early form of rideshare.

With the development of the second site at Svalbard, most of the smaller, shorter-range rockets would launch there, allowing rocket groups at ARR to focus on larger, higher-altitude rockets. In 2003 the Andøya Test Center (ATC) was opened to test rockets, missiles, and unmanned airborne systems for the Norwegian Armed Forces as well as private military and space contractors.

In 2005 Adolfsen retired and was succeeded by Odd Roger Enoksen an experienced politician from the Centre Party, who had to take an immediate 2 year leave of absence to serve as Minister of Energy leaving Torstein Rødseth to serve as acting director and smooth the transition.

=== Andøya Space Center (2014-present) ===
The space center changed its name from Andøya Rocket Range to Andøya Space Center (ASC) on 6 June 2014 to reflect an increased focus on also other activities than sounding rockets, though rocketry is still its main focus. The company was now 90% owned by the Ministry of Trade, Industry and Fisheries with Kongsberg retaining their 10%. That year they had a staff of 95 and had an annual revenue of 150 million krone.

Starting in 2013, one of Kongsberg's subsidiaries, Nammo and the ASC would form a partnership partially funded by the Future Launchers Preparatory Programme to create a new suite of standardized sounding rockets, capped off by a nanosat orbital rocket as part of project "North Star" that would all launch at ASC.

Beginning in 2018 there was broader discussion of building an orbital launch site at Andøya as part of the GCI Mesosphere project targeting near-polar orbits by 2023, however, such sites could not be built at the at-capacity Oksebåsen.

== Andøya Spaceport ==
Andøya Spaceport was established as a project in 2018, with the aim of establishing the first European launch base for small satellites. It is mainly satellites for Earth observation and communications that are planned to be launched from Andøya, in polar- or Sun-synchronous orbit. In polar orbit, the satellite passes above or near the Earth's poles at each orbit. This is favorable for Norway as they then provide good satellite coverage of Norwegian areas and good communication and sea monitoring in the north. Sun-synchronous orbit means that the satellite passes a given latitude to two fixed local times, one for northbound and one for southbound passage. The satellite's orbital plane rotates eastwards approx. 1 degree per day, and so it maintains the angle with respect to the sunlight and gets most light for its solar cells. In this way, satellites for Earth observation receive data with an equal amount of sunlight and can thus use data to analyze changes that occur on the surface throughout the year.

The first formal request for an orbital pad came from the Ministry of Trade and Industry in February 2019 and on 11 June, 2021 the Norwegian Parliament passed a 365.6 million kroner package to finance the construction of two orbital launch pads at Andøya with one intended for Isar Aerospace, and the other for Rocket Factory Augsburg. Enoksen would step down as CEO with Ketil Olsen, the former COO, being named to replace him on an interim basis on 14 October 2021. On 25 February, 2022, Olsen was named the full time CEO.

=== Nammo and North Star (2013-2018) ===
In January 2013, Nammo and the Andøya Space Center announced that they would be "developing a rocket system called North Star that will use a standardized hybrid motor, clustered in different numbers and arrangements, to build two types of sounding rockets and an orbital launcher" that would be able to deliver a 10 kg (22 lb) nanosat into polar orbit. Each of these rockets would've been powered by 30kN "Unitary Motors" (UM1) partially funded by the ESA's "Future Launchers Preparatory Programme" (FLPP) with Nammo performing their first static fire in 2014. These rocket designs would notability be constrained to be able to launch on existing sounding rocket hardware at Oksebåsen, preventing the need for a new orbital pad.

By 2015 Nammo had announced that their largest rocket could place a 20-25kg satellite in a 250-350km polar orbit. Later that year, an explosion would occur during a motor test fire that resulted in the total destruction of Nammo's rocket R&D facilities. The ESA would announce a successful demonstration of the Motor in 2016. At the 7th European Conference for Aeronautics and Space Sciences in 2017 Nammo fully unveiled the North Star that would come in 5 variants: Nucleus was a single stage sounding rocket, Nucleus Aurora was a two-stage sounding rocket, Borealis was a larger sounding rocket, while Aurora Borealis was a two stage variant of the Borealis. Lastly, the Corona Aurora Borealis was a three stage orbital launcher. In July 2018 Nammo announced that it had completed its final static fire for its Nucleus. It was at this time it became apparent that the existing infrastructure at Oksebåsen could not support an orbital launch and a new pad would have to be made.

In the lead up to the first launch of Nucleus Nammo announced that Corona Aurora Borealis was now expected to send 50-150kg to orbit, and that they were in development of a more powerful 75-100kN hybrid engine (UM2). On 27 September, 2018, Nucleus would launch for the first and only time at pad U3, reaching an apogee of 107.4km with 6 payloads just crossing the 100km Kármán line. Following the success of the Nucleus launch Nammo focued most of their effort in their orbital rocket, pending funding from the ESA to develop the UM2. However, beyond the initial funding from FLPP no additional ESA funding ever came. The entire North Star team at Nammo consisted of 10-20 individuals, and without support from either the ESA nor Andøya did not have the resources necessary to continue development of their orbital rocket, but did complete the UM2.

==== ENVOL (2020) ====
In February 2020 Nammo shifted away from their North Star and instead launched a nine-company consortium to develop the European Newspace Vertical Orbital Launcher (ENVOL) a three-stage hyrbrid orbital launcher designed to place 200kg into low earth orbit. Andøya Space would be a member of this consortium. This would essentially be a Corona Aurora Borealis redesigned with UM2 engines instead of UM1 engines but with substantial outside funding. This included €3,987,416 from the EU's Horizon 2020 fund.

In 2021 Nammo announced that they intended to launch a Nucleus XL sounding rocket, which would've largely been the already proven Nucleus design but with a UM2 engine which would have been made available to commercial launches some time in 2027. In April 2023 the EU concluded the ENVOL program after four technology demonstrations including a water-tested turbopump and a full-size second-stage tank, ending their financial obligation to the project. As of 2026 Nammo is still aiming for their 2027 availability date for Nucleus XL.

=== Isar Aerospace and Spectrum (2021) ===
On 14 April, 2021, Isar Aerospace of Germany signed an agreement with Andøya Space, securing exclusive access for a period of up to twenty years to one launch pad on the island Andøya. As a launch site operator, the Andøya Spaceport provides launch pads, payload integration facilities as well as the technical infrastructure on site. Funding for the Spectrum launch pad was provided by the Norwegian government on 11 June, 2021. Construction would begin in March 2022 with a launch-control center built at Nordmela.

The pad would be officially opened on 2 November, 2023, with Ingun Berget, President of Andøya Spaceport, said: “The opening of the spaceport on Andøya island marks an important milestone for Norway, European New Space industry and our partnership with Isar Aerospace: this enables us to have the first satellite launches ever from European soil to take place from Andøya. The attendance of today's opening by Crown Prince Haakon underlines the importance of our endeavor and puts us on the New Space map in Europe.” The CEO and co-founder of Isar Aerospace said that the company and Andøya Spaceport had created an orbital launch site intended to provide Norway and Europe with access to space.

Following an initial launch failure in March 2025, Isar Aerospace successfully launched its Spectrum rocket on its second flight attempt on 5 September 2026, on the mission "Onward and Upward". The rocket successfully reached orbit with several customer payloads.

=== Second orbital pad (2026) ===
In 2020 Andøya signed an agreement with Rocket Factory Augsburg (RFA) to build an orbital pad to launch their RFA One which would be financed by the Norwegian government on 11 June, 2021. The release of this funding was to be conditionally released by the Norwegian government after the construction of the first pad and on April 28, 2021, RFA signed a contract to lease the new pad for a 14-year period. However, seeking to beat Isar in being the first private European rocket launch, RFA superseded their contract with an agreement to launch out of SaxaVord on 11 January, 2023 and as such the 102.6 million kroner for the second pad was never released.

On 30 September, 2026, the Norwegian Minister of Trade and Industry Cecilie Myrseth announced that the Norwegian government would be financing the construction and security for the second orbital launch pad without a contracted partner. 323.3 million Norwegian kroner was allocated towards the pad from the 2028 state budget originally allocated for the Ministry of Defense and Ministry of Trade and Industry.

In 2024-2025 the Norwegian government proposed giving an American company exclusive access to a second orbital pad for weapons-free launches on rockets not made from surplus ballistic missile parts essentially ruling out Minotaur launches. On 15 April, 2026, a "US–Norway Space Operations Coordination Meeting" was held in Washington D.C. between Andøya, Rocket Lab, the US Space Force, the Space Systems Command, the Norwegian Ministry of Defence and various high ranking U.S. and Norwegian government officials to coordinate U.S. Space Force and Norwegian Ministry of Defence launches out of Andøya via Rocket Lab's Electron.

== Pads ==

Andøya has six launch pads during all or part of its life as a launch site:

- LC5 69.2944°N 16.0198°E
- LC9 69.2941°N 16.0188°E
- LC10 69.2940°N 16.0185°E
- Athena 69.2943°N 16.0207°E
- Haugnes 69.2800°N 16.1800°E
- U3 69.2943°N 16.0207°E
- Orbital Launch Pad A 69.1087°N 15.5887°E

== Accidents and incidents ==
On 30 March 2025, the inaugural launch of Isar Aerospace's first space launcher, the Spectrum rocket, experienced an anomaly and was terminated 30 seconds into flight before falling back to the earth and exploding on the mission "Going Full Spectrum".

On 25 March 2026, the countdown of a Spectrum rocket had to be aborted 3 seconds before liftoff due to a Longline fishing boat being within the safety zone. The skipper denied intent to sabotage and claimed delays with reeling in his line, but confirmed a dispute about use of the area as his boat "Einar" already on 23 October 2025 had caused the abort of a German Air Force bombing exercise when it rejected to clear the Andøya Space Defence target area. While the bombers had no civil Aviation call sign, the U-turn of the accompanying NATO Airbus A330 MRTT tanker was registered by aviation web sites.
