= LEO Cargo Return Service =

Space cargo vehicle development programme of the European Space Agency

- Type of project: Human spaceflight
- Owner: European Space Agency
- Established: 2023; 3 years ago
- Status: Active

The LEO Cargo Return Service (LCRS) is an initiative of the European Space Agency (ESA) supporting the development of European commercial uncrewed cargo spacecraft for delivery service to and from space stations in low-Earth orbit (LEO). LCRS is patterned on NASA's COTS programme which led to the development of the Dragon and Cygnus cargo spacecraft. The first phase of LCRS, awarded in 2024, is supporting the development of space capsules by Thales Alenia Space and The Exploration Company. First orbital flight of at least one of the new vehicles is expected in 2028 or 2029. LCRS plans include two demonstration missions docking to the ISS.

== History ==
LCRS was first announced as the "Commercial Cargo Transportation Initiative" on 11 May 2023. In May 2024, ESA awarded Phase 1 contracts to The Exploration Company and Thales Alenia Space. In November 2025, ESA's ministerial council agreed to fully funding Phase 2 of the initiative with the expectation of two providers to conduct demonstration flights to the ISS by 2029. ESA also committed to serving as an anchor customer for the resulting services. In December 2025, ESA and NASA agreed on the possibility of using ESA's LCRS cargo flights to the ISS as part of the Common System Operations Costs (CSOC) barter framework.

In January 2026, ESA renamed Phase 2 of LCRS to the Autonomous LEO Accelerated Demo Docking to ISS Node (ALADDIN) and adjusted its scope to potentially include demonstration flights to future commercial LEO destinations by the end of 2030. On 10 March 2026, ESA announced the intention to incentivise the use of Ariane 6 or other European launchers for ALADDIN with up to €50 million (in addition to up to €420 million per contract).

On 10 September 2026, during the International Space Summit in Paris, ESA awarded a €760 million ALADDIN contract to The Exploration Company for up to three space station cargo flights of Nyx. On the same day, it became publicly known that the company signed a contract with Arianespace to launch the first Nyx flight on Ariane 6. That flight was expected no later than 2029.

== See also ==
- Comparison of space station cargo vehicles
- List of ESA programmes and missions
- European Launcher Challenge
- Commercial spaceflight
