= ElevationSpace =

- Type: Private
- Industry: aerospace
- Founded: February 2021 in Aoba-ku, Sendai, Miyagi, Japan
- Founder: Ryohei Kobayashi
- Fate: Active
- Headquarters: Aoba-ku, Sendai, Miyagi, Japan
- Products: space capsules
- Website: elevation-space.com

ElevationSpace is a private Japanese company developing satellites that can conduct various experiments in orbit, and then bring its payload back to Earth inside a space capsule. ElevationSpace is a spin-off company of Tohoku University, and is headquartered in Sendai, Miyagi.

The company's first satellite is named Aoba after Mount Aoba in Sendai. On 3 March 2025, ElevationSpace announced that they had signed an agreement with Isar Aerospace to launch Aoba on a Spectrum rocket.

== History ==
ElevationSpace was founded by Ryohei Kobayashi in 2021. In 2023, ElevationSpace and Tohoku University tested a hybrid-propellant thruster that will be used on the Aoba satellite.

On 29 July 2025, the company revealed plans to develop a crewed spacecraft by the 2040s.

== ELS-R ==
ELS-R is a free flying satellite carrying a space capsule, being developed by ElevationSpace. The first ELS-R is nicknamed Aoba, and will be launched on Isar Aerospace's Spectrum rocket from Andøya in Norway. Several experiments are planned to be carried on board Aoba, including a growth experiment of Euglena.

== See also ==
- Firefly Aerospace
- PLD Space
- Space Forge
- The Exploration Company
- Varda Space Industries
