= Reusable spacecraft =

Spacecraft designed for repeated use and reusability

Reusable spacecraft are spacecraft capable of repeated launch, atmospheric reentry, and landing or splashdown. This contrasts with expendable spacecraft which are designed to be discarded after use. Agencies operating reusable spacecraft aim to have lower costs and higher flight frequencies.

Reusable spacecraft may be crewed or uncrewed and orbital or sub-orbital. Examples include spaceplanes such as the Space Shuttle and the Boeing X-37B, and space capsules such as the SpaceX Dragon. The Blue Origin New Shepard is an example of a sub-orbital spacecraft.

== History ==
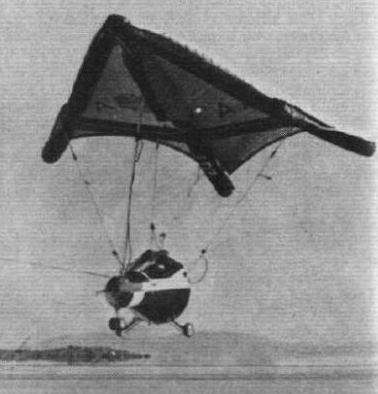
Gemini paraglider during tests at Edwards Air Force Base in August 1964; glider landings were canceled in favor of parachute splashdowns.

On 17 July 1962, the North American X-15 rocket plane reached an altitude of 95.9 km on a sub-orbital flight. In 1963, the X-15 completed two flights above 100 km. These marked the first spaceflights with a reusable vehicle. (Note: The United States defines spaceflight as above 80km, while 100km is internationally recognized by the FAI) The Gemini SC-2 capsule followed, completing sub-orbital flights in 1965 and 1966.

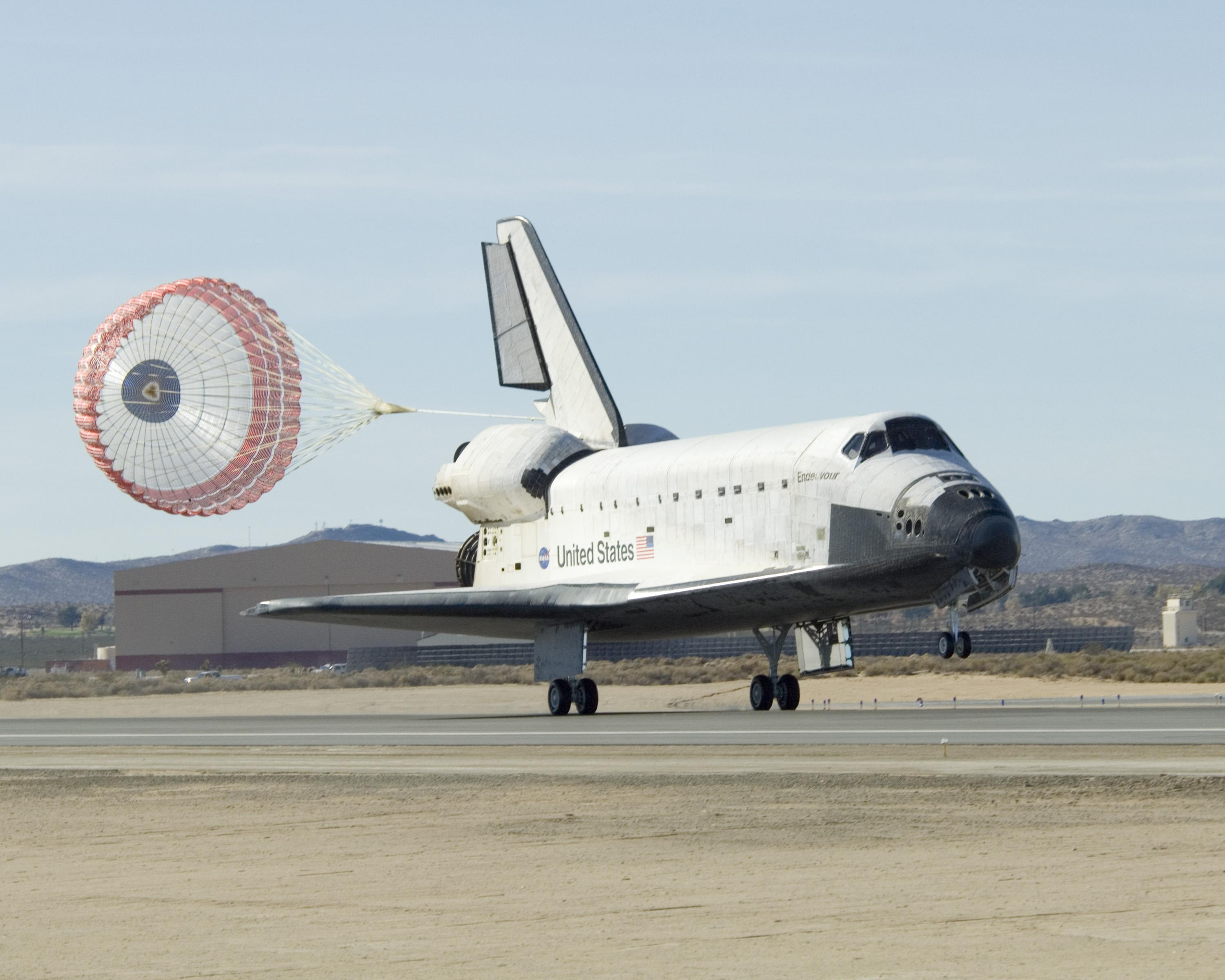
Space Shuttle Endeavour landing from orbit on STS-126, its 22nd spaceflight

The first spacecraft to be reused in orbit was the Soviet VA spacecraft, a capsule that was part of the larger TKS spacecraft. A VA capsule that launched in 1977 was reflown in 1978.

The Space Shuttle was the first orbital spacecraft designed for reuse according to NASA, and first launched in 1981. Five orbiters would launch 135 times before the vehicle's retirement in 2011. Space Shuttle Discovery set the record of 39 spaceflights with a single spacecraft in 2011. The Space Shuttle program, however, faced criticism that it failed to reduce the cost of access to space and had safety concerns following the Challenger and Columbia disasters.

The SpaceX Dragon 1 first flew in 2010 and became the first commercially built and operated spacecraft to be recovered from orbit. In 2012, Dragon became the first commercial vehicle to attach to the International Space Station (ISS), after which it conducted regular cargo resupply flights for NASA. Its first reuse was in 2017, and the vehicle led to the development of the Dragon 2, which first reached orbit in 2019. Dragon 2 carries both cargo and crew, and has been described as the most cost-effective spacecraft ever used by NASA. In 2021, Dragon 2 conducted the first orbital flight with only private astronauts on board.

SpaceShipOne, another rocket plane, completed the first private sub-orbital spaceflight in 2004 and led to the development of SpaceShipTwo. The Blue Origin New Shepard capsule conducts commercial sub-orbital spaceflights, as did SpaceShipTwo. (Note: SpaceShipTwo has exceeded altitudes of 80km, but not 100km)

Development flights for SpaceX Starship test vehicles began in 2019. Starship is intended to be both a fully reusable spacecraft and launch vehicle. (Note: Both the spacecraft and entire launch vehicle are named Starship) Starship's first integrated launch with its booster was in 2023, and it reached space the same year. In 2024, Starship successfully reentered the atmosphere and completed propulsive splashdowns in the Indian Ocean. In 2026, SpaceX recovered a Starship after it splashed down in the Indian Ocean.

== Design ==
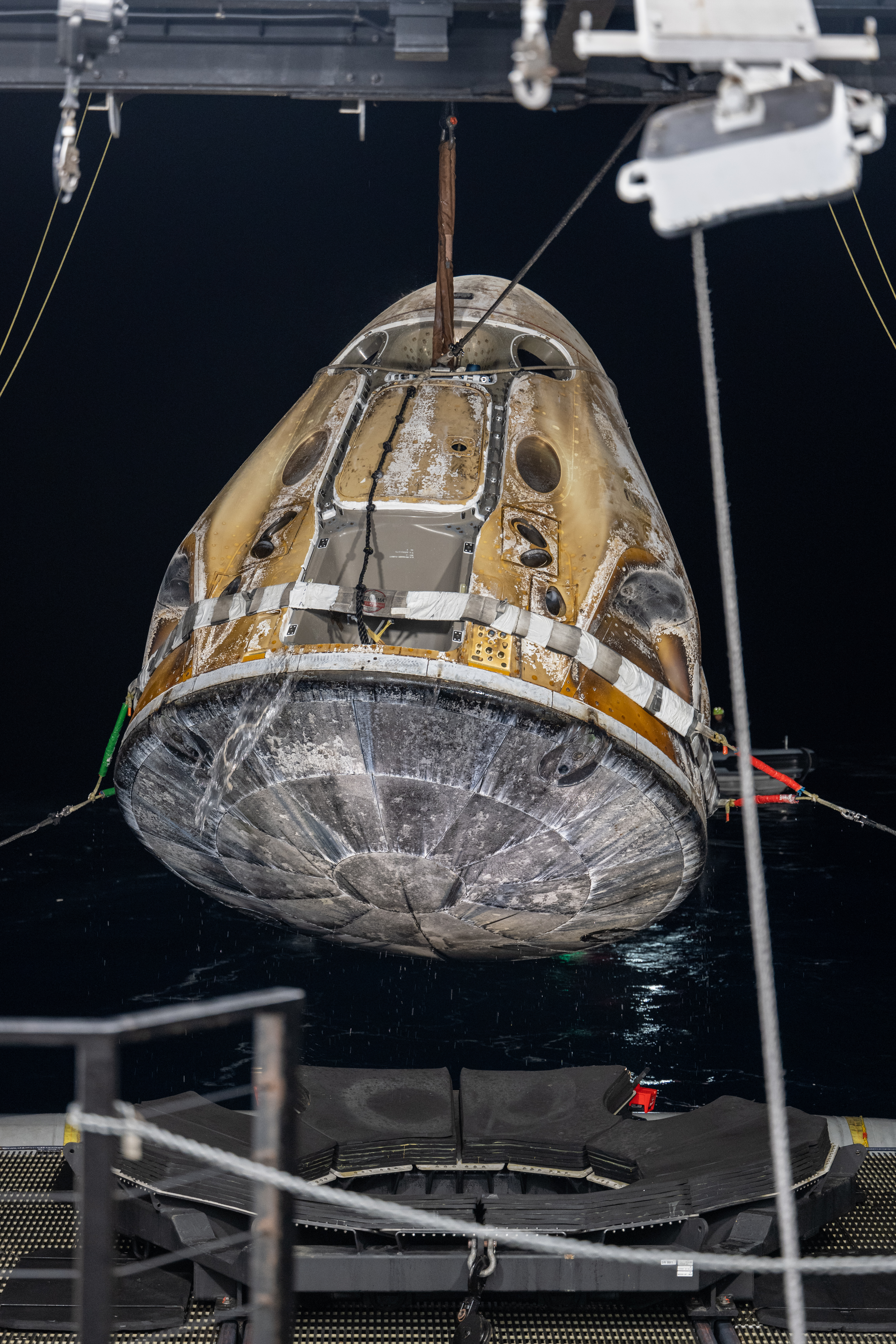
Crew Dragon Endurance being recovered after its second flight

Reusable spacecraft must survive reentry and safely return to the surface. The mass of any hardware dedicated for this reduces potential payload mass.

=== Atmospheric entry ===
Orbital spacecraft initiate a deorbit burn and orient themselves for atmospheric entry. The Boeing Starliner and Orion discard their service modules, including most of their maneuvering engines. The SpaceX Dragon discards its trunk, which includes its solar panels and radiators, but retains its Draco engines in the capsule. The Space Shuttle was notable for recovering the entire spacecraft.

In general, around 15% of the landed weight of a vehicle is heat shielding. Thermal protection systems (TPS) can be made of a variety of materials, including reinforced carbon-carbon and ablative materials. Historically, these materials were first developed on ballistic missile reentry vehicles. However, the requirements of reusable space systems differ from those of single use reentry vehicles, especially with regards to heat shield requirements. In particular the need for durable high emissivity coatings that can withstand multiple thermal cycles constitutes a key requirement in the development of new reusable spacecraft. Current materials for such high emissivity coatings include transition metal disilicides.

Ablative heat shields are reliable, but are heavy and diminished with use. Reinforced carbon-carbon heat tiles such as those used on the Space Shuttle are fragile, which contributed to the Columbia disaster. The Space Shuttle used the LI-900 material.

Three European reusable spacecraft under development in the 2020s illustrate three different designs: a conical space capsule (Nyx), a lifting body (Space Rider), and a winged spaceplane (Vortex), each connected to an expendable service module

=== Landing and refurbishment ===
Runway landings from orbit became prevalent with the introduction of the Space Shuttle. Spaceplanes that land horizontally on a runway require lifting surfaces and landing gear. Designs include the Space Shuttle's delta wing and the Dream Chaser's lifting body. Spaceplanes require access to a long enough runway, a necessary consideration for the Space Shuttle launch abort modes.

The first recoverable space capsules landed under parachute, either on land or by splashing down in a body of water. Ground landings require additional cushioning, which Starliner accomplishes with deployable airbags. This was considered for Orion as well, but was ruled out due to the extra mass required. The sub-orbital New Shepard uses retro-rockets to slow down just before touchdown, a technique that has been used by the expendable Soyuz since the 1960s. Splashing down allows the water to cushion the spacecraft, but exposure to salt water can have adverse effects on the vehicle. Despite this, SpaceX began regularly reusing Dragon capsules after splashdown.

Dragon 2 was originally designed to propusively land using its SuperDraco engines; however, propulsive landings for Dragon were canceled (Note: Crew Dragon retains the ability to propulsively land in the event of parachute failure.) and Dragon 2 also uses parachutes to splashdown in the ocean. Starship is designed to propulsively land using its Raptor engines. It aims to be "caught" by the launch tower, as is done for the Super Heavy booster. This eliminates the need for traditional landing legs on the vehicle and aims to lower the turnaround time between launches.

After a spacecraft is recovered, it may need to be refurbished before its next flight. Depending on the spacecraft design, this process may be lengthy and expensive, and there may be a limit to how many times a spacecraft can be refurbished before it has to be retired.

== List of reusable spacecraft ==
=== Operational ===
Vehicle	Origin	Manufacturer	Orbital or sub-orbital	Crew capacity	Reuse	Recovery method	First spaceflight
Dragon 2	United States	SpaceX	Orbital	4-7 (crew); 0 (cargo)	Partial	Parachute splashdown	2019 (crew); 2020 (cargo)
New Shepard	United States	Blue Origin	Sub-orbital	6	Full	Parachute landing	2015
X-37B	United States	Boeing	Orbital	—N/a	Full (Note: The X-37 can carry an optional expendable service module)	Runway	2010
Starliner	United States	Boeing	Orbital	4	Partial	Parachute landing	2019
Orion	United States	Lockheed Martin (Crew Module) and Airbus Defense and Space (European Service Module)	Orbital	4	Partial	Parachute splashdown	2014
Shenlong	China		Orbital	—N/a		Runway	2020

=== Under development ===
Vehicle	Origin	Manufacturer	Orbital or sub-orbital	Crew capacity	Reuse	Recovery method	Expected spaceflight
Mengzhou	China	CAST	Orbital	3–7	Partial	Parachute landing	2020 (Note: A Mengzhou prototype completed an uncrewed test flight in 2020)
Starship	United States	SpaceX	Orbital	100	Full	Propulsive landing	2023 (Note: Starship prototypes have flown to space since 2023)
Dream Chaser	United States	Sierra Space	Orbital	0	Partial	Runway	2026
Delphi	United States	Lux Aeterna	Orbital	0	Full	Parachute landing	2027
Space Rider	Europe	Avio and Thales Alenia Space	Orbital	0	Partial	Parafoil landing	2028
Nyx	Europe	The Exploration Company	Orbital	0	Partial	Parachute landing	2028
Orel	Russia	RKK Energia	Orbital	4–6	Partial	TBA	2028
Vortex-S	Europe	Dassault Aviation and OHB	Orbital	0	Partial	Runway	TBA (Note: Subscale prototype Vortex-D is expected to perform a suborbital test flight in 2028.)
Haolong	China	CADI	Orbital	0	Full	Runway	TBA
RLV-TD	India			0		Runway	TBA

=== Retired ===
Vehicle	Origin	Manufacturer	Orbital or sub-orbital	Crew capacity	Reuse	Recovery method	First Spaceflight	Retired
X-15	United States	North American Aviation	Sub-orbital	1	Full	Runway	1962 (Note: The X-15 reached an altitude of 95.9km on July 17, 1962. It reached an altitude of 106.1km on July 19, 1963)	1968
Gemini	United States	McDonnell Aircraft	Orbital (Note: Gemini SC-2 flew on two sub-orbital spaceflights, while the class of spacecraft was proven as orbital.)	2	Partial	Parachute splashdown	1964	1966
VA spacecraft	Soviet Union	NPO Mashinostroyeniya	Orbital	—N/a (Note: The VA spacecraft was designed to carry crew, but this was never proven)	Partial	Parachute	1976	1985
Space Shuttle	United States	Rockwell International	Orbital	8	Full	Runway	1981	2011
Buran (Note: Buran was designed to be reused and was recovered, but only completed one spaceflight.)	Soviet Union		Orbital	10 (Note: Buran was designed to carry cosmonauts, but this was not proven)	Full	Runway	1988	1988
SpaceShipOne	United States	Scaled Composites	Sub-orbital	1	Full	Runway	2004	2004
Dragon 1	United States	SpaceX	Orbital	—N/a	Partial	Parachute splashdown	2010	2020
SpaceShipTwo	United States	Scaled Composites & The Spaceship Company	Sub-orbital	6	Full	Runway	2018	2024

=== Proposed ===
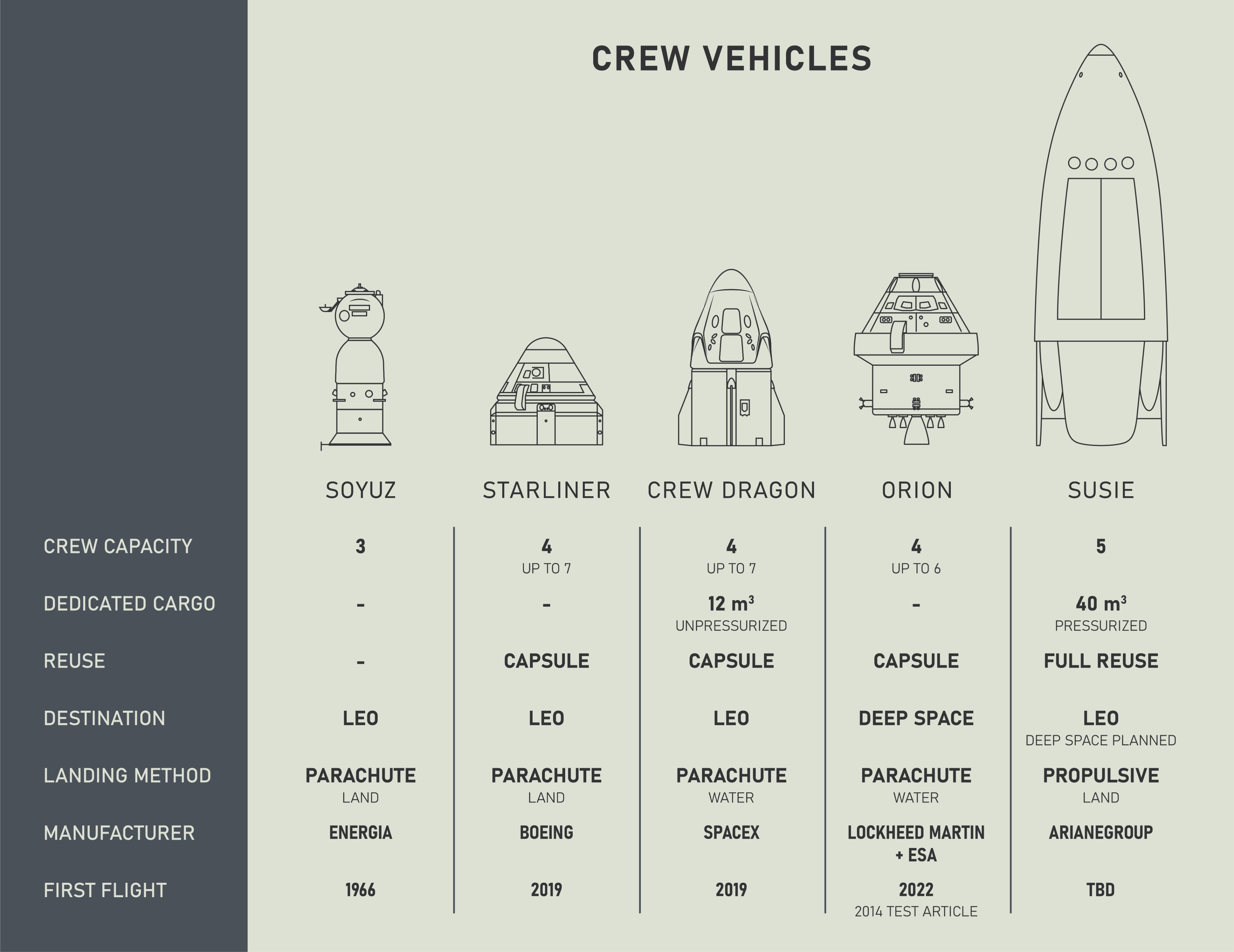
Comparison of Soyuz, Starliner, Crew Dragon, Orion, and Susie.

- SUSIE
- Avatar

=== Canceled ===
- Boeing X-20 Dyna-Soar
- Hermes
- Kliper
- MAKS
- HOPE-X
- Skylon

== See also ==
- Reusable launch system
