= International Space Summit =

2026 summit in Paris

- Date: September 9–10, 2026
- Venue: Grand Palais, Paris, France
- Organized by: Government of France

The International Space Summit was a summit held 9 to 10 September 2026, at the Grand Palais in Paris, focused on shared challenges facing the space sector. The summit was convened by French president Emmanuel Macron, and hosted delegations from 120 countries and a speech by European Commission President Ursula von der Leyen.

== White House pressure on US space companies ==
The European Union (EU) and its constituents countries has increased investment in the space sector. On 25 June 2025, the European Commission proposed the EU Space Act, an initiative to harmonize legal frameworks for space activities across EU member states. The Act is opposed by the United States government, which believes it will target American companies by imposing EU rules on them. A joint French-German initiative to allocate more satellite radio frequencies to European companies, including the EU's IRIS² satellite network, has been viewed as detrimental to Starlink.

On 27 August 2026, the White House's Office of Science and Technology Policy hosted a call with several American space companies planning to attend the summit, and said their attendance could signal support for European space policies opposed by the United States. Subsequently on 3 September 2026, American space companies Stoke Space, Starcloud, Blue Origin, and SpaceX cancelled their planned appearances at the summit, according to a spokesperson for the French Ministry of Higher Education and Research. The spokesperson said, "It's hard not to link it to the rumours of pressure," adding, "We obviously want to continue working with our US partners and allies, even though strategic about-turns and political pressures sometimes make the task needlessly complex."

== Results ==
Various contracts and agreements worth billions of Euros (€) combined were signed or announced at the event.

=== Crew and cargo ===
- Three European reusable spacecraft under development in the 2020s: Nyx, Space Rider, and Vortex-S
  ESA awarded a €760 million LEO Cargo Return Service phase 2 contract to The Exploration Company for up to three space station cargo flights of the Nyx spacecraft. The company also signed a contract with Arianespace to launch the first Nyx flight on Ariane 6. That flight was expected no later than 2029.
- ESA signed an agreement with Vast to fly the first Greek astronaut, Adrianos Golemis, to space on the company's PAM-6 flight to ISS, together with previously announced French and Czech ESA astronauts.
- ESA signed agreements with Axiom Space and Starlab, reiterating the agency's interest in using the companies' planned commercial space stations.
- French president Emmanuel Macron announced around €20 billion in investments for European space industry. He confirmed the French government's support for the development of Dassault's multipurpose spaceplane VORTEX, extending it from the sub-scale demonstrator VORTEX-D also to the operational orbital version VORTEX-S. He also called for developing European crewed spaceflight capability within a decade.
- Venturi Space unveiled the Alta Luna single-person lunar rover for local operations around future lunar bases.
- ESA member states signed a document expressing their interest in continuing human spaceflight to low Earth orbit after the expected decommissioning of ISS and calling on ESA to study options for strengthening European autonomy in this area, to be discussed at the upcoming Intermediate Ministerial Meeting in December 2026.

=== Satellites and launches ===
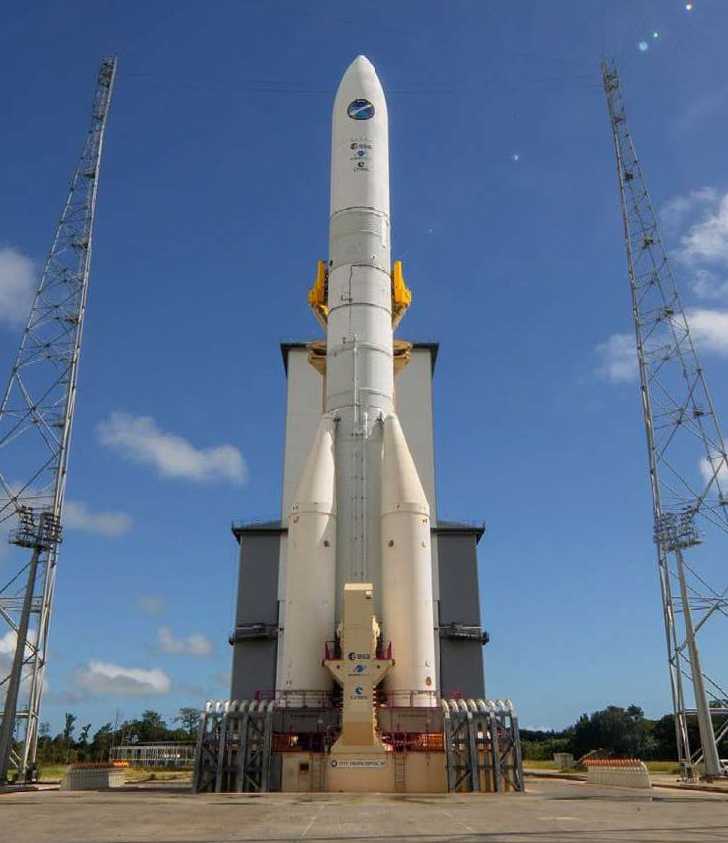
Ariane 6

- Thales Alenia Space, Aerospacelab, and Airbus Defence and Space were awarded contracts, expected to total more than €5.4 billion, to build 330 LEO satellites for the EU's secure communications satellite constellation IRIS².
- Eutelsat agreed to buy another 229 low-Earth orbit satellites from Airbus Defence and Space to expand its OneWeb constellation for satellite internet services. Eutelsat also booked two Ariane 64 flights in 2027 and 2028 to launch OneWeb satellites.
- Amazon LEO booked another six Ariane 64 flights to launch its internet satellites.
- AscendArc selected Arianespace to launch the Korean communications satellite Koreasat 9 on an Ariane 6 rideshare mission to GTO in 2028.
- Firefly Aerospace announced an agreement with SSC Space to launch its Firefly Alpha orbital rockets from Esrange Space Center in Sweden.
- MaiaSpace signed an agreement with the Japanese company iQPS for multiple launches of their synthetic aperture radar satellites on the reusable Maia rocket starting in 2029.
- According to Avio CEO Giulio Ranzo, multiple launch customers, recently turned away by SpaceX, used the event to lobby European institutions for financial support for launching their payloads on European rockets.

== See also ==
- European Space Agency – European organisation dedicated to space exploration
  - Terrae Novae – European programme for human spaceflight and robotic space exploration
  - European Launcher Challenge – Space launch vehicle development programme of the European Space Agency
  - LEO Cargo Return Service – Space cargo vehicle development programme of the European Space Agency
- European Union Agency for the Space Programme – Agency of the European Union
- Space policy of the second Trump administration
