= Nyx (spacecraft) =

European reusable space capsule

- Manufacturer: The Exploration Company
- Country of origin: European Space Agency
- Operator: The Exploration Company
- Applications: Space logistics, cargo spacecraft
- Website: www.exploration.space/nyx

Specifications
- Spacecraft type: Reusable space capsule

Production
- Status: In development
- Maiden launch: 2028 (planned)

Related spacecraft
- Launch vehicle: Ariane 6

Nyx is a reusable spacecraft under development by the European company The Exploration Company (TEC) with the support of the European Space Agency (ESA) for cargo (and potentially crewed) missions to low Earth orbit and beyond. It is designed to provide independent European access to space logistics services, including resupply of space stations. The first launch of Nyx is expected in 2028.

== Overview ==
Nyx is a modular space capsule concept intended to transport cargo to and from orbital destinations such as the International Space Station and future commercial space stations. The spacecraft is designed with reusability in mind, aiming to reduce mission costs and increase launch flexibility. The spacecraft is expected to be compatible with multiple launch vehicles and is part of broader European efforts to strengthen autonomy in space transportation systems. Nyx features a pressurised capsule and a service module. The capsule is capable of carrying several tonnes of cargo and includes avionics, propulsion, thermal protection systems, and parachutes designed for atmospheric re-entry and recovery. The service module provides further propulsion and maneuvering capabilities.

Nyx compared to other European reusable spacecraft: Space Rider and Vortex-S

Benjamin Haddad and Ursula von der Leyen with a crewed Nyx model at the International Space Summit in 2026

== History ==
The Nyx program is led by The Exploration Company, a European aerospace startup founded in 2021. The project has received support from the European Space Agency (ESA) through various funding and partnership initiatives. In 2023 and 2024, the company conducted early design and testing phases, with plans for demonstration missions later in the decade.

On 31 March 2025, TES announced that it had successfully completed a set of pressure tests on the Nyx structural test model. The first launch was planned for 2028 at that time. In August 2025, the Nyx spacecraft passed Phase 1 of the International Space Station Safety Review. In October 2025, TEC concluded an extensive wind-tunnel testing campaign, validating Nyx's behaviour across the entire flight regime from subsonic to hypersonic conditions, at the DLR's facilities in Cologne. In November 2025, TEC completed an initial test campaign of the Micrometeoroid and Orbital Debris (MMOD) shield of Nyx at the German Institute for High-Speed Dynamics. In December 2025, TEC awarded a contract to Redwire Belgium to build two IDSS-compliant International Berthing and Docking Mechanisms (IBDMs) for the Nyx spacecraft.

In January 2026, TEC conducted 20 splashdown tests with a 1:4 scale model of the Nyx capsule at the National Research Council's Institute of Marine Engineering in Rome. In February 2026, TEC received the pressurised module (from CNIM Systèmes Industriels) and the front shield (from PERSICO GROUP) for the structural test model of Nyx. In March 2026, TEC completed initial pressure testing of the Nyx structural test model pressurised structure. In April 2026, The dynamic vibration test campaign of the Nyx structural test model begun at ESTEC. The campaign ended in May 2026 after 69 individual tests with multiple payload configurations. In June 2026, TEC completed a drop test in the Mojave Desert in which they dropped dedicated Drop Test Vehicle and tested both the drogue parachutes and main parachutes. A helicopter hoisted the vehicle up to 2.8 km and released it over a designated landing site. The full descent sequence went as planned with successful deployment of both the drogue parachutes and the mains.

On 10 September 2026, during the International Space Summit in Paris, ESA awarded a €760 million ALADDIN (LEO Cargo Return Service phase 2) contract to The Exploration Company for up to three space station cargo flights of Nyx. On the same day, it was announced that the company signed a contract with Arianespace to launch the first Nyx flight on Ariane 6. That flight was expected no later than 2029.

== See also ==
- Space capsule
- Commercial spaceflight
- Cargo spacecraft
- Space station cargo vehicles
- LEO Cargo Return Service
- Terrae Novae
