= List of international prime ministerial trips made by Rumen Radev =

This is a list of international prime ministerial trips made by Rumen Radev, who has served as the Prime Minister of Bulgaria since 8 May 2026.

== Summary ==
Radev has visited 6 countries during his tenure as Prime Minister. The number of visits per country where Radev has traveled are:

- One visit to Germany, Ireland, Poland and Turkey
- Three visits to Belgium and France

== 2026 ==
Country	Location(s)	Dates	Details
Germany	Berlin	18 May	Radev's first foreign visit as Prime Minister. Met with Chancellor Friedrich Merz for talks on bilateral cooperation, European policy and international security, followed by a joint press conference.
France	Paris	27 May	Met with President Emmanuel Macron at the Élysée Palace, discussing bilateral cooperation, the European agenda, energy diversification and nuclear energy.
Belgium	Brussels	28 May	Held meetings with Belgian Prime Minister Bart De Wever, NATO Secretary General Mark Rutte, European Commission President Ursula von der Leyen and European Council President Antonio Costa.
Belgium	Brussels	18–19 June	Radev's first participation in a meeting of the European Council as Prime Minister. Met with Ukrainian President Volodymyr Zelenskyy and secured EU approval of a fourth Recovery and Resilience Plan payment.
Turkey	Ankara	6–8 July	Attended the NATO summit. Met with President Recep Tayyip Erdogan; the two countries' gas companies agreed to suspend their bilateral supply agreement for 15 months.
France	Paris	13–14 July	Declined an invitation to the Coalition of the Willing meeting hosted by President Macron; attended the Bastille Day parade instead.
France	Paris	9–10 September	Attended the International Space Summit and an official reception hosted by President Macron. He witnessed the signing of a memorandum between Bulgaria's EnduroSat and France's Arianespace.
Poland	Warsaw	24 September	Made an official visit to Poland, accompanied by Deputy Prime Minister Alexandar Poulev, Defence Minister Dimitar Stoyanov and Interior Minister Ivan Demerdzhiev. Met with Prime Minister Donald Tusk for talks on the war in Ukraine, defence industry cooperation, energy and economic ties, followed by a joint press conference. Radev said Bulgaria would rely on Poland's help to keep its MiG-29 fighters operational.
Belgium	Brussels	15–16 October	Attended the European Council meeting, where leaders discussed European competitiveness and energy prices, the 2028–2034 Multiannual Financial Framework, the war in Ukraine, migration, EU enlargement and the situation in the Middle East. On the sidelines, he took part in a meeting of the Friends of Cohesion group and a review of progress on the One Europe, One Market Roadmap.
Ireland	Dublin	12–13 November	Attended the 9th European Political Community Summit and an informal European Council meeting of leaders.

== Multilateral meetings ==
Rumen Radev participated in the following summits during his premiership:

Group	2026
European Council	18–19 June, 15–16 October, and informal 13 November in Dublin
European Political Community	12 November, Dublin
NATO	7–8 July, Ankara
Others	International Space Summit, 9–10 September, Paris

== See also ==
- Foreign relations of Bulgaria
