= Hélène Huby =

CEO of a rocket and space company

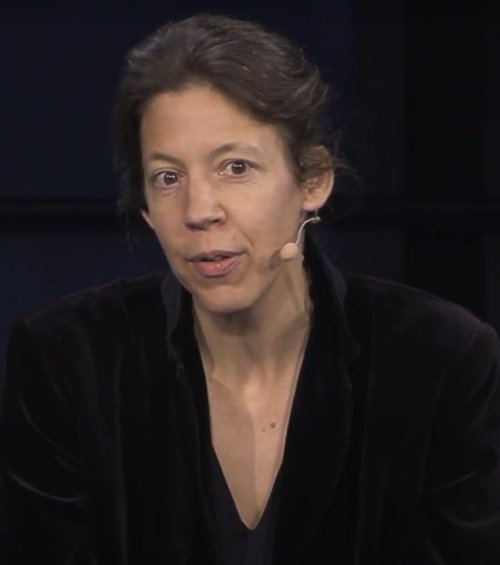
- Born: 1977 or 1978 (age 47–48)
- Education: Master's degree École normale supérieure École nationale d'administration
- Occupation: CEO
- Organization: The Exploration Company

Hélène Huby (French pronunciation: [elɛn ybi]; born 1977 or 1978) is a French entrepeneur. She is the co-founder and CEO of The Exploration Company, which aims to democratize space exploration.

Sailor Jean Le Bret was her great-grandfather.

== Education ==
Huby was educated at Lycée Henri IV. She obtained her master's degree in Economics and Mathematics from the École normale supérieure and her master's degree in Public Administration from the École nationale d'administration.

== Career ==
Huby is the chief executive officer of The Exploration Company. She started her career at a European SME undergoing turnaround where she focused mainly on the Internet. Then moved to the company FaberNovel (Paris, Hamburg) to manage several digital innovation projects. Later she became Director of Innovation at Airbus Defence & Space (Toulouse, Paris, Bremen, Munich, Madrid).

Huby served as an executive at Airbus Defence & Space and ArianeGroup both in operational and strategic roles. She has been in medical research. At Airbus, she was vice president for the Orion spacecraft's service module. Hélène Huby has co-founded and is a Member of the Board of the Microbiome Foundation. She is the Founder & Chair of Urania Ventures, a deep tech investment company. She is the Founder & Chair of The Karman Project., a non-profit foundation which fosters trust, independent dialogue and cooperation between the ones who shape the future of space.

In 2023 she was awarded the Ordre national du Mérite, Knight class.

== Personal life ==
Huby is married with four children.
