= Comparison of space station cargo vehicles =

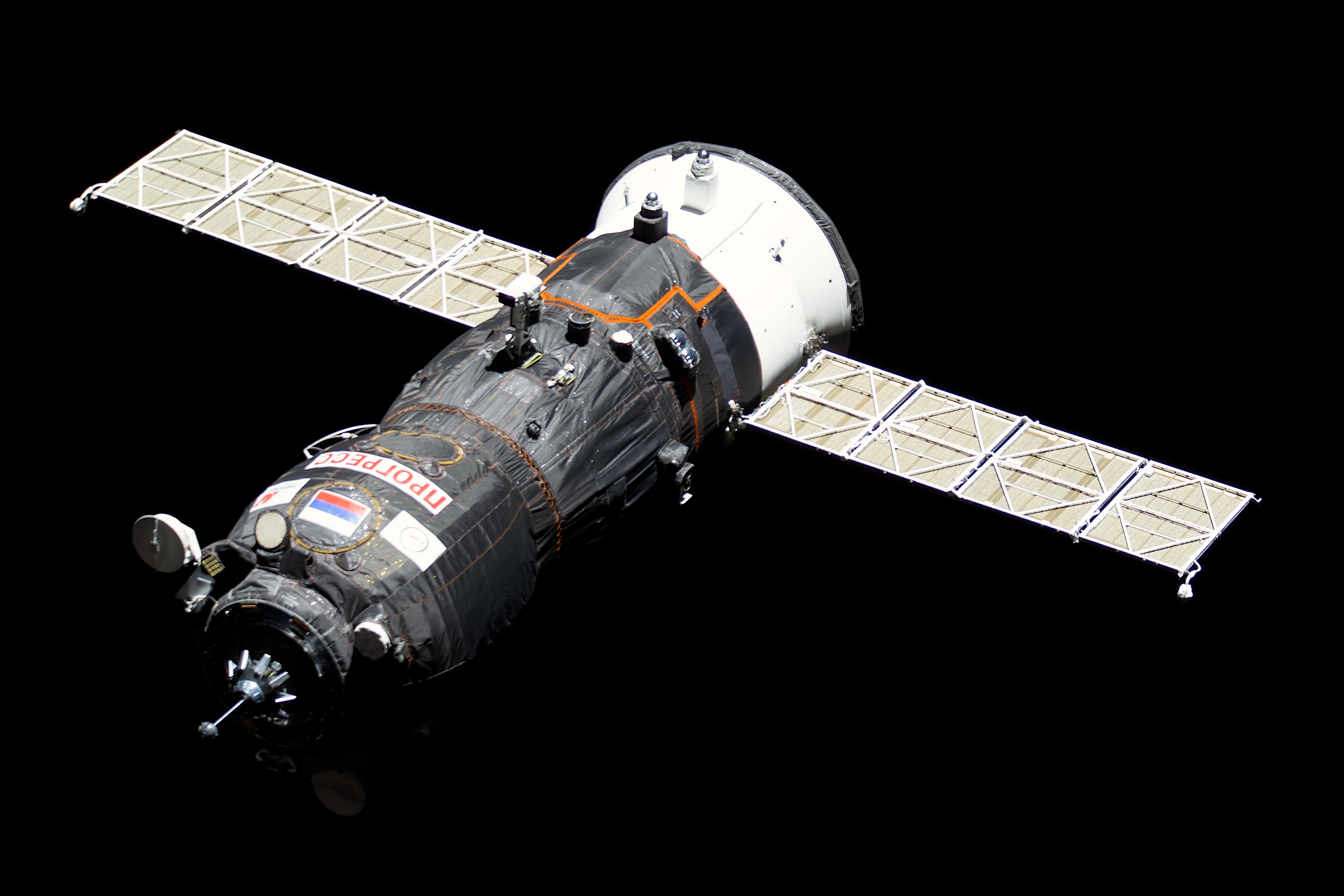
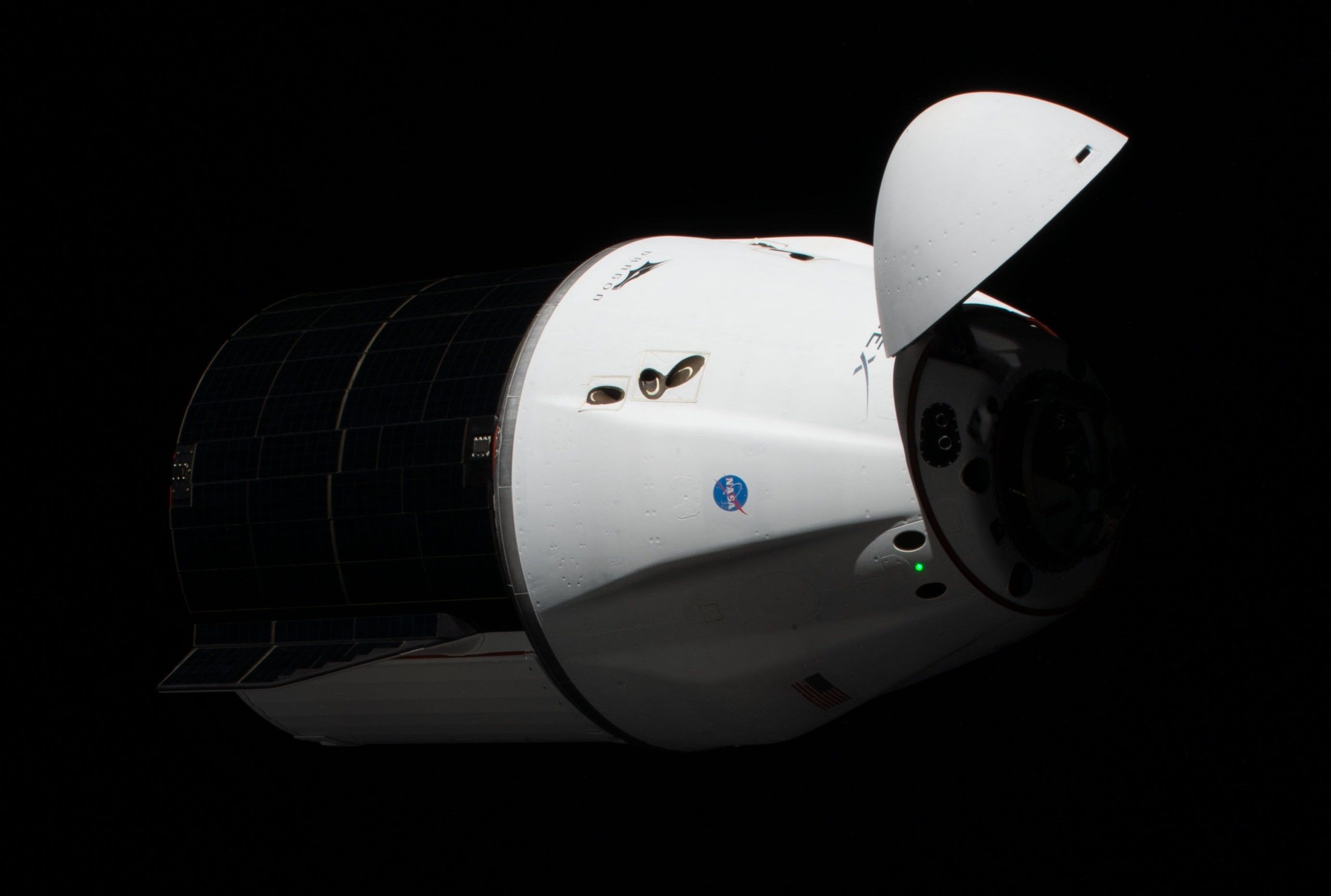
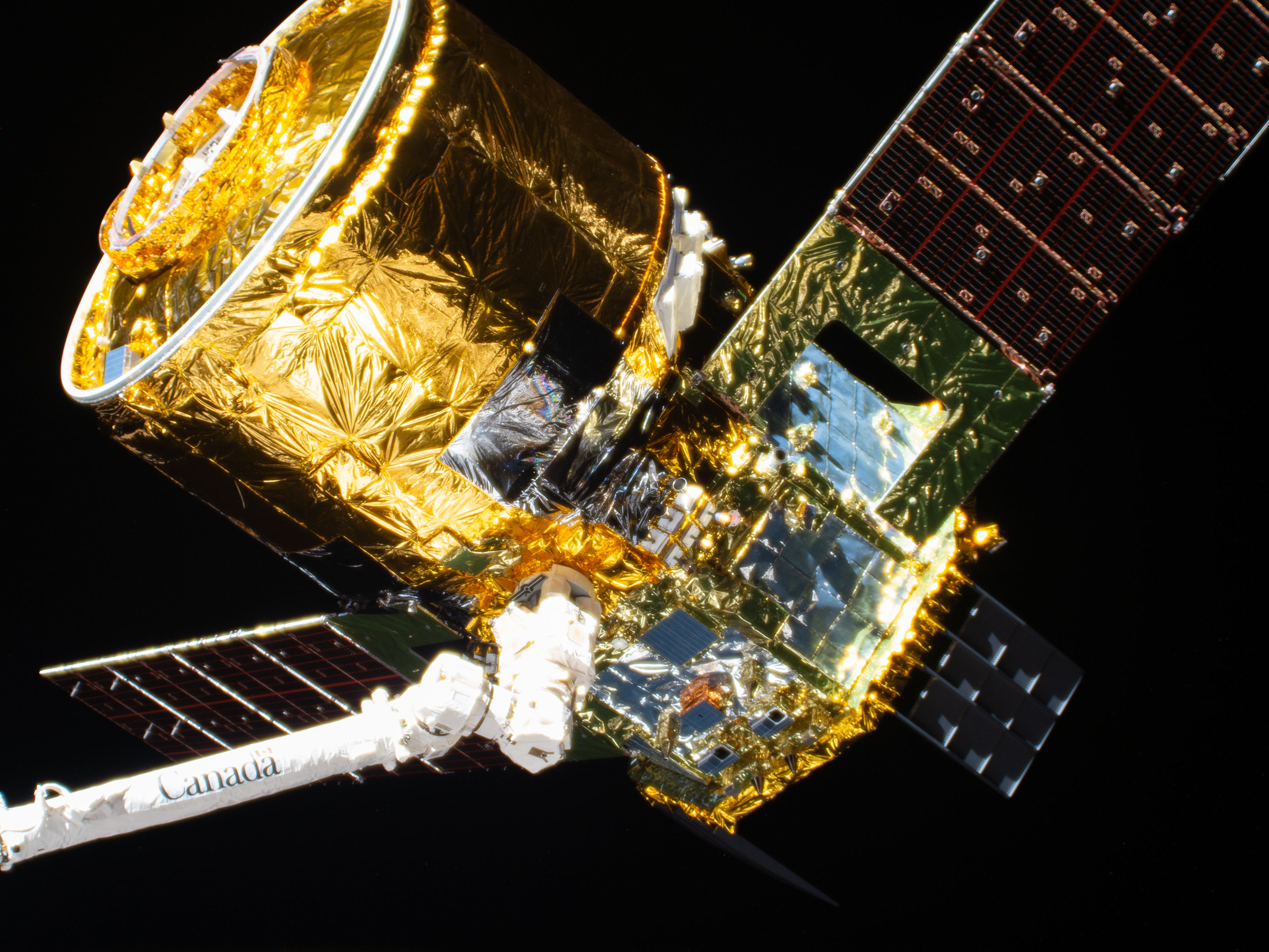
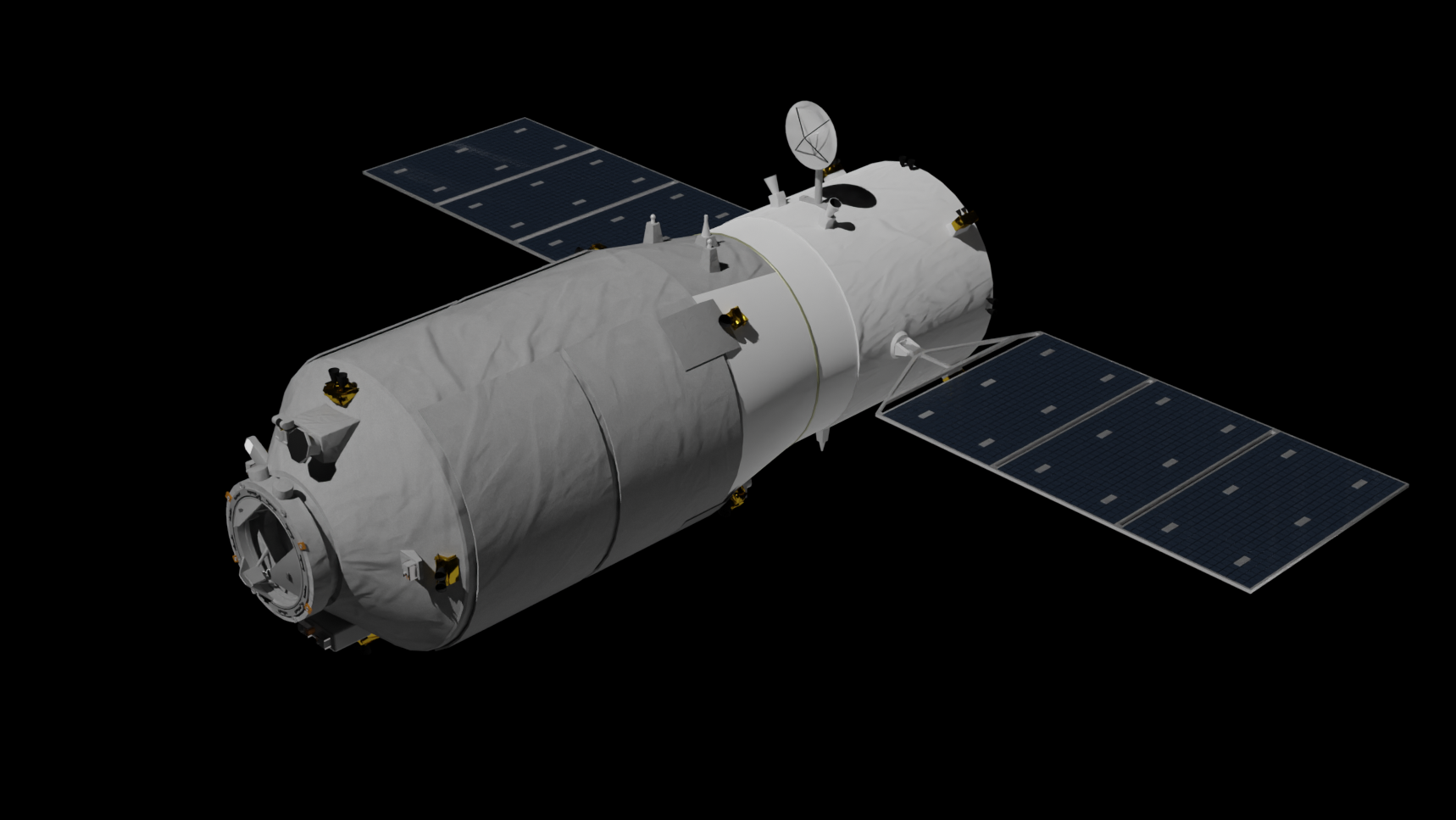
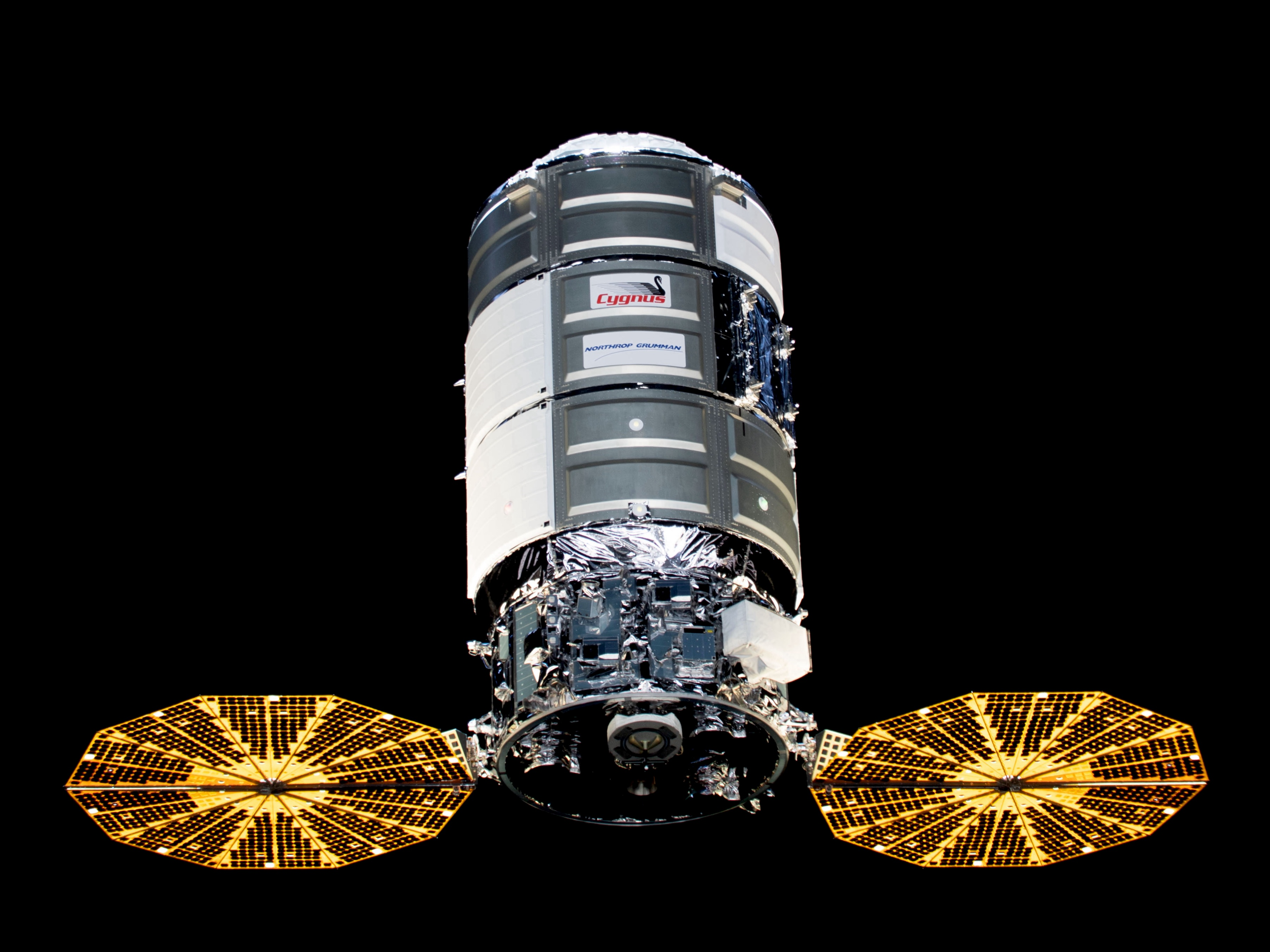
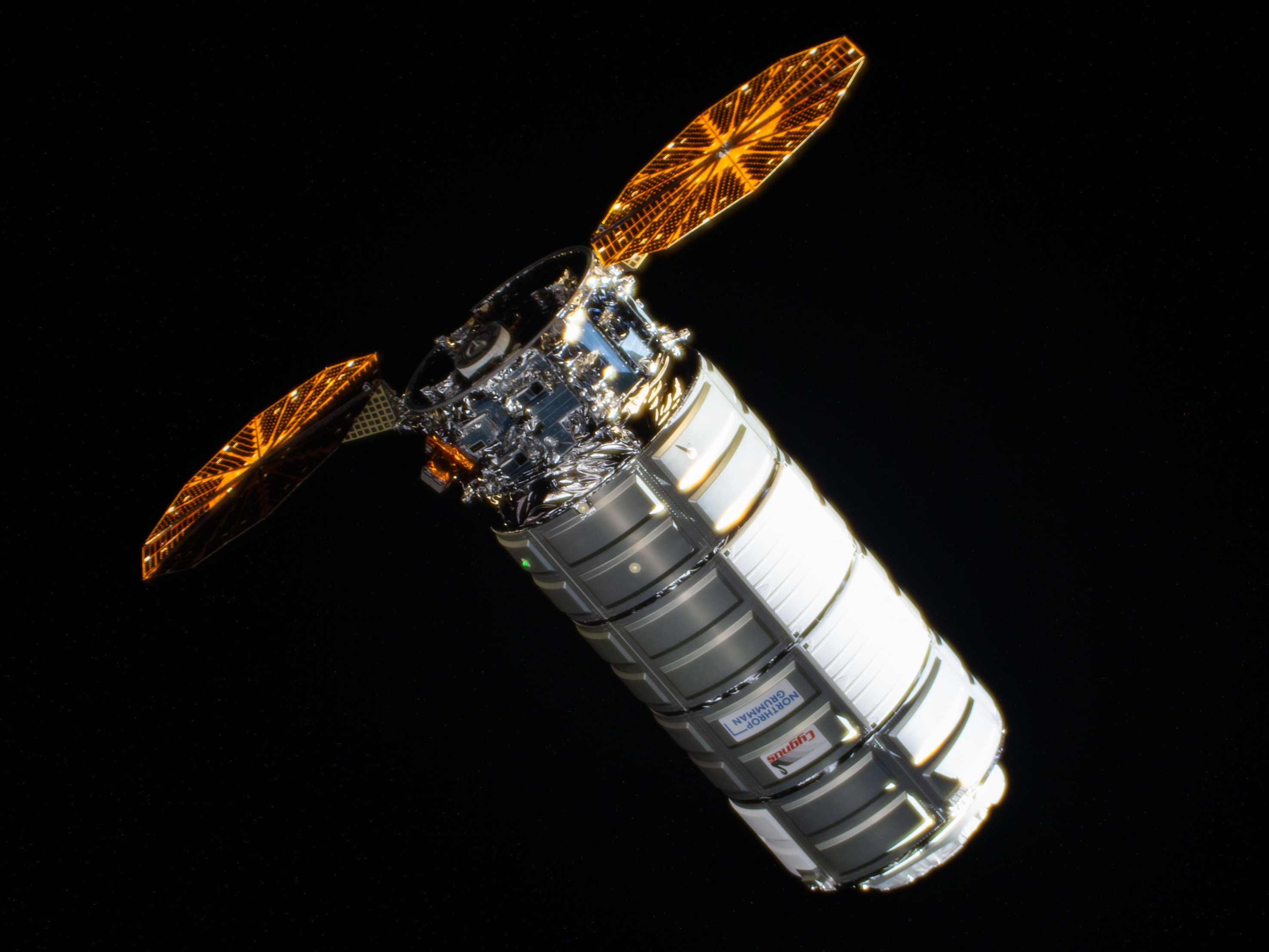
The six currently active space station cargo vehicles. Clockwise from top left: Progress, Cargo Dragon 2, HTV-X, Cygnus XL, Enhanced Cygnus, Tianzhou

A number of different spacecraft have been used to carry cargo to and from space stations. This list does not include crewed spacecraft.

Table code key
	Spacecraft under development
	Spacecraft is operational
	Retired spacecraft
§	Pressurized / Unpressurized payload capacity

Spacecraft	Origin	Manufacturer	Launch vehicle	Length (m)	Dry mass (kg)	Launch mass (kg)	Payload (kg) §	Payload volume (m^{3})	Return payload (kg) §	Diameter (m)	Generated power (W)	Docking method	Status (No. flights)
TKS	Soviet Union	TsKBM	Proton-K	17.51	13,688	21,620	12,600			4.15	2,400	Remote control	Retired (4)
Progress 7K-TG	Soviet Union	Energia	Soyuz-U						None			Remote control	Retired (43)
Progress‑M (11F615A55)	Soviet Union; Russia	Energia	Soyuz-U; Soyuz-U2	7.2		7,130	2,600	7.6	150 (Note: With optional Raduga capsule.)	2.72	600	Automated	Retired (66)
Progress‑M1	Russia	Energia	Soyuz-U; Soyuz-FG						None			Automated	Retired (11)
Progress‑M (11F615A60)	Russia	Energia	Soyuz-U	7.2		7,150	2,230	7.6	None	2.72	700	Automated	Retired (27 + 2 failed)
Cygnus	USA	Orbital	Antares	5.14	1,500		2,000	18.9	None	3.07	3,500	RMS berthing	Retired (3 + 1 failed)
Dragon 1	USA	SpaceX	Falcon 9	6.1	4,200	10,200 (Note: 4,200kg dry mass + 6,000 kg up mass)	3,310 (max) 2,200 (ave) (Note: In any combination of pressurized or unpressurized.)	10.0 / (14 or 34) (Note: 34 unpressurized with extended trunk)	3,000 (Note: Capsule return.)	3.7	2,000	RMS berthing	Retired (19 + 1 failed)
ATV	Europe	Airbus	Ariane 5ES	10.3	10,470	20,750	7,667	48	None	4.5	3,800	Automated	Retired (5)
HTV	Japan	JAXA	H-IIB	10	10,500	16,500	3,000 / 1,000	14 / 16	20 (Note: With optional HSRC.)	4.4	200	RMS berthing	Retired (9)
Tianzhou (basic)	China	CAST	Long March 7	10.6		13,500	6,900 (Note: Including propellant.)	18.1	None	3.35		Automated	Retired (5)
Progress-MS	Russia	Energia	Soyuz 2.1a	7.2		7,150	2,230		None			Automated	Operational
Cargo Dragon 2	USA	SpaceX	Falcon 9	8.1	6,400		3,307	9.3 / 37	2,507	4.0		Automated	Operational
Enhanced Cygnus	USA	Northrop Grumman	Antares (Note: Has also launched on Atlas V and Falcon 9.)	6.39	1,800		3,750	27	None	3.07	3,500	RMS berthing	Operational
Tianzhou (improved)	China	CAST	Long March 7	10.6		14,000	7,400 (Note: Including propellant.)	22.5 (~40 total)	None	3.35		Automated	Operational
Cygnus XL	USA	Northrop Grumman	Antares (Note: Has also launched on Falcon 9.)	8	2,300		5,000	36	None	3.07	3,500	RMS berthing	Operational
HTV-X	Japan	JAXA	H3	10 (Note: 10 with cargo module, 6.2 without.)	8,300	16,000, combined	4,069 / 1,750	78 (Note: Combined.)	None	4.4	1,000	RMS berthing (Note: Technology trial of an automated IDSS docking port fitted in place of unpressurised cargo module being planned.)	Operational
Dream Chaser	USA	Sierra Space	Vulcan Centaur	16.8			5,000 / 500		1,750			RMS berthing	Development
Dragon XL	USA	SpaceX	Falcon Heavy				5,000		None			Automated	Development
Argo	Europe	Rocket Factory Augsburg					3,400	<13	≥1,000			Automated	Development
Nyx	Europe	The Exploration Company	Ariane 6				4,000		2,500 / 100			Automated	Development
Qingzhou	China	Innovation Academy for Microsatellites of CAS	Kinetica-2						None			Automated	Development
Haolong	China	Chengdu Aircraft Research and Design Institute	Zhuque-3									Automated	Development

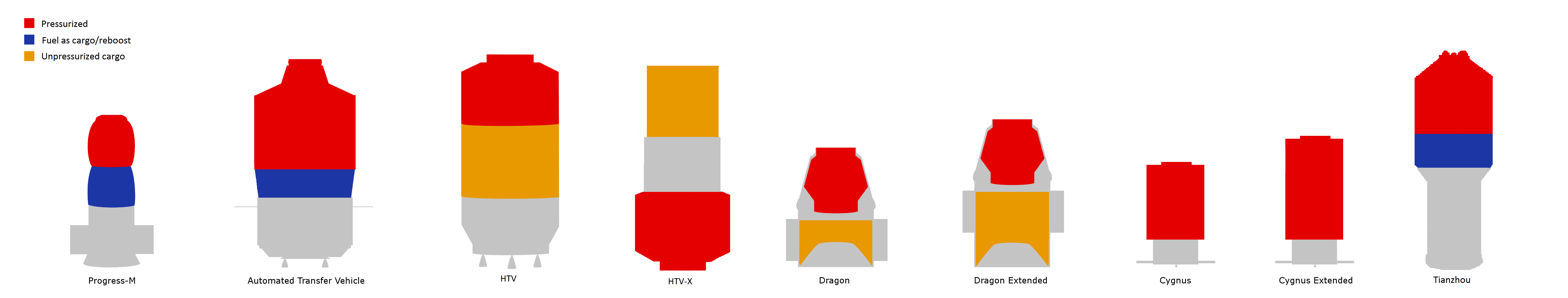

== See also ==
- Comparison of crewed space vehicles
- Comparison of orbital launch systems
- Comparison of orbital rocket engines
