= Aoba (spacecraft) =

Japanese spacecraft for demonstrating atmospheric reentry

- Operator: (Japan) ElevationSpace
- Website: elevation-space.com/en/aoba

Spacecraft properties
- Bus: ELS-R100
- Launch mass: 220 kg

Start of mission
- Launch date: NET 2027
- Rocket: (Germany) Spectrum

Aoba is a Japanese technology-demonstration spacecraft under development by ElevationSpace as the first orbital test of its ELS-R series of space recovery platforms. The spacecraft is designed to remain in orbit for approximately six months, conducting biological experiments, including research involving Euglena gracilis. Its reentry capsule will then separate from the spacecraft and demonstrate atmospheric reentry and ocean splashdown while returning biological samples to Earth. The mission is expected to launch no earlier than 2027 aboard Isar Aerospace's Spectrum rocket.

== Development ==
Aoba is a technology demonstration spacecraft featuring a reentry capsule under development by the Japanese company ElevationSpace as the first orbital test of their ELS-R series of space recovery platforms. The 220 kg spacecraft will launch on Isar Aerospace's Spectrum rocket and stay in orbit for approximately six months, performing biological experiments (eg. growing Euglena gracilis). Then a small reentry capsule will separate from the rest of the spacecraft to demonstrate safe atmospheric reentry and ocean splashdown, delivering biological samples to Earth. The spacecraft is expected to launch no earlier than 2027.

Aoba is named after Mount Aoba in Sendai, where ElevationSpace is based, and is described as Japan's first private reentry satellite. It was developed with JAXA and Tohoku University and uses lift-guided reentry, a technique for returning small satellites that Japan has demonstrated and that is intended to give a gentle landing. It will launch from Andøya Space in Norway on Isar Aerospace's Spectrum rocket, for which ElevationSpace was the first Asian customer.

The company chose Spectrum for its flexible launch schedule and its ability to place the spacecraft directly into the target orbit, and the mission was originally booked for the second half of 2026. Besides the Euglena experiment, run with Euglena Co., Aoba carries experimental payloads from several companies. As of 2024 the company reported tests of the capsule's splashdown and separation and of an in-house hybrid thruster in vacuum, and in June 2026 it said assembly was close to completion.
