= Fraunhofer Institute for High-Speed Dynamics =

Materials research facility in Germany

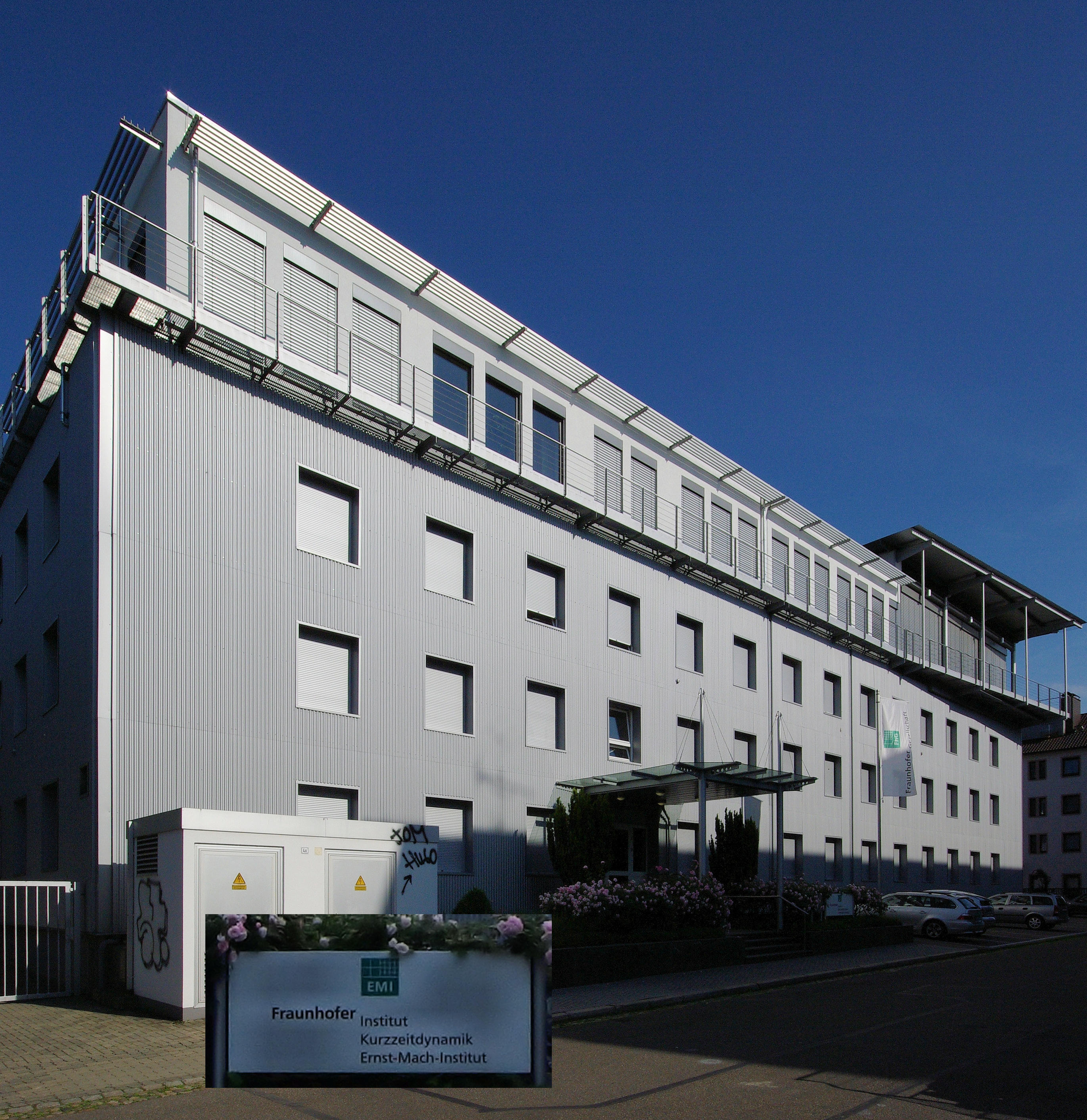
- Fraunhofer EMI in Freiburg im Breisgau, in 2009
- Other name: German: Fraunhofer-Institut für Kurzzeitdynamik; Ernst Mach Institute; Fraunhofer EMI
- Parent institution: Fraunhofer-Gesellschaft
- Focus: Applied research of materials science and high-speed measurement
- Key people: Ernst Mach (honoree)
- Location: Freiburg im Breisgau, Germany
- Coordinates: 48°00′03″N 7°50′48″E
- Interactive map of Fraunhofer Institute for High-Speed Dynamics

The Fraunhofer Institute for High-Speed Dynamics (German: Fraunhofer-Institut für Kurzzeitdynamik), commonly known as the Ernst Mach Institute and also by the abbreviation Fraunhofer EMI, is a research institute of the Fraunhofer Society, located in Freiburg im Breisgau, Germany. Its activities are applied research and development in the fields of materials science and high-speed processes. The institute also has offices in Efringen-Kirchen and Kandern.

The name "Ernst Mach Institute" is named for the physicist Ernst Mach (1838–1916), who first used high-speed photography to visualize ballistic and gas-dynamic processes.

== See also ==
- NEOShield
