= The Exploration Company =

European spacecraft manufacturer

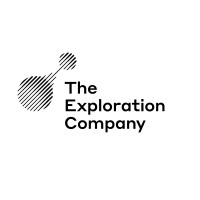
- Industry: Aerospace
- Founded: July 2021; 5 years ago
- Headquarters: Gauting, Germany; Le Haillan, France
- Key people: Hélène Huby (CEO)
- Products: Nyx
- Number of employees: 400 (2026)
- Website: exploration.space

The Exploration Company (TEC) is a European aerospace company developing reusable spacecraft. TEC has dual headquarters. They are, alongside its main facilities, located in the Munich area (Gauting and Oberpfaffenhofen) and Bordeaux area (Le Haillan and Mérignac); with additional offices in Italy (Turin), the United States (Houston) and the MENA region. The company embraces a pan-European identity. TEC was founded in July 2021 by Hélène Huby (CEO) with a group of space engineers (Artur Koop, Sebastien Reichstadt, Pierre Vinet and Jon Reijneveld) with whom she had worked on European space programs at Airbus and ArianeGroup, including Orion-ESM and ATV. TEC's main project is developing Nyx, a family of modular, reusable spacecraft designed for missions to Low Earth Orbit (LEO), lunar orbit, and the Moon. Its vehicles aim to serve cargo transport, re-entry missions, and future human spaceflight needs.

== Spacecraft ==
=== Nyx ===
The Nyx Earth vehicle is composed of a cylindrical service module and a conical space capsule. It measures 4 meters in diameter and 7 meters in height with a total mass of 8 tonnes. It will be capable of carrying 4,000 kg of payload into low Earth orbit (LEO) for a maximum of 6 months, with up to 2,500 kg of pressurized cargo and 100 kg of unpressurized cargo being onboard the vehicle. The service module of the vehicle will be able to transport 1,400 kg of unpressurized cargo. Nyx Earth will be able to fly freely for up to six months, and will be capable of docking to a space station in LEO.

Although the company's first missions are cargo-only, Nyx Earth is designed to eventually be able to transport humans. The crewed version, capable of transporting 4 to 5 people to LEO, is expected to be available in the mid-2030s.

Nyx Earth's interfaces are open, and its operating system is open-source software, which contributes to other space exploration projects whose technologies can inter-operate. The Nyx capsule is modular in nature, with several configuration options for different mission objectives and destinations, while also being capable of launching on multiple vehicles. Nyx Earth can be reused five times, and will be capable of in-orbit refueling.

Nyx Earth uses green propellants for altitude control and docking (high-test peroxide), as well as cryogenic bio-methane & oxygen for reaching lunar destinations. The Nyx Earth spacecraft's initial missions will use the DS250 hypergolic bipropellant thrusters provided by Agile Space.

==== Developmental flights ====
The Exploration Company developed two smaller-scale demonstrators. The first, nicknamed Bikini, is a capsule 60 centimeters in diameter weighing approximately 40 kilograms. It was launched on the inaugural flight of Ariane 6 to validate the general profile of the capsule and thermal protection but it never reentered as the upper stage failed to deorbit.

The second demonstrator, named Mission Possible, was a larger capsule measuring 2.5 m in diameter and weighing 1,600 kg, capable of carrying 300 kg of payload (reserved by the European Space Agency, the French CNES, and German DLR). Intended to validate a more controlled reentry with propulsion and landing via parachute, it was launched by the Falcon 9 rideshare mission Transporter-14 in June 2025, operated nominally in orbit, re-entered the atmosphere, and re-established communication after the expected reentry blackout. However, communication with the capsule was lost before expected splash down. The company plans to re-fly the mission.

As of 2023, the full-scale version, named Mission Odyssey, was planned to fly in 2026. In November 2025, just before the ESA ministerial council expected to make a decision about further funding for the LEO Cargo Return Service (LCRS) initiative, TEC's CEO Hélène Huby said that with ESA funding, the company can perform the full-scale demonstration mission by 2028.

=== Nyx Cislunar ===
The Nyx Cislunar vehicle, of similar design to Nyx Earth, is proposed to deliver up to 5,000 kg to lunar orbit and up to 2,000 kg back to Earth.

=== Nyx Moon ===
The Nyx Moon lunar lander, of simple cylindrical design without the re-entry capsule, is proposed to deliver cargo to lunar surface. It will use the company's GOX/GCH_{4}-powered Breeze thrusters. This engine was test fired for the first time in July 2025. As of 2024, the maiden flight of Nyx Moon was expected to take place in 2028.

==== Lunar lander demonstrators ====
TEC intends to perform flight tests with the ONEIROS hopper vehicle in the UAE in 2027, followed by a technology demonstration Lunar lander named Hilal.

=== Oura ===
TEC is developing the Oura spacecraft designed to dock with and refuel satellites in orbit. The project is supported by ESA's In-Space Proof-of-Concepts (InSPoC) initiative, part of Future Launchers Preparatory Programme (FLPP). Its first launch is planned for 2028.

== History ==
- July 2021 – The Exploration Company was founded by Hélène Huby, together with Sebastien Reichstadt, Artur Koop, Pierre Vinet, and Jon Reijneveld.
- November 2021 – TEC raised 5 million euros.
- October 2022 – TEC was among the space firms selected to be financed by the French government's "France 2030" investment plan for its work on its liquid methane rocket engine.

=== 2023 ===
- February 2023 – TEC announced a fundraising of 40 million euros to develop its Nyx capsule, successfully completed, making it the largest series A in the space industry in Europe.
- 29 May2023 – TEC was awarded a contract by the European Space Agency (ESA) to study solutions for future European single-use and reusable spacecraft, covering micro-mini, medium, heavy and crewed applications. In total, ESA awarded four contracts on this topic. The other three went to the companies ArianeGroup, Avio and SENER. These four contracts are intended to contribute to the realization of ESA's Vision 2030+, which was initiated in 2021. It aims to create small, medium, and heavy support vessels based on a common set of reusable, standardized modules.
- July 2023 – TEC was once again one of the space companies that secured financing from the same French state investment plan; it did so this time for its DEMARLUS project.
- September 2023 – TEC announced an agreement with Axiom Space for the cargo supply of its station in the form of a pre-contract subject to validation of technological milestones during the development of its spacecraft.

=== 2024 ===
- January 2024 – TEC began working on a reusable rocket engine, Typhoon.
- May 2024 – TEC was selected, along with Thales Alenia Space, for ESA's LEO Cargo Return Service (LCRS).
- June 2024 – TEC signed a contract with Vast Space for cargo missions.
- July 2024 – TEC launched its first demonstration mission, nicknamed Bikini, on Ariane 6's first flight.
- November 2024 – TEC raised $160 million in Series B funding for the development of its Nyx cargo vehicle.

=== 2025 ===
- February 2025 – The German aerospace agency DLR announced that it had signed a contract with TEC to serve as an anchor customer for its microgravity research service using the Nyx vehicle.
- June 2025 – TEC launched its second demonstration mission, named Mission Possible, on Falcon 9.
- July 2025 – TES test fired the Nyx Moon's Breeze thrusters for the first time at the company's testing facility in Bordeaux.
- August 2025 – The Nyx Earth spacecraft passed Phase 1 of the International Space Station Safety Review.
- October 2025
  - TEC opened its new headquarters in Oberpfaffenhofen, Germany.
  - TEC concluded an extensive wind-tunnel testing campaign, validating the Nyx Earth's behaviour across the entire flight regime from subsonic to hypersonic conditions, at the DLR's facilities in Cologne.
- November 2025
  - TEC completed an initial test campaign of the Micrometeoroid and Orbital Debris (MMOD) shield of Nyx at the German Institute for High-Speed Dynamics.
  - TEC acquired the German metal additive manufacturing company Thrustworks.
  - TEC inaugurated a new facility in Le Haillan, France, hosting the company's propulsion, thermal protection, and systems engineering teams, as well as the mission control centre.
  - TEC concluded the first test campaign of an innovative resonance igniter for rocket engines that uses interacting pressure waves to start an engine. This work was supported by ESA's Thrust! initiative.
- December 2025
  - TEC awarded a contract to Redwire Belgium to build two IDSS-compliant International Berthing and Docking Mechanisms (IBDMs) for the Nyx spacecraft.
  - TEC started negotiating about a possible acquisition of the UK-based rocket company Orbex but the takeover fell through and in February 2026, Orbex begun insolvency proceedings.

=== 2026 ===
- January 2026 – TEC conducted 20 splashdown tests with a 1:4 scale model of the Nyx capsule at the National Research Council's Institute of Marine Engineering in Rome.
- February 2026
  - A consortium including TEC was selected by ESA to lead one of two parallel "Lunar Remote Camp" studies.
  - TEC received the pressurised module (from CNIM Systèmes Industriels) and the front shield (from PERSICO GROUP) for the structural test model of Nyx.
- March 2026 – TEC completed initial pressure testing of the Nyx structural test model pressurised structure.
- April 2026
  - The dynamic vibration test campaign of the Nyx structural test model begun at ESTEC. The campaign ended in May 2026 after 69 individual tests with multiple payload configurations.
  - TEC signed a memorandum of understanding with the Spanish company OCCAM Space to develop a mechanism for separating Nyx from its launch vehicle.
- May 2026
  - TEC completed the first test fire campaign of a full prototype of its Huracan rocket engine at Airborne Engineering's facility in Westcott, UK. The 15 kN, throttleable, restartable, methalox engine is envisioned for the company's future lunar landers. The test campaign was supported by the European Space Agency (ESA).
- June 2026 – TEC completed a drop test in the Mojave Desert in which they dropped dedicated Drop Test Vehicle and tested both the drogue parachutes and main parachutes. A helicopter hoisted the vehicle up to 2.8 km and released it over a designated landing site. The full descent sequence went as planned with successful deployment of both the drogue parachutes and the mains.
- September 2026
  - TEC has raised €387 million in a Series C funding round for the development of Nyx and the Storm rocket engine.
  - During the International Space Summit in Paris, ESA awarded a €760 million ALADDIN (LEO Cargo Return Service phase 2) contract to TEC for up to three space station cargo flights of Nyx. On the same day, it became publicly known that the company signed a contract with Arianespace to launch the first Nyx flight on Ariane 6. That flight was expected no later than 2029.
