= VORTEX (spaceplane) =

Future European spaceplane

- Manufacturer: (France) Dassault Aviation (Germany) OHB SE
- Website: space-vortex.com/en/

Specifications
- Spacecraft type: Spaceplane

Vortex-S compared to other European reusable spacecraft: Nyx and Space Rider

VORTEX (Véhicule Orbital Réutilisable de Transport et d’EXploration) is a future European reusable spaceplane under development by a consortium led by Dassault Aviation and OHB with the support of the French government. The vehicle is envisioned as serving both civilian and military applications, including resupplying space stations, and having the potential of future upgrades to carry astronauts. The first test flight of a subscale prototype, VORTEX-D, is expected in 2028.

== See also ==
- Hermes (spacecraft)
- SOAR (spaceplane)
