= SpaceX Dragon =

Family of SpaceX spacecraft

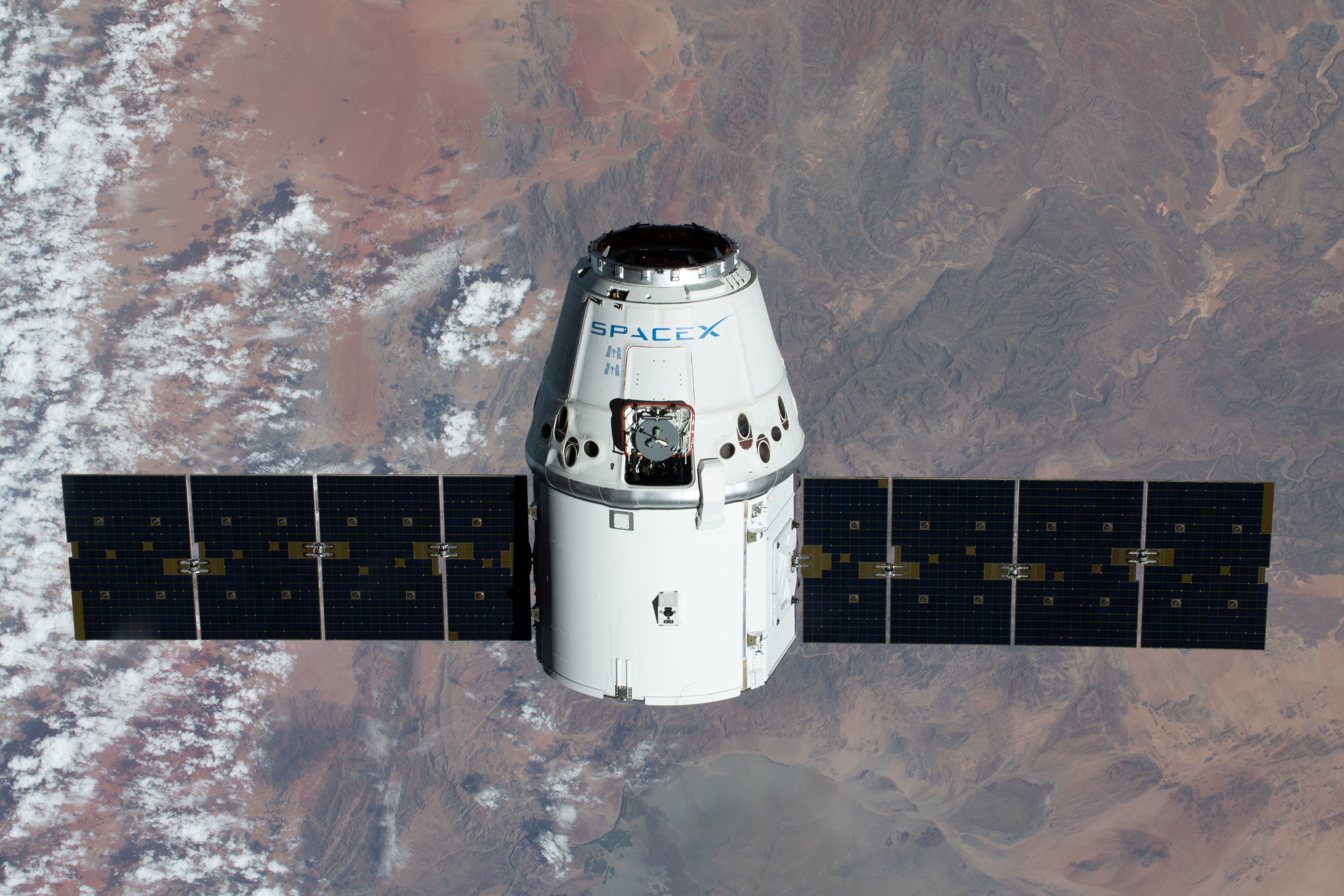
Dragon 1 C112 approaching the ISS

Dragon is a family of spacecraft developed and produced by the American publicly traded space transportation company SpaceX.

The first variant, later named Dragon 1, flew 23 cargo missions to the International Space Station (ISS) between 2010 and 2020 before retiring. Design of this version, not designed to carry astronauts, was funded by NASA with $396 million awarded through the Commercial Orbital Transportation Services program and contracted to ferry cargo under the Commercial Resupply Services (CRS) program.

An improved version, the Dragon 2, was introduced in 2019 and has both crewed and cargo versions. The first un-crewed flight test (Demo-1) took place in March 2019, followed by a crewed flight test (Demo-2) in May 2020. Since those flight tests, the Crew Dragon has become one of the primary spacecraft ferrying crew to and from the ISS. The Cargo Dragon continues to carry cargo under the CRS program.

SpaceX has also proposed versions named Red Dragon for Mars exploration and Dragon XL to provide Gateway Logistics Services to the Lunar Gateway.

== Name ==
SpaceX's CEO, Elon Musk, named the spacecraft after the 1963 song "Puff, the Magic Dragon" by Peter, Paul and Mary, reportedly as a response to critics who considered his spaceflight projects impossible. Early on, it had been named Magic Dragon, and t-shirts had been printed with this name. A crew capsule mockup model named "Magic Dragon" was also created to show to VIPs prior to program start. As late as September 2012, SpaceX board member Steve Jurvetson was still referring to it as "The Magic Dragon, Puffed to the sea." That was his caption to a photo of the capsule several months after it had completed its COTS 2 demo flight where the spacecraft had accomplished its first docking with the ISS. This song, ostensibly composed for children, had long been associated with perceived references to smoking marijuana. In 2008, Elon Musk confirmed that the association between the song and marijuana was the reason behind the name Dragon, saying that "so many people thought I [must be] smoking weed to do this venture."

== Dragon 1 ==
Dragon 1 was the original Dragon iteration, providing cargo service to the ISS. It flew 23 missions between 2010 and 2020, when it was retired. On May 25, 2012, NASA astronaut Don Pettit operated the Canadarm2 to grapple the first SpaceX Dragon and berth it to the Harmony module. This marked the first time a private spacecraft had ever rendezvoused with the ISS. The Dragon capsule was carrying supplies for the ISS, and the successful capture demonstrated the feasibility of using privately developed spacecraft to resupply the station. Pettit was also the first to enter the uncrewed supply ship on May 26, making him the first astronaut in the history of space exploration to successfully enter a commercially-built and operated spacecraft in orbit. During the capture, he was quoted saying, "Houston, Station, we've got us a dragon by the tail."

== Dragon 2 ==
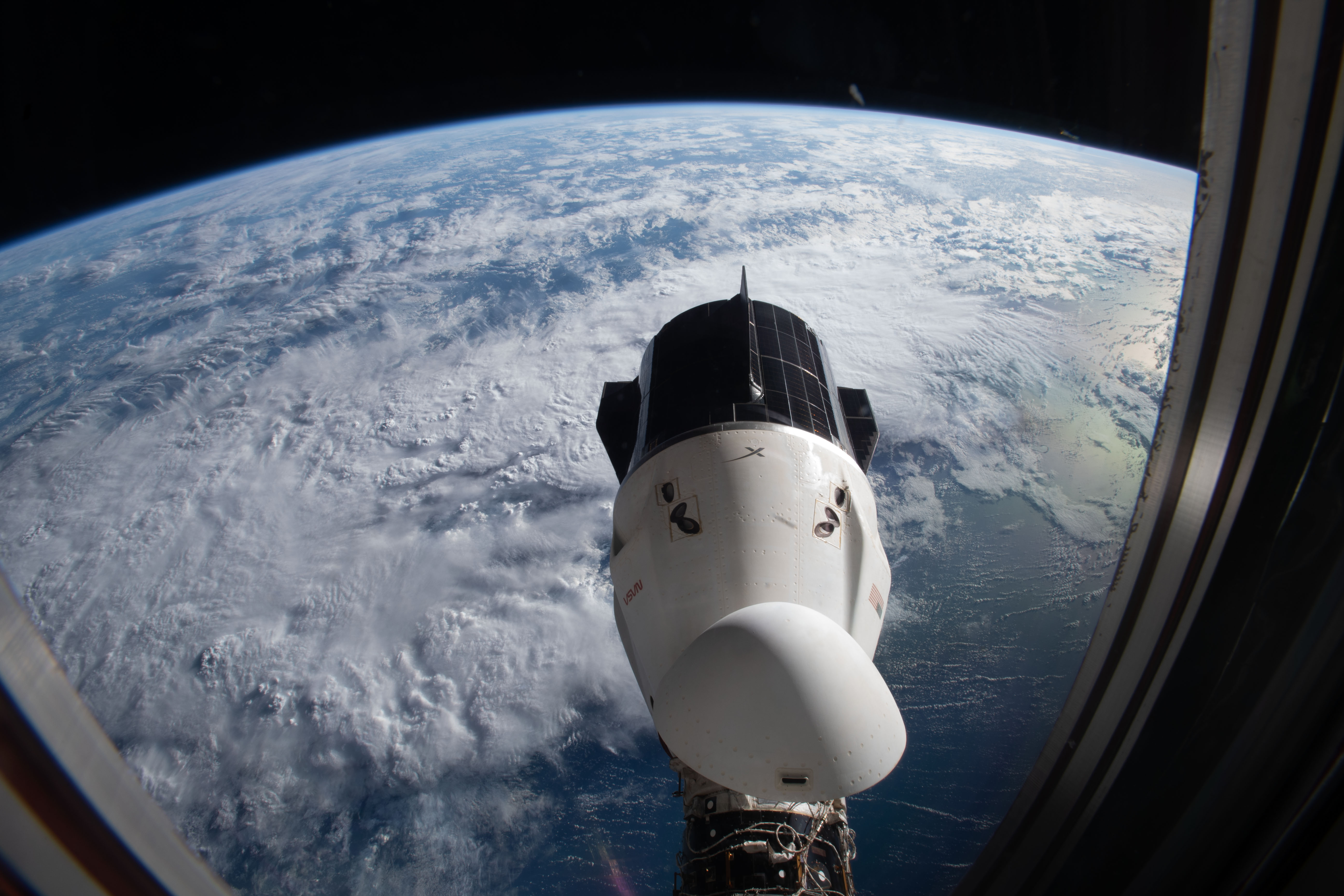
Crew Dragon Endurance docked to the ISS

An improved version, the Dragon 2, was introduced in 2019 and has two versions: Crew Dragon and Cargo Dragon. The first un-crewed flight test (Demo-1) took place in March 2019, followed by a crewed flight test (Demo-2) in May 2020.

The Crew Dragon is one of the primary spacecraft ferrying crew members to and from the ISS and on private missions. The Cargo Dragon carries cargo to the ISS under the CRS program.

== Red Dragon ==
Red Dragon was a cancelled version of the Dragon spacecraft that had been previously proposed to fly farther than Earth orbit and transit to Mars via interplanetary space. In addition to SpaceX's own privately funded plans for an eventual Mars mission, NASA Ames Research Center had developed a concept called Red Dragon. Red Dragon was to be a low-cost Mars mission that would use Falcon Heavy as the launch vehicle and injection vehicle, and the SpaceX Dragon 2-based capsule to enter the atmosphere of Mars. The concept was originally envisioned for launch in 2018 as a NASA Discovery mission, then alternatively for 2022, but was never formally submitted for funding within NASA. The mission would have been designed to return samples from Mars to Earth at a fraction of the cost of NASA's own sample-return mission, which was projected in 2015 to cost US$6 billion.

On April 27, 2016, SpaceX announced its plan to go ahead and launch a modified Dragon lander to Mars in 2018. However, Musk cancelled the Red Dragon program in July 2017 to focus on developing the Starship system instead. The modified Red Dragon capsule would have performed all entry, descent and landing (EDL) functions needed to deliver payloads of 1,000 kilograms (2,200 lb) or more to the Martian surface without using a parachute. Preliminary analysis showed that the capsule's atmospheric drag would slow it enough for the final stage of its descent to be within the abilities of its SuperDraco retro-propulsion thrusters.

== Dragon XL ==
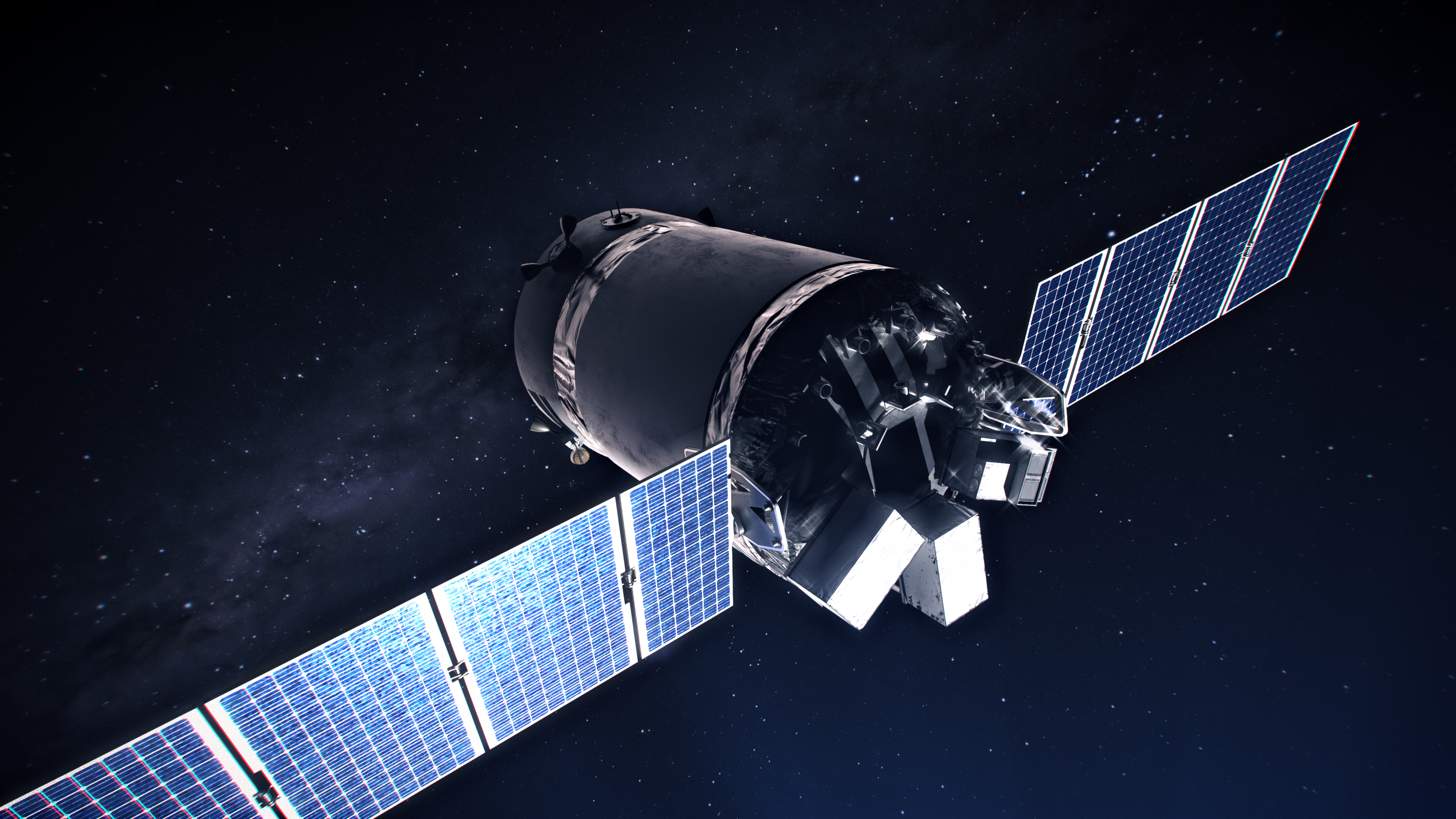
Rendering of the proposed SpaceX Dragon XL

On March 27, 2020, SpaceX revealed the Dragon XL resupply spacecraft to carry pressurized and unpressurized cargo, experiments and other supplies to NASA's planned Lunar Gateway under a Gateway Logistics Services (GLS) contract. The equipment delivered by Dragon XL missions could include sample collection materials, spacesuits and other items astronauts may need on the Gateway and on the surface of the Moon, according to NASA. It was to launch on SpaceX Falcon Heavy rockets from LC-39A at the Kennedy Space Center in Florida.

The Dragon XL was planned to stay at the Gateway for 6 to 12 months at a time, when research payloads inside and outside the cargo vessel could be operated remotely, even when crews are not present. Its payload capacity was expected to be more than 5,000 kilograms (11,000 lb) to lunar orbit. There is no requirement for a return to Earth. At the end of the mission the Dragon XL must be able to undock and dispose of the same mass it can bring to the Gateway, by moving the spacecraft to a heliocentric orbit.

On February 22, 2023, NASA discussed the Dragon XL's development for the first time since its 2020 unveiling, with Mark Wiese, NASA's manager of deep space logistics for the Gateway program, answering during a panel at SpaceCom that NASA has been working with SpaceX to run a series of studies to refine the Dragon XL design and examine cargo configurations and other capabilities that could be enabled by the spacecraft. Wiese also elaborated that Dragon XL would be used for initial missions, and stating that "[NASA] talked to [SpaceX] about Starship evolution and how it all worked together, but we’re not there yet because it's still in a development phase" hinting that Starship will eventually replace Dragon XL once it completes development.

On March 29, 2024, NASA released an article outlining the mission of Artemis IV, which was then planned as the first crewed mission to the Lunar Gateway in 2028, stating that the Dragon XL would be used to resupply and carry science experiments, and that Artemis IV would take place concurrently with a Starship launch that would dock at the Gateway and help with its assembly. Work on Gateway logistics was paused in 2025 after the administration's fiscal year 2026 budget proposal sought to cancel Gateway. In January 2026, Wiese said NASA was at a "crossroads" between two potential architectures with SpaceX, having studied using Starship in place of Dragon XL. On March 24, 2026, NASA announced it was halting development of the Gateway to focus on a lunar surface base, leaving the future of Dragon XL uncertain.

== See also ==
- Comparison of space station cargo vehicles
- List of human spaceflight programs
- Space Shuttle successors
