= Thou Art the Man =

Short story by Edgar Allan Poe

- Short story by Edgar Allan Poe
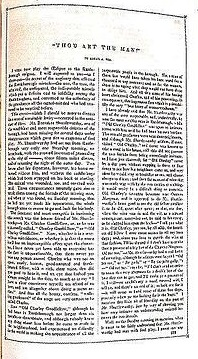
- Godey's Lady's Book, November 1844
- Country: United States
- Language: English

Publication
- Publisher: Godey's Lady's Book, Louis Godey
- Media type: Print (periodical)
- Publication date: November 1844

"Thou Art the Man", originally titled "Thou Art the Man!", is a short story by Edgar Allan Poe, first published in 1844. It is an early experiment in detective fiction, like Poe's "The Murders in the Rue Morgue", though it is generally considered an inferior story.

The plot involves a man wrongfully accused of murdering his uncle Barnabas Shuttleworthy, whose corpse is missing. An unnamed narrator finds the body, suspects the victim's good friend Charles Goodfellow, and sets up an elaborate plot to expose him. The corpse appears to come back to life and points to the best friend, exclaiming "Thou art the man!" The title and the climactic line refer to the second Book of Samuel and also echo a line from the "Great Moon Hoax".

== Plot summary ==
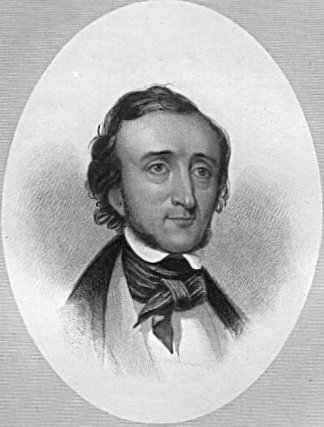
Portrait of Poe from 1845; he did not grow his distinctive mustache until a few years after.

In the town of Rattleborough, the wealthy Barnabas Shuttleworthy goes missing. His nephew and heir is accused of murdering him and is arrested. Soon after, Shuttleworthy's good friend Charles Goodfellow receives a letter from a wine firm informing him that shortly before his disappearance, Mr. Shuttleworthy had ordered a case of "Chateau-Margaux of the antelope brand, violet seal," Goodfellow's favorite vintage, to be sent to him. Mr. Goodfellow arranges for a party to break open the new wine. But when the narrator (a denizen of Rattleborough and acquaintance of Shuttleworthy and Goodfellow) pries open the case, there is no wine. Instead there is the decaying corpse of Mr. Shuttleworthy, who looks to Goodfellow and somehow utters, "Thou art the man". The terrified Goodfellow confesses to killing Shuttleworthy, after which he immediately drops dead, with the exonerated nephew set free.

It turns out that the narrator had orchestrated this gruesome turn of events. Suspecting Goodfellow all along, the narrator discovered that Goodfellow had framed the nephew. He also managed to find Shuttleworthy's corpse on his own, and knowing that his efforts would not be effective without a confession, he forged the letter from the firm, and sent the "case of wine" himself to Goodfellow. The corpse's voice was provided by the narrator himself, employing his ventriloquism skills.

== Publication history ==
"Thou Art the Man" originally appeared as "Thou Art the Man!" and was credited as being written "by Edgar A. Poe" in the November 1844 issue of Godey's Lady's Book. The editor of Godey's made at least one editorial change from Poe's manuscript, changing "old cock" to "old fellow," presumably for a more "family-friendly" reading, though it is not believed Poe agreed to the change. The roll manuscript is in the Poe collection of the New York Public Library's Division of Manuscripts and Archives.

== Analysis ==
Like "The Murders in the Rue Morgue", "Thou Art the Man" is an experiment in the detective fiction genre which Poe invented and called "tales of ratiocination". This story, however, is narrated by the detective himself, who must mystify the reader by presenting a problem to which he already knows the solution. Guilty parties in both stories are shocked into revealing their secrets: the sailor in "The Murders in the Rue Morgue" is shocked into revealing his escaped orangutan, and in "Thou Art the Man" the criminal is revealed when seeing his victim come back to life. The story is also presented humorously, satirizing the rural country town and making a caricature of its residents. The story can be considered a burlesque of Poe's own tales of ratiocination.

=== Allusions ===
"David is rebuked by Nathan for his adultery and confesses his sin" (Maerten de Vos, 16th century)

The title of this story comes from 2 Samuel 12:7 in the Bible, where the prophet Nathan accused King David of arranging for the death of Uriah in order to marry his wife Bathsheba. Nathan had used a parable of a rich man, with a large flock of sheep, who steals the only lamb of a poor man to feed his guest. David determined that such a man deserved to die for his greed, to which Nathan responded "Thou art the man".

That climactic line also seems to reference "The Great Moon Hoax" from 1835. Similar to Poe's tale, a pivotal scene involves one of the characters springing from his chair "in an ecstasy of conviction and leaping halfway to the ceiling," exclaiming the same line. Poe certainly knew of the story, having worked alongside one of the supposed writers at the New York Sun newspaper.

The wine mentioned is from a real vineyard, Chateau-Margaux of Bordeaux, but the description "antelope brand, violet seal" is probably intended to be comedic — it implies that Goodfellow is so unsophisticated that he identifies wines by the appearance of the bottle, rather than the vintage or variety, and would not even wonder why a French wine would have an antelope on the label.

== Critical response ==
The story is often compared with Poe's essay on "Maelzel's Chess Player". American poet and author Daniel Hoffman says the story is an "interesting sort of failure" because it does not include the dim-witted narrator to offset the genius detective. The story is also considered lesser than Poe's previous detective stories because the amateur detective's obsession with exposing the murderer eliminates most of the mystery.

== Influence ==
"Thou Art the Man" is also the (sole) content of the telegram Pilot Pirx sends to the culprit in Stanisław Lem's short story "Ananke", trying to force him to confess.
