= Ananke (disambiguation) =

Ananke is a deity in Greek mythology. Ananke may also refer to:

- Ananke (moon), a moon of Jupiter
- Ananke group, a group of satellites of Jupiter that follow similar orbits to Ananke
- "Ananke", a short story by Stanisław Lem from Tales of Pirx the Pilot
- Cosmopterix ananke, a moth of family Cosmopterigidae
