= The Adventures of Pirx =

Hungarian television mini-series

The Adventures of Pirx (Hungarian: Pirx kalandjai) was a television mini-series in Hungary in 1973 based on the 1968 science fiction short story collection Tales of Pirx the Pilot by Polish writer Stanisław Lem. Released by Magyar Televízió, it was directed by István Kazan and András Rajnai. Pirx was played by János Papp. Five episodes were aired.

== Episodes ==
The space station described as "a green pot with three skimmers"

1. The diploma exam / A diplomavizsga
  The first part of the episode is inspired by the story The Test, with which it shares only the setup. Pirx takes a space flight exam, not without surprises, only to learn that the flight was a simulation. In the second part of the episode (loosely based on the story "The Albatross") Pirx and his buddies celebrate the graduation on a luxury spaceship, when the captain receives a distress signal from a spaceship with damaged reactor... Pirx saves them all.
2. The mystery of the Galileo station / A Galilei-állomás rejtélye
  Several mysterious tragic accidents happen at the Galileo station on the Moon.
3. Weekend on Mars / Víkend a Marson
  Loosely based on "The Hunt"
4. Terminus, the crown witness / Terminusz, a koronatanú
  Loosely based on "Terminus"
5. Action at 127:25 / Akció 127 óra 25-kor
  Based on "The Inquest"

While the "original" Pirx was shy and women are virtually absent from his tales, the Hungarian one had a love interest, a budding journalist, Glória, played by Szilvia Sunyovszky in all five episodes. They are in a permanent conflict, because the girl wants romance, while Pirx is busy solving problems.

== Reception ==
Bartosz Staszczyszyn of Culture.pl commented that of all adaptations of Lem, this one is the most comical; however not because the authors decided on a comical interpretation, but due to inept special effects. As Staszczyszyn put it: "The very first scene of the series leaves no doubt: a green pot with three skimmers attached pretends to be... a space station." A Hungarian reviewer Gábor Apats seconded the impression: "In 1972, the Hungarian sci-fi series The Adventures of Pirx was shown, from which most people probably only remember the household items used as scenery." ... "magnified lemon squeezers floating in space and clearly recognizable matchboxes parked in front of the Astronaut Academy." This is explained by an extremely low budget: the scenery was set up on a table top, which was combined with actors' play using the "blue screen" technology.
