= Polish Space Agency =

Polish state space agency

- Polska Agencja Kosmiczna (Polish)
- Logo

Agency overview
- Abbreviation: POLSA
- Formed: 26 September 2014; 12 years ago
- Type: Space agency
- Headquarters: Gdańsk, Poland
- Official language: Polish
- Administrator: Marta Ewa Wachowicz
- Owner: Poland
- Annual budget: PLN42.7 million (US$11.06 million) (2021)
- Website: polsa.gov.pl

The Polish Space Agency (POLSA; Polish: Polska Agencja Kosmiczna, PAK) is the space agency of Poland, administered by the Ministry of Economic Development and Technology. It is a member of the European Space Agency. The agency is focused on developing satellite networks and space technologies in Poland. It was established on 26 September 2014, and its headquarters are located in Gdańsk.

== History ==
=== Background ===
During the Cold War era, Poland's space activities were heavily influenced by its relationship with the Soviet Union and its membership in the Warsaw Pact. The Polish People's Republic participated in the Interkosmos programme, a Soviet initiative to include Eastern Bloc allies and other countries in space research and exploration. Through the Interkosmos programme, Polish scientists played key roles in developing satellite technology. The Space Research Centre of Polish Academy of Sciences was founded in 1976. One key milestone was the travel of General Mirosław Hermaszewski to the Soviet space station Salyut 6 in 1978, being the first Polish national to travel to space.

After the dissolution of the Soviet Union in 1991, Poland took steps towards developing an independent space sector, signing a co-operation agreement with the European Space Agency on the peaceful use of outer space in 1994, which was later expanded on in 2002. Joining the European Union in 2004 and becoming a co-operating state in 2007 led to Poland's increasing participation in ESA programmes, and in July 2012 the ESA Council agreed to Poland joining the European Space Agency. The country officially became the 20th member of the ESA in November of the same year.

The first Polish satellite, PW-Sat, was developed by students at the Warsaw University of Technology and launched in February 2012, with the goal of finding low-cost solutions for de-orbiting satellites. In the following years, the nanosatellites Lem (2013) and Heweliusz (2014) were put into orbit as part of the BRITE programme by the Space Research Centre of Polish Academy of Sciences.

=== POLSA ===
On September 26, 2014, an act was passed by the Sejm establishing the Polish Space Agency (POLSA) as a branch of the Ministry of Economic Development and Technology. It started operating with a full team at the end of 2015. In November 2014, professor Marek Banaszkiewicz, who previously served as director of the Space Research Center of the Polish Academy of Sciences, became the first President of the newly-formed agency albeit in an interim capacity. The vice-president for science became professor Marek Moszyński from the Faculty of Electronics, Telecommunications and Information Technology of the Gdańsk University of Technology, and the Vice-President for Defense - General Lech Majewski. POLSA participates in a number of international programmes, such as the ESA's Space Situational Awareness Programme, focused on monitoring space debris and other objects approaching Earth; and the ENTRUSTED project, focused on providing secure satellite communication for and between government agencies within EU member states.

Banaszkiewicz would be replaced by Grzegorz Brona on 28 March, 2018 an industry veteran for 30 years had previously worked for CERN and had been the CEO of Creotech Instruments, Poland's leading satellite manufacturer. Brona would suddenly resign on 3 April, 2019 without giving a reason why and declined to comment on his resignation to Polish media. He would be replaced by Michał Szaniawski in an interim capacity having previously been the vice-president of the Industrial Development Agency and an advisor to the Minister of Entrepreneurship and Technology. He would be replaced by Grzegorz Wrochna on 18 February, 2021, who had previously been Undersecretary of State in the Ministry of Science and Higher Education and a veteran of CERN and the National Centre for Nuclear Research.

Wrochna would be abruptly dismissed from his post as POLSA President on March 11, 2025, due to his mishandling of the Starlink 11-4 Falcon 9 booster spinning out of control over Poland and disintegrating into several large chunks on February 19. The day after the crash POLSA had issued a statement that they “constantly monitor and analyzes threats in outer space originating from artificial objects, including rockets” and claimed to have adequately warned the government about the uncontrolled re-entry, however, the Ministry of Development and Technology disputed this alleging "irregularities that occurred in the process of reporting by the Polish Space Agency" with Krzysztof Paszyk urgently summoning Wrocha for an explanation. Paszyk also claimed that POLSA's earlier statement that they adequately warned the government "did not reflect the assessment of the situation resulting from the reports sent by the Agency and could have misled the public." On February 28 POLSA issued a formal apology, stating that they sent the report to the wrong email at the Ministry of National Defence. Shortly after on March 2 POLSA's main servers where hacked in a cyberattack only being restored on March 5, just 6 days before Wrocha was dismissed.

It would take until April 29th for a new President to be named, Dr. Marta Ewa Wachowic, a PhD in space physics who had been instrumental in getting POLSA formed as an independent agency in 2014. Between 2015 and 2018, she led the Department of Strategy and International Cooperation at POLSA seeking to support Poland’s space sector in international economic cooperation. Upon her appointment, her boss Krzysztof Paszyk stated "True, Copernicus wasn’t a woman… but the new President of POLSA, the Polish Space Agency, is. And I’m incredibly proud of that."

== Crewed space program ==
=== Axiom 4 and Ignis ===
On August 9, 2023 POLSA signed a deal with Axiom Space to send a Polish astronaut to the International Space Station aboard Axiom Mission 4, with the candidate being Sławosz Uznański-Wiśniewski, then the only Polish member of the European Space Agency's Astronaut Corps. He would become the first Polish national in space since Mirosław Hermaszewski flight with Soyuz 30. Shortly after POLSA contributed €200 million to the ESA, an increase from their expected contribution of €132 million as POLSA announced they seek to control a 3% stake in the European space market by 2030.

On February 5, 2025, it was officially announced that Sławosz Uznański-Wiśniewski became a member of the Axiom 4 crew as part of the standalone mission Ignis, a joint venture between POLSA and the ESA. Polish Prime Minister Donald Tusk announced at the mission's unveiling that "Space is no longer just a realm of imagination. It is becoming a domain where Polish ambitions will also be present." Ingis included 13 Polish scientific experiments covering topics such as the effects of microgravity on the human immune system, the development of cosmic radiation sensors, and the stability of nanomaterials in space conditions.

Sławosz Uznański-Wiśniewski launched to space on 25 June 2025 aboard Crew Dragon Grace on their third launch attempt on June 25, 2025 at 06:31:53 UTC (2:31:52 a.m. EDT). After 18 days at the ISS, Grace undocked on July 14, 2025, 11:15 UTC, commencing a 22-hour return to Earth. The spacecraft splashed down in the Pacific Ocean off the coast of San Diego on July 15, 2025 at 09:31:36 UTC (2:31:41 am PDT).

=== Artemis 6 ===
On 30 September 2023, Wrochna announced that POLSA aims to send a crewed mission to the Moon by 2030, presumably on Artemis 6. He also announced that Poland will be developing native launch capabilities, as well as native satellites to help the Polish economy. From 19 to 21 June, 2023, POLSA hosted a conference of Artemis Accord signatories in Gdańsk where Poland was one of the two co-chairs of the "Emerging Space Actors Working Group" alongside Brazilian Space Agency.

== Domestic satellites ==
On March 6, 2018 the POLSA announced that they were planning on investing 1.43 billion zł over an eight-year period as part of the "National Space Program" project which would allow POLSA to coordinate with preexisting private space entities in Poland. The founding would have also funded an astronomical observation satellite, a SAR microsatellite, and a number of other R&D projects. Piotr Suszyński, the vice president for defense at POLSA, also stated that the project would promote international cooperation with the European Space Agency (ESA). However, POLSA's funding request would not pass.

On March 18, 2022, POLSA signed a letter of intent with Virgin Orbit in a bid to secure a domestic launch capability. POLSA planned on launching a series of microsatellites, however, the Russian invasion of Ukraine shuttered any plans to use Russian rockets to launch the probes. Wrochna also explained that Poland has no physical location for a traditional vertical launch pad, as any typical space launch will cause debris to fall on populated areas. Virgin's Orbit, and by extension LauncherOne, were defunct before a Polish flight could take place.

=== EagleEye ===
On March 2, 2023, POLSA's vice-president Michal Wiercinski attended Australian International Airshow in order to win not only a launch site for future Polish missions, likely the RAAF Woomera Range Complex, but also to win over subcontractors to design Polish satellites, namely the EagleEye Earth observation spacecraft. This comes as tensions flare between Poland, and NATO against Russia, and the CSTO, as Poland sees the development of Earth observation satellites as an issue of national security. EagleEye would be launched on the Transporter-11 Falcon 9 mission, being the first Polish Satellite developed by POLSA.

=== PIAST ===
The PIAST constellation are a group of three identical 6U Earth Observation nanosatellites announced in 2021 and developed by a consortium led by Creotech Instruments guided by the Military University of Technology and operated by POLSA. The project cost ~zł70 million, 40% of which was allocated to Creotech for the manufacturing and is expected to have a five-meter resolution. The satellites will be used for targeting for JASSM-ER missiles or ATACMS missiles. Additionally, they will also be used to coordinate troop movements and management of missions. The constellation was planned to be launched in the second half of 2024, however, that would be delayed to the first half of 2025, before ultimately being launched on 28 November, 2025.

=== Camilla ===
On October 31, 2023, POLSA announced a partnership with the ESA which would see a Polish satellite constellation launched by 2027. The constellation will consist of at least four satellites, three optoelectronic and one radar, and is expected to cost $87 million. The satellites will be designed and manufactured in conjunction with the ESA. The goal of the constellation is in the monitoring and management of land use, agriculture, the environment, infrastructure, water, and emergencies. These will be the first ever civilian Polish governmental satellites, with the constellation using the working name Camilla.

== International cooperation ==
=== China ===
On July 4, 2016, POLSA announced that they were signing a letter of cooperation with the Chinese National Space Administration to foster developments in science and technology in the two countries and promoting cooperation between Polish and Chinese technology developers. Additionally, the deal outlined Polish experiments being potentially launched on Chinese rockets, and potential Polish experiments to Tiangong-2. On September 16, 2016, POLSA announced that a joint Polish-Swiss payload POLAR, designed to study gamma radiation bursts, was launched to Tiangong-2 with "satisfactory results" and behavior "as expected." Tiangong-2 was never designed for permanent habitation and was de-orbited in 2019.

In 2021 when China announced their new Tiangong station one of its planned payloads would be a Polish National Centre for Nuclear Research follow-up experiment, POLAR-2, to be sent to the station by 2024. However, the other partner on POLAR, the University of Geneva, expressed doubts on if the project would ever actually be sent into orbit, citing difficulty sending electronics into China, as well as a general increase in geopolitical tensions between Europe and China. The payload is currently still scheduled to be launched, albeit delayed, to some time in 2027 as of November 20, 2025.

=== BlueBon ===
On November 1, TelePIX, a South Korean space startup announced they will be working with the Polish nanosatellite company SatRevolution, in conjunction with the South Korean Ministry of Science and ICT and POLSA, to develop a 6U CubeSat named BlueBon. Its main payload is a 3.8-meter optical camera to collect Earth observation data. BlueBon would launch on January 14 2025 onboard the Falcon 9 Transporter-12.

=== United States ===
On October 26, 2021, Poland became the 13th nation to join the Artemis Accords, collaborating with NASA to return men to the Moon by 2025 as part of the Artemis program. Grzegorz Wrochna, then-President of POLSA, stated that although joining the accord does not guarantee a Polish astronaut will go to the Moon, it will ensure greater cooperation with global aerospace efforts, and will ensure that "Polish equipment, Polish instruments will fly to the moon and to other bodies." As part of the Artemis program, Polish firm Vigo Photonics developed the infrared radiation detectors for the Orion Multi-Purpose Crew Vehicle, while the PAN Nuclear Physics Institute developed ionizing radiation detectors.

At the Space Symposium 38 in Colorado Springs on April 19, 2023, U.S. Army general James H. Dickinson signed a treaty with POLSA president Grzegorz Wrochna for Poland to join the Space Situational Awareness Programme.

== Management ==
- President: Marta Ewa Wachowicz (from 29 April 2025)
- Vice-President: Col. Marcin Mazur (since 22 November 2021)
- Vice-President: Michał Wierciński, PhD (since 25 February 2022)

== See also ==
- List of Polish satellites
- KP Labs: a private firm from Gliwice that created the Intuition-1 satellite
- HYPE: a nanosat created by students at the AGH University of Krakow
