= Hertz Systems =

Hertz Systems Ltd is a Polish company based in Zielona Gora that utilizes space technology for both the military and civilian markets, primarily relying on GPS navigation. Hertz Systems cooperates with, among others, the European Space Agency, the Polish Space Agency, the Space Research Center of Polish Academy of Sciences and NATO agencies. It is also a partner of the University of Zielona Góra and the University of Warmia and Mazury, with which it jointly implements an interdepartmental course of study in space engineering. The company is participating in the project to build the first Polish commercial satellite SAT-AIS-PL, commissioned by ESA.

== History ==
Hertz Systems was established in 1989, initially operating in the civilian area. Later the business was expanded to include the military market, enriching the company's offer with military equipment and satellite systems for the Polish Armed Forces and NATO allied forces. The year 2012 marked the beginning of the company's activities in the space sector. Two years later, the company launched the LMS animal transport monitoring system project under the ESA. In 2015. CEO of Hertz Systems was appointed to the Council of the Polish Space Agency.

== Activities ==
Hertz Systems operates in three areas: space, military and civilian.

In the space area, Hertz Systems is carrying out the LMS (Livestock Monitoring Systems) project in conjunction with the ESA, which allows monitoring the conditions under which animals are transported. The Zielona Góra-based company is also implementing the project of the Polish AIS observation satellite, and the first Polish commercial satellite SAT-AIS-PL.

In the area of defense industry, the company supplies military HGPST satellite navigation receivers with SAASM module, which are used on military combat platforms. The company also develops solutions for the civilian market – monitoring vehicle fleets, security systems, or personal localization.

Hertz Systems has designed and installed security systems for the chancellery of the President of the Republic of Poland, the Sejm building or the CBA.

HGPST GPS receivers are on military platforms and systems: KTO Rosomak, SOŁA radiolocation station, PILICA, LIWIEC counter-battery radar, GUNICA, Link 16 data transmission system and minehunter "Kormoran II".

Hertz Systems Ltd Sp. z o.o. also provides comprehensive security services for individuals and property. As one of the first security companies in Poland, it has introduced smart home services, i.e. a set of: home alarms, chad sensors, motion detectors combined with an external communication system provides comprehensive protection in all conditions. In addition, Hertz Systems offers a 2-year warranty period and systems (FAS) and (DSO).

== Awards ==
In 2013, Hertz Systems was awarded the title of Polish Business Leader, and a year later was awarded in the State Security Leader competition. The company also holds an MIA concession in the field of manufacturing and trading military and police technology, as well as a NATO SECRET and EU SECRET Industrial Security Certificate.
