= Aniel (disambiguation) =

Aniel is an angel in Jewish lore and angelology.

Aniel may also refer to:

- Pierre-Jean Aniel (1797-1865), French ballet master
- Aniel (Thorgal), the 26th issue of comic book series Thorgal
- Aniel, Israel, a moshav in Israel
- Aniel, a robot in the short story "The Accident" from Tales of Pirx the Pilot by Stanisław Lem (1973)
- Aniel, father of Talorc I, king of Picts
