= János Papp =

János Papp (born August 4, 1948) is a Hungarian film, TV film, stage, and voice actor. He is also known as an avid backpacker and author of several travelogues.

He is a longtime herald at the International Palace Games of Visegrád (the largest medieval festival in Hungary) and a member of the Order of Saint George.

== Selected filmography ==
- 1973: The Adventures of Pirx, as Pilot Pirx
- 2022 The Grandson, as uncle Gyuri
- 2023: Four Souls of Coyote, as Grandpa and Old Creator

== Awards ==
- 1980: Kazinczy Award
- 2012: Aase Award
- 2015: Hilda Gobbi Award for lifetime achievement
- 2022: Iván Verebély Award

== Travelogues ==
- 1987: National Blue Tour („Lábjegyzet” / “Footnote”)
- 2005: El Camino („Ha menni kell…” / “If you have to go…”)
- 2006: Lapland („Észak-fok, titok…” /“Northern Cape, secret…”)
- 2007: Japan-Alps („Japppános” / “Japanese”)
- 2008: National Blue Circle (2666,3 km, 86 nap / 2666.3 km, 86 days)
- 2009: Scotland („Aki dudás akar lenni…” / “Who wants to be a bagpiper…”)
- 2010: Himalayas („Valaki fölért”/ “Someone has reached the top”)
- 2011: Sierra Nevada - California („Nevess, nevess, én majdnem meghaltam!” / “Laugh, laugh, I almost died!”)
- 2012: Peru („Inka, inkább, leginkább” / “Inca, rather, mostly”)
- 2013: Ireland („600 km, 100 Guinness” / “600 km, 100 Guinness”)
