= Piotr Nowak (politician) =

Polish economist and politician

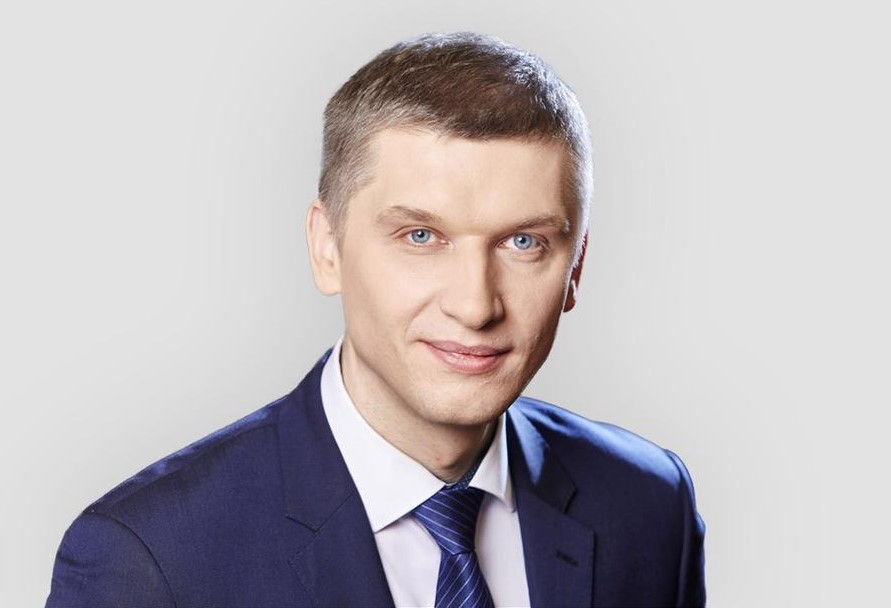
- Nowak in 2019

Minister of Development and Technology
- In office 26 October 2021 – 7 April 2022
- Prime Minister: Mateusz Morawiecki
- Preceded by: Position established
- Succeeded by: Waldemar Buda

Personal details
- Born: 30 April 1980 (age 46) Dobre Miasto, Polish People's Republic
- Party: Law and Justice
- Education: Military University of Technology; Warsaw School of Economics

Piotr Nowak (born 30 April 1980) is a Polish economist and politician. He was Minister of Development and Technology in the Second Cabinet of Mateusz Morawiecki until resigning in March 2022.
