= The Hunt (1950s Stanisław Lem short story) =

Short science fiction story by Stanisław Lem

The Hunt (Polish: Polowanie) is a long unknown science fiction short story by Stanisław Lem about a robot hunted by people. It superficially resembles another Lem's short story The Hunt from Tales of Pirx the Pilot; however, the two are completely different. It was written before the Pirx story, probably in late 1950s. It was found in Lem's archives and published in Przekrój magazine in 2018. An English translation was published in 2019.

== Plot ==
A runaway is chased by humans with dogs. As the story evolves, it becomes clear that it is a robot, an intelligent machine, one of many created by humans to be hunted. For this reason it was endowed with wit and strength and an ability to be afraid, so that it would run away and make a hunt interesting: "... a tangled plot full of surprises, a forest strategy, a duel of cunning, of tactics, including laying double trails, dodging, looping the scent back on itself, crossing white-water streams and aerial bridges formed by fallen trees".

A little girl helps him to hide, but eventually it turns out that her goal was to lay her hands on a gun and shoot the hunted robot herself.

== Discussion ==
The manuscript of the story was found by Lem's secretary Wojciech Zemek several decades before the publication, but misled by the resemblance of both the title and the plot to the Pirx story, he filed it together with the drafts for the Pirx story.

It is well known that Lem was ruthlessly burning his unpublished works, and the researchers were puzzled why Lem kept this one. Stanisław Bereś attempts to explain this as follows. Lem never wrote and seldom spoke about his life during World War II in Nazi-occupied Lwow. However one can decipher subtle hints about his experiences of that time in various Lem's works of fiction. Bereś points out an obvious parallel between the runaway's hopeless struggle for his life in The Hunt story and the experience of the Jews during the Holocaust, including Lem's own. Therefore, Bereś suggests that, because Lem felt that he was overexposing himself in the story, he set it aside and eventually wrote another, more entertaining version and possibly forgot about the older manuscript.

The two versions of The Hunt are very different. One is a story of Pirx chasing a damaged mining robot on the Moon struck by a meteorite and firing its laser at any detected motion. On the other hand, the rediscovered version is told from the point of view of the robot designed to be a prey, who is, "like a Roman gladiator, fighting the longest possible struggle for its miserable electronic life".

== See also ==
- Korzenie and Botched Detective Story, two other recovered Lem's works found in one file
