= EagleEye (satellite) =

Earth observation satellite

- Rendering of EagleEye
- Mission type: Earth observation
- Operator: Polish Space Agency
- COSPAR ID: 2024-149AS
- SATCAT no.: 60529
- Mission duration: 1 year

Spacecraft properties
- Spacecraft type: Satellite
- Manufacturer: Creotech
- Dry mass: 50 kilograms (110 lb)

Start of mission
- Launch date: 15 August 2024, 18:56:00 UTC
- Rocket: Falcon 9 Transporter-11
- Launch site: Vandenberg SCL-4
- Contractor: SpaceX

Orbital parameters
- Reference system: Geocentric
- Regime: VLEO
- Perigee altitude: 504.6 kilometres (313.5 mi)
- Apogee altitude: 510.7 kilometres (317.3 mi)
- Inclination: 97.433 degrees
- Period: 94.627 minutes
- Epoch: 28 Oct 2024, 15:39
- Mission patch

EagleEye is an Earth observation satellite in very low Earth orbit. It is the first satellite developed and operated by the Polish Space Agency (POLSA), as previous Polish satellites, PW-Sat (which was developed by WUT students), BRITE, and Intuition-1, were designed and operated by private firms.

== Development ==
Development of EagleEye began in April 2020 as a collaboration between a consortium of industrial and scientific organizations led by Creotech, with contributions from the Space Research Centre and Scanway. The basis for EagleEye was largely based on Creotech's HyperSat template, which began development in 2017 as a modular platform for small satellites.

The satellite was designed locally in Poland from the ground up, but some components, namely microprocessors, needed to be imported. A military satellite, most of it was developed and designed by the Space Research Centre as it transitioned into the Polish Space Agency, while Creotech assembled most of the parts.

On March 2, 2023, POLSA's vice-president Michal Wiercinski attended the Australian International Airshow to win over EagleEye subcontractors. The Polish government viewed the satellite's development as a priority due to Russia's invasion of Ukraine, as one of the main uses of the satellite would be observing troop movements. However, EagleEye will also have civilian uses to monitor agriculture.

At 50 kg, EagleEye is the largest and heaviest Polish satellite. Its resolution is one meter per pixel, and it can take images in both visible and infrared light. EagleEye successfully completed its qualification tests in April 2024.

== Mission ==
EagleEye was launched on board the SpaceX Falcon 9 Transporter-11 on August 15, 2024.

By August 17, Creotech reported that the first phase of the EagleEye mission was successful, having established communications and received all parameters for further operations.

However, by August 25, Creotech reported that they were failing to properly receive data from EagleEye. By September 3, Creotech reported that they had narrowed the issue down to either an improper orbit, or voltage regulators in the satellite's power supply shutting systems off to prevent surges as the solar panels were generating too much power.

== Impact ==
The first satellite domestically assembled by Polish firms and operated by POLSA, the EagleEye was described as a "breakthrough moment" for the Polish space industry, as Poland seeks to become a larger player in the European Space Agency in an effort to create more high-tech jobs. Additionally, it proved that Poland had crossed the main entry barrier for spaceflight, in the form of the highly complex engineering needed to make the satellite.

An improved version of the EagleEye, dubbed EagleEye 2.0, will be one of the four satellites in the Camilla constellation, an upcoming Earth Observation network commissioned by the Ministry of Economic Development and Technology expected to launch in Q4 of 2027.

== See also ==
- List of Polish satellites
- PIRX-1 another Polish military satellite with the same satellite body
