= András Rajnai =

Hungarian television director and screenwriter (1934–2004)

- Born: 7 July 1934; Budapest, Hungary
- Died: 28 January 2004 (aged 69); Budapest, Hungary
- Occupations: Television director, screenwriter

András Rajnai (7 July 1934 – 28 January 2004) was a Hungarian TV director and screenwriter who worked for Hungarian Television (Magyar Televízió Müvelödési Föszerkesztöség: MTV) between 1958 and 1996. He was born on 7 July 1934, in Budapest, Hungary, and died on 28 January 2004 (age 69), also in Budapest. He was known for his use of blue-screen special effects techniques which he applied to television adaptations of science fiction and fantasy stories, by authors such as Stanislaw Lem, Isaac Asimov, Alexei Tolstoy, Jonathan Swift, Dante Alighieri and others.

His director credits (according to IMDb, except where otherwise indicated), are

- 1994 Szent Gellért legendája (TV Movie) (also screenplay)
- 1991 A próbababák bálja (TV Movie)
- 1989 Szindbád nyolcadik utazása (TV Mini-Series)
- 1985 Gyémántpiramis (TV Movie)
- 1982 Régi idők sci-fije - Sci-fi of old times (TV Movie)
- 1980 Aelita (TV Movie) Based on Aelita by Alexei Tolstoy
- 1980 Szetna, a varázsló (TV Movie)
- 1980 Ollantay, az Andok vezére (TV Movie)
- 1980 A fejenincs Írástudó (TV Movie)
- 1980 Gulliver az óriások országában (TV Movie) Based on Gulliver's Travels by Jonathan Swift
- 1979 Szávitri, az asszonyi hüség dicsérete (TV Movie)
- 1978 Mesék az ezeregyéjszakáról (TV Movie)
- 1978 A táltosfiú és a világfa (TV Movie)
- 1978 Kalaf és Turandot története (TV Movie)
- 1976 A halhatatlanság halála (TV Movie) (also screenplay) Based on The End of Eternity by Isaac Asimov
- 1975 Gilgames (TV Movie) (also screenplay)
- 1974 Gulliver a törpék országában (TV Movie) (also screenplay) Based on Gulliver's Travels by Jonathan Swift
- 1974 Pokol - Inferno (TV Movie) Based on La Commedia Divina (The Divine Comedy) by Dante Alighieri
- 1973 Pirx kalandjai (TV Series) (also screenplay) Based on Tales of Pirx the Pilot by Stanislaw Lem
