= Zespoły Filmowe =

Film studio

Przedsiębiorstwo Realizacji Filmów "Zespoły Filmowe" (Polish: Film Production Company "Film Groups") was a Polish state-owned film studio founded in 1969 after the closure of the production company Zespoły Autorów Filmowych in the aftermath of the March 1968 events.

== Select filmography ==
- 1969 - How I Unleashed the Second World War (Jak rozpętałem drugą wojnę światową).
- 1969 - Hunting Flies (Polowanie na muchy).
- 1969-71 - Liberation (Wyzwolenie).
- 1974 - The Deluge (Potop).
- 1977 - Soldiers of Freedom (Sołdaty Swobody).
- 1978 - Test pilota Pirxa (The Test of Pilot Pirx)
- 1981 - Hands Up (Ręce do góry). (Its 1967 version was by pl:Zespół Filmowy Syrena)
- 1988 - A Short Film About Killing (Krótki film o zabijaniu).
