= Grzegorz Wrochna =

Polish physicist

Grzegorz Jacek Wrochna
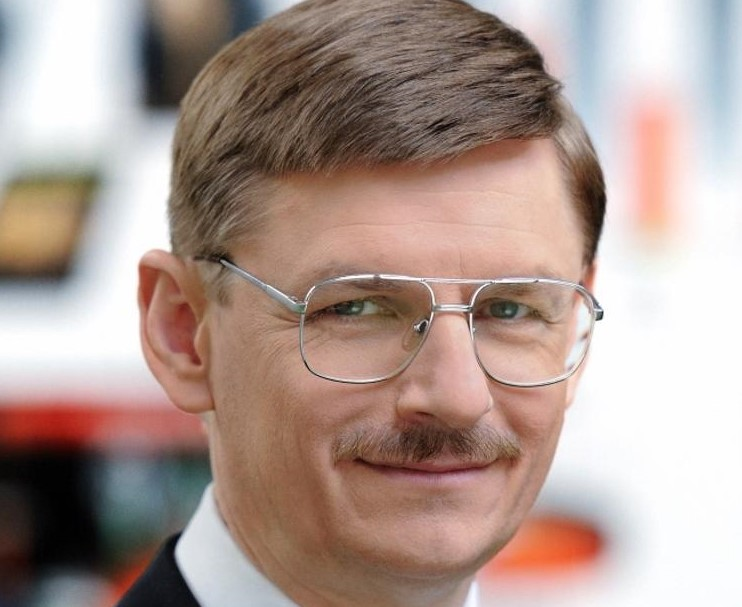

3rd President of the Polish Space Agency
- In office February 18, 2021 – March 11, 2025
- Preceded by: Michał Szaniawski
- Succeeded by: Marta Ewa Wachowic

Personal details
- Born: March 13, 1962 (age 64) Radom, Poland
- Education: University of Warsaw

Grzegorz Jacek Wrochna (born March 13, 1962, in Radom, Poland) is a Polish physicist who served as the President of the Polish Space Agency from 2021 to 2025. Before his nomination to this position, he was the director of the National Center for Nuclear Research from 2011 to 2015, and an under-secretary in the Ministry of Science and Higher Education from 2019 to 2021.

== Early life ==
Wrochna was born on March 13, 1962, in Radom. After graduating from the VI Jan Kochanowski High School, Wrochna studied physics at the University of Warsaw. In 1986, he began working as an assistant researcher in the Institute of Experimental Physics at the University of Warsaw. In 1991 Wrochna defended his doctoral dissertation, which was written under the supervision of Polish experimental physicist Andrzej Kajetan Wróblewski.

== Career ==
In the years 1991 to 1998 Wrochna worked at CERN in Geneva, Switzerland. He partook in a team searching for the Higgs Boson, which was ultimately discovered in 2012. In 1998 he received his habilitation at the University of Warsaw. From 1999 to 2006 was employed as a docent at the National Institute for Nuclear Research (IPJ) and he continued work on the Compact Muon Solenoid (CMS) detector. On October 30, 2006, he was designated as the new director of the IPJ. In 2009 Wrochna was appointed as a Professor of Physical Sciences and in October 2015 he oversaw the creation of the new facilities of the National Center for Nuclear Research in Świerk, Poland. On December 16, 2019, Prime Minister Mateusz Morawiecki nominated Professor Wrochna to serve as an under-secretary in the Ministry of Science and Higher Education. With the dissolution of the ministry on January 1, 2021, Wrochna left government service. On February 18, 2021, he was designated as the new President of the Polish Space Agency, succeeding Michał Szaniawski. In October 2021 Wrochna signed the Artemis Accords with NASA Deputy Administrator Pamela Melroy at the International Astronautical Congress in Dubai.

Wrochna would be abruptly dismissed from his post as POLSA President on March 11, 2025, due to his mishandling of the Starlink 11-4 Falcon 9 booster spinning out of control over Poland and disintegrating into several large chunks on February 19. The day after the crash POLSA had issued a statement that they “constantly monitor and analyzes threats in outer space originating from artificial objects, including rockets” and claimed to have adequately warned the government about the uncontrolled re-entry, however, the Ministry of Development and Technology disputed this alleging "irregularities that occurred in the process of reporting by the Polish Space Agency" with Krzysztof Paszyk urgently summoning Wrocha for an explanation. Paszyk also claimed that POLSA's earlier statement that they adequately warned the government "did not reflect the assessment of the situation resulting from the reports sent by the Agency and could have misled the public." On February 28 POLSA issued a formal apology, stating that they sent the report to the wrong email at the Ministry of National Defence. Shortly after on March 2, POLSA's main servers where hacked in a cyberattack only being restored on March 5, just 6 days before Wrocha was dismissed.

== Awards and honours ==
Wrochna was presented the SciVal Best Connectivity Award in November 2012 for effective collaboration with an international network of scientists. The award was presented by the Persyspektywy Educational Foundation and the publishing company Elsevier. In 2015 Wrochna received the Order of Polonia Restitutia for his contributions to the Polish scientific community and academic engagement in the field of nuclear physics. In 2018, he received the Ordre des Palmes académiques, which is presented to academics for exceptional scientific contributions. In November 2019, Wrochna received the Medal Stulecia Odzyskanej Niepodległości which was presented during Poland's Centennial Independence Day Anniversary.
