= Larry's Hideaway =

Music venue in Toronto, Ontario, Canada

- Interactive map of Larry's Hideaway
- Address: 121 Carlton Street
- Location: Toronto, Ontario, Canada
- Coordinates: 43.662686°N 79.375289°W

Construction
- Closed: 1986 (bar), 1988 (hotel)
- Demolished: 1993–1996?

Larry's Hideaway was a bar in the Prince Carlton Hotel in Toronto, Ontario, Canada. The venue was notable for being one of the first venues in Toronto to open itself to punk and new wave music acts, as well as hard rock. The venue was well known for its good acoustics. Several artists recorded live albums at the venue.

== Venue ==
The bar was located in the basement of the Prince Carlton Hotel on the north-west corner of Allan Gardens, on Carlton Street at Jarvis Street. The room was a restaurant prior to 1961, when it became a jazz venue.

Starting in the late 1970s, the venue was booked by the "Two Garys", Gary Topp and Gary Cormier, who also booked bands to "The Edge" venue and to the Horseshoe Tavern. The bar had a dirty, un-clean reputation although bands reputedly loved to play there.

The bar closed in the summer of 1986, but the hotel remained open and was the site of several robberies and sexual assaults. In September 1986, the hotel was raided by the Toronto Police. The police arrested 26 persons and seized thousands of dollars of stolen goods and drugs. The hotel was sold in 1988 and closed. It was boarded up and left vacant, sometimes used by squatters and vagrants. On October 16, 1991, a three-alarm fire destroyed much of the hotel. The City of Toronto government bought it in 1990 to increase the size of Allan Gardens park. The location is now the off-leash dog area of the park.

== Notable artists ==
- Lee Aaron
- Alien Sex Fiend
- Bauhaus
- Billy Bragg
- Blibber and the Rat Crushers
- Black Flag
- Circle Jerks
- John Cale
- Nick Cave and the Bad Seeds
- Chris and Cosey
- Ornette Coleman
- Conditioned Response
- The Cramps
- The Cult
- Dead Beat
- Howard Devoto
- The Diodes
- Einstürzende Neubauten
- The Exploited
- The Fall
- FM
- Goddo
- Hanoi Rocks - First North American performance March 1984
- Nina Hagen
- The Hi-Fi's (early Blue Rodeo)
- HYPE
- Killing Joke
- L'Etranger
- Linton Kwesi Johnson
- The Lords of the New Church
- Max Webster
- Negative Gain
- R.E.M.
- Random Killing
- Raving Mojos
- Rush
- Slayer
- Sun Ra Arkestra
- Teenage Head
- The Jolly Tambourine Man
- The Tragically Hip
- Triumph
- U.K. Subs
- Vital Sines

== Live albums ==
- Killing Joke - Ha!
- R.E.M. - Murmur (Deluxe Edition bonus disc)
- The Viletones - Saturday Night/Sunday Morning
- Discharge - Toronto '83
- HYPE - Live at Larry's Hideaway 1985 (album)
- Bauhaus - In a Glass Haus (2010 unofficial release of 1982 performance)
