= Fiasco (novel) =

1986 novel by Stanislaw Lem

- First published edition (Germany)
- Author: Stanisław Lem
- Original title: Fiasko
- Translator: Michael Kandel
- Language: German (First published)
- Genre: Science fiction
- Publisher: Fischer Verlag (Germany); Harcourt Brace Jovanovich (Eng. trans.)
- Publication date: 1986
- Publication place: Germany (first published)
- English publication date: May 1987
- Media type: Print (Hardback & Paperback)
- Pages: 336
- ISBN: 0-15-630630-1
- OCLC: 17896549

Fiasco (Polish: Fiasko) is a science fiction novel by Polish author Stanisław Lem, first published in a German translation in 1986. The book, published in Poland the following year and translated into English by Michael Kandel in the same year, is a further elaboration of Lem's skepticism: in Lem's opinion, the difficulty in communication with extraterrestrial intelligence (the main theme of the novel) is more likely cultural disparity rather than spatial distance. It was nominated for the Arthur C. Clarke Award.

The novel was written on order from publisher S. Fischer Verlag around the time Lem was emigrating from Poland due to the introduction of martial law. Lem stated that this was the only occasion he wrote something upon publisher's request, accepting an advance for a nonexistent novel.

== Plot summary ==
At a base on Saturn's moon Titan, a young spaceship pilot Parvis sets out in a strider (a mecha-like machine) to find several missing people, among them Pirx (the spaceman appearing in Lem's Tales of Pirx the Pilot). Parvis ventures to the dangerous geyser region, where the others were lost. Unfortunately, he suffers an accident. Seeing no way to get out of the machine and return to safety, he triggers a built-in cryogenic device.

An expedition is sent to a distant star in order to make first contact with a civilization that may have been detected. It is set more than a century after the prologue, when a starship is built in Titan's orbit. This future society is described as globally unified and peaceful with high regard for success. During starship preparations, the geyser region is cleared, and the frozen bodies are discovered. They are exhumed and taken aboard, to be awakened, if possible, during the voyage. However, only one of them can be revived (or more precisely, pieced together from the organs of several of them) with a high likelihood of success. The identity of the man is unclear; it has been narrowed to two men (whose last names begin with 'P'). It is never officially revealed whether he is in fact Pirx or Parvis, though it is heavily implied to be the latter. Due to his resurrection, he suffers from a common side effect of amnesia, unable to remember who he is. In his new life, he adopts the name Mark Tempe and works to recall his memories by re-educating himself using the ship's computer system.

The explorer spaceship Eurydika (Eurydice) first travels to a black hole near the Beta Harpiae to perform maneuvers to minimize the effects of time dilation. Before closing on the event horizon, the Eurydice launches the Hermes, a smaller explorer ship, which continues to Beta Harpiae.

Approaching the planet Quinta, which exhibits signs of harboring intelligent life, the crew of the Hermes attempts to establish contact with the denizens of the planet, who, contrary to the expectations of the mission's crewmen, are strangely unwilling to communicate. The crew reaches the conclusion that there is a Cold War-like state on the planet's surface and throughout the planetary system, halting the locals' industrial development.

The crew of the Hermes assumes that the Quintan civilisation is inevitably doomed to collapse in mutual assured destruction. They try to force the aliens to engage contact by means of an event impossible to hide by the aliens' governments: staging the implosion of their moon. Surprisingly, just before impact, several of the deployed rockets are destroyed by missiles of the Quintans, undermining the symmetry of the implosion which causes fragments of the moon to be thrown clear, some impacting the planet's surface.

However, even this cataclysm does not drive the locals to engage with their alien visitors, so the crewmen deploy a device working as a giant lens or laser, capable of displaying images (but also concentrating beams to the point of being a powerful weapon). Following a suggestion by Tempe, they show the Quintans a "fairy tale" by projecting a cartoon onto Quinta's clouds. At last, the Quintans contact the Hermes and make arrangements for a meeting. The humans do not trust the Quintans, so to gauge the Quintans' intentions, they send a smaller replica of the Hermes which is destroyed shortly before landing. The humans retaliate by firing their laser on the ice ring around the planet, shattering it and sending chunks falling on the planet.

Finally, the Quintans are forced to receive an 'ambassador', who is Tempe; the Quintans are warned that the projecting device will be used to destroy the planet if the man should fail to report back his continued safety. After landing, Tempe discovers that there is no trace of anyone at the landing site. After investigating a peculiar structure nearby, he finds a strange-looking mound, which he opens with a small shovel. To his horror, he notices that in his distracted state he has allowed the allotted time to expire without signaling his crewmates. As the planet is engulfed by fiery destruction at the hands of those who were sent to establish contact with its denizens, Tempe finally realizes what the Quintans are. However, he has no time to share his discovery with the others.

== Interpretation ==
The book is the fifth in Lem's series of pessimistic first contact scenarios, after Eden, Solaris, The Invincible, and His Master's Voice.

According to critic Paul Delany:

Fiasco will come to be regarded as one of the great SF novels... It is a remarkable achievement, even for Lem; for us, it is a most moving experience.
