= Iván Verebély =

Hungarian actor and comedian (1937–2020)

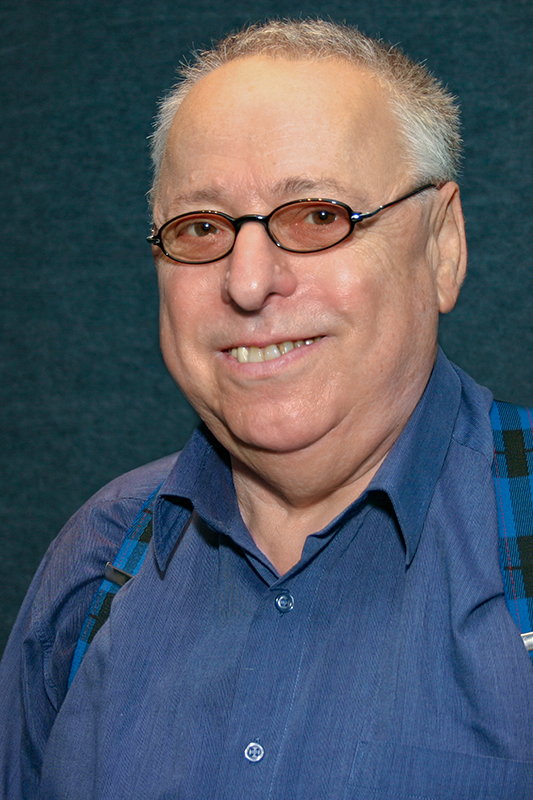

Iván Verebély (Iván Weinberg, 7 December 1937 in Budapest, Hungary – 23 September 2020 in Budapest, Hungary) was a Hungarian actor and comedian. He played in Miskolci Nemzeti Színház, Nemzeti Színház, and in Vidámszínpad.

He appeared in the 2008 film The Boy in the Striped Pyjamas and did voiceover work for Cat City 2. He gave the voice to Mayor Manx for the Hungarian dub of SWAT Kats: The Radical Squadron.

== Awards ==
- 1972: Jászai Mari Award
- 2008: Order of the Hungarian Republic Knight Cross (Magyar Köztársasági Érdemrend lovagkeresztje)

== Iván Verebély Award ==
In 2022, the Iván Verebély Award was established in his memory, awarded to the best episode actor of the given calendar year on a day around Verebély's birthday. The first recipient was János Papp.
