= PIRX-1 =

Earth observation satellite

- Rendering of PIRX-1
- Names: MIKROGLOB-1
- Mission type: Earth observation
- Operator: Polish Ministry of National Defense
- COSPAR ID: 2026-156AC
- Mission duration: 1 year

Spacecraft properties
- Spacecraft type: Satellite
- Manufacturer: Creotech
- Dry mass: 55 kilograms (121 lb)

Start of mission
- Launch date: 7 July 2026, 7:12 UTC
- Rocket: Falcon 9 Transporter-17
- Launch site: Vandenberg SCL-4
- Contractor: SpaceX

Orbital parameters
- Reference system: Heliosynchronous

PIRX-1 is an earth observation satellite commissioned and operated by the Polish Ministry of National Defense and manufactured by Creotech as part of the MikroGLOB program. Its primary payload is optoelectronic observation equipment.

== Background ==
The MicroGLOB program is 4 optoelectronic satellites run in conjunction with the MicroSAR program, 6 synthetic aperture radar satellites commissioned by the Ministry of National Defense and manufactured by the Finnish company Iceye. PIRX-1 is the first satellite in the MikroGLOB program to be constructed. The other three are expected to launch before the end of 2026. The satellite is based off the same platform as the EagleEye that was launched in August 2024. PIRX-1 is named after Pilot Pirx, a character from a series of science fiction short stories written by Stanisław Lem that were also adapted into a TV show and film.

== History ==
On 20 December 2024, the Ministry of National Defense announced the MikroGLOB program, a series of 4 satellites to be manufactured by Creotech that will be equipped with optical instruments for both near-infrared and visible light spectrum and on-board image processing capabilities.

PIRX-1 was launch on the SpaceX Transporter-17 mission on 7 July 2026 at 7:12 UTC. Colonel Grzegorz Matyja, commander of the Center for Satellite Operations and deputy commander of the Geospatial Reconnaissance and Satellite Services Agency, announced the satellite's successful deployment on 9 July 2026. It was deployed to a heliosynchronous orbit.

== See also ==
- List of Polish satellites
