= Allan Gardens =

Public park and conservatory in Toronto, Ontario, Canada

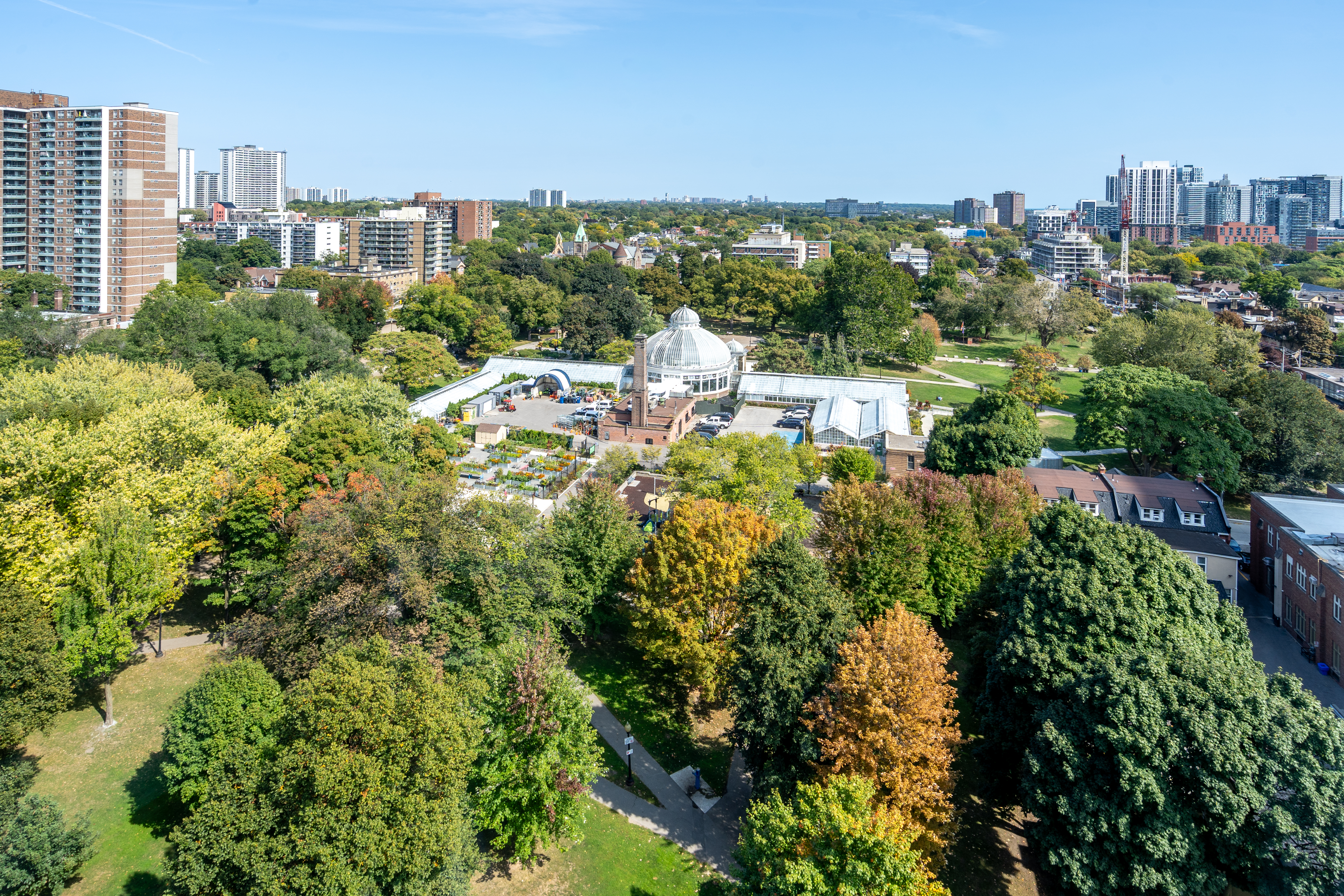
- Aerial view of Allan Gardens from Jarvis Street

- Location within Toronto
- Type: Public park
- Location: 160 Gerrard Street East, Toronto, Ontario, Canada
- Coordinates: 43°39′42″N 79°22′28″W
- Opened: 11 September 1860; 166 years ago
- Etymology: George William Allan
- Owner: Municipal government of Toronto
- Manager: Toronto Parks, Forestry and Recreation Division
- Status: Open all year
- Public transit: College; 506 75
- Website: toronto.ca/parks

Ontario Heritage Act
- Type: Part IV
- Designated: Jul 14, 1986

Allan Gardens is a public park and conservatory located in the Garden District of Toronto, Ontario, Canada. The property includes a playground, off-leash dog park, and a 1,500-square-metre (16,000 sq ft) conservatory with six greenhouses.

The park originated from lands donated to the Toronto Horticultural Society by George William Allan in 1858, with the horticultural society officially opening a gardens there in 1860. In 1864, the municipal government of Toronto acquired the lands surrounding the gardens, although it allowed the horticultural society to maintain it in return for permitting its public use. The conservatory was later acquired by the municipal government in 1888. The park and the gardens were initially known as the Horticultural Gardens until 1901 when it was renamed after Allan. A fire ravaged and destroyed a three-storey pavilion at the park in 1902. However, a new conservatory building, the Palm House was later completed on the property in 1910. The park has become a popular gathering place for protest since the mid-20th century.

== History ==
The property initially formed a part of Park Lot V, one of a series of properties that were subdivided by the authorities after the Toronto Purchase in the 1790s. In 1819, William Allan acquired the property, and he later built his Moss Park estate there. His son George William Allan, who served as the 11th mayor of Toronto and as president of the Toronto Horticultural Society, inherited the estate after William Allan's death in 1853. In 1855, Allan subdivided the land, although he retained a private garden north of Gerrard Street.

In 1858, shortly after Allan's tenure as mayor had ended, he gifted the horticultural society 2.0 hectares (5 acres) of land for them to develop a garden, although this transaction was not finalized until 1861. The Horticultural Gardens were opened to the public on 11 September 1860, with the Prince of Wales (later Edward VII) planting a maple tree in front of the pavilion. Alongside Queen's Park, which was also opened earlier that day, the two parks are the oldest parks in Toronto.

In 1864, the property surrounding the gardens and conservatory was acquired by the municipal government of Toronto for CA$11,500 (equivalent to $229,054 in 2025), to be used as a municipal park. The city provided a lease to the horticultural society, where the society agreed to maintain the grounds on the condition that they be publicly accessible and free of charge until 8 p.m.; after that time, the horticultural society was free to use the property to host charged-private events.

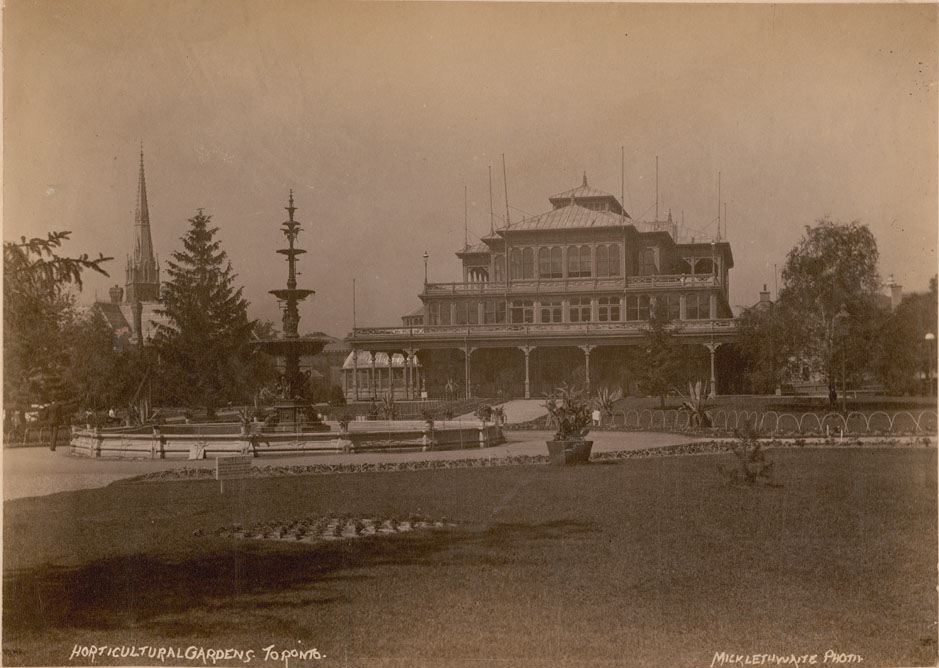
The Horticulture Pavilion at Allan Gardens in March 1891

The original rustic wooden structures were replaced in 1879 with a new three-storey pavilion to be used for concerts, gala balls, conventions, and flower shows. Construction of the new pavilion was financed through a C$20,000 mortgage taken out from the horticultural society. Because the horticultural society was unable to cover its debts, the conservatory was later sold to the municipal government in 1888. In the following year, iron fencing and gates were added to the park.

In 1893, the National Council of Women of Canada was established inside the Horticultural Pavilion of the gardens. In 1894, the garden's original conservatory was replaced. Shortly after the death of Allan in 1901, the gardens were renamed from the Horticultural Gardens to Allan Gardens in his honour. The pavilion was eventually destroyed in a fire on 6 June 1902. Shortly after the fire, a statue of Robert Burns was installed at the park on 19 July.

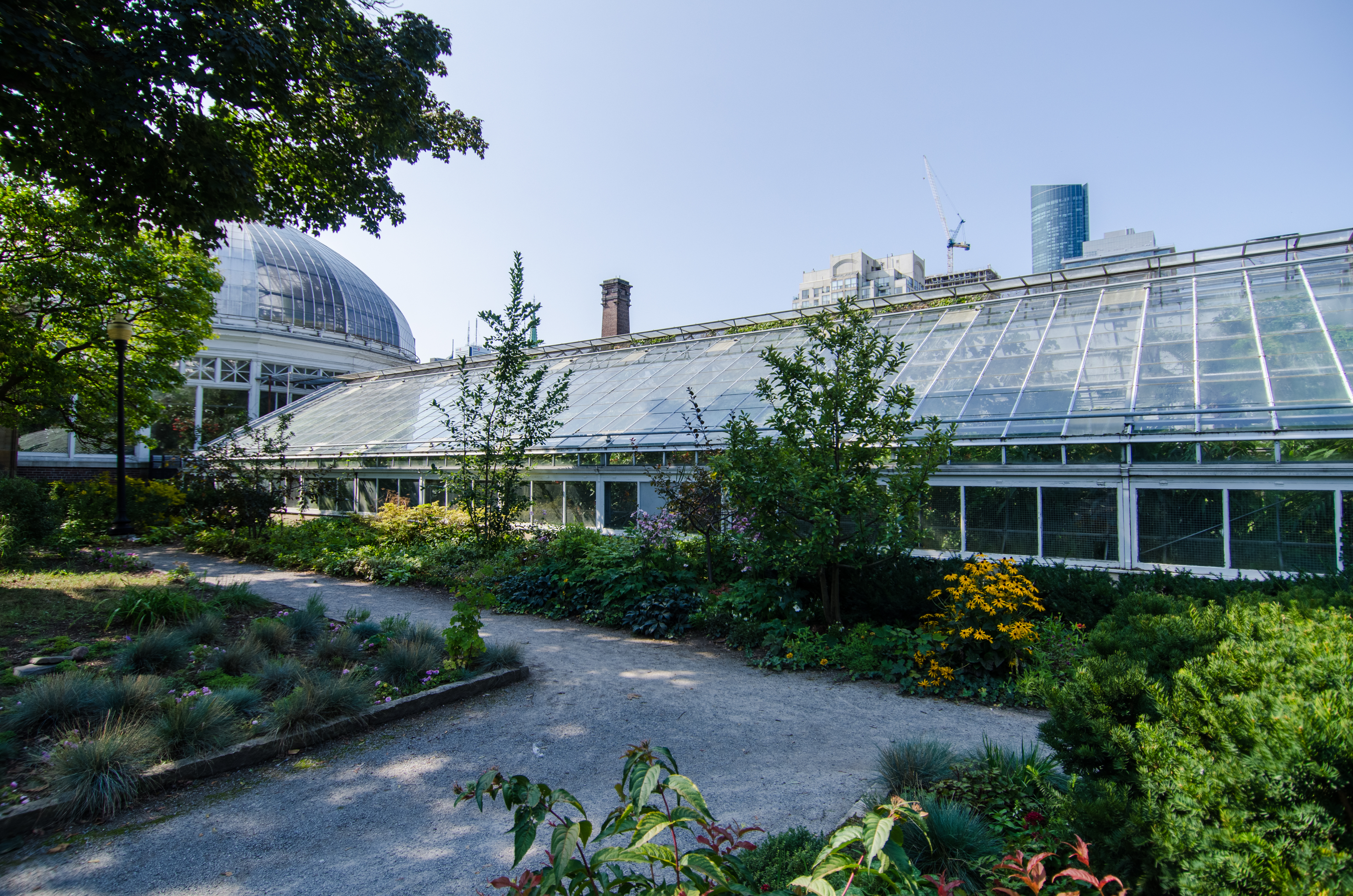
Extensions of the Palm House, built during the 1920s and 1950s

A structure to replace the pavilion was commissioned by the municipal government at a cost of C$50,000, after two more expensive proposals were shot down by the government. The new glass and iron-domed conservatory, the Palm House, was completed in 1910. In the 1920s, two more greenhouses were added to the conservatory. An additional wing, which included three greenhouses, was built in 1956 and 1957 in order to expand the garden's exhibition space. During the 1950s expansion, the garden was also expanded, its fencing and gates were removed, and its fountain replaced. During the 1960s, the property was enlarged, with the lands vacated by Jarvis Collegiate Institute absorbed by the park. The park was expanded again in 1990 after the city expropriated the Larry's Hideaway hotel along Carlton Street.

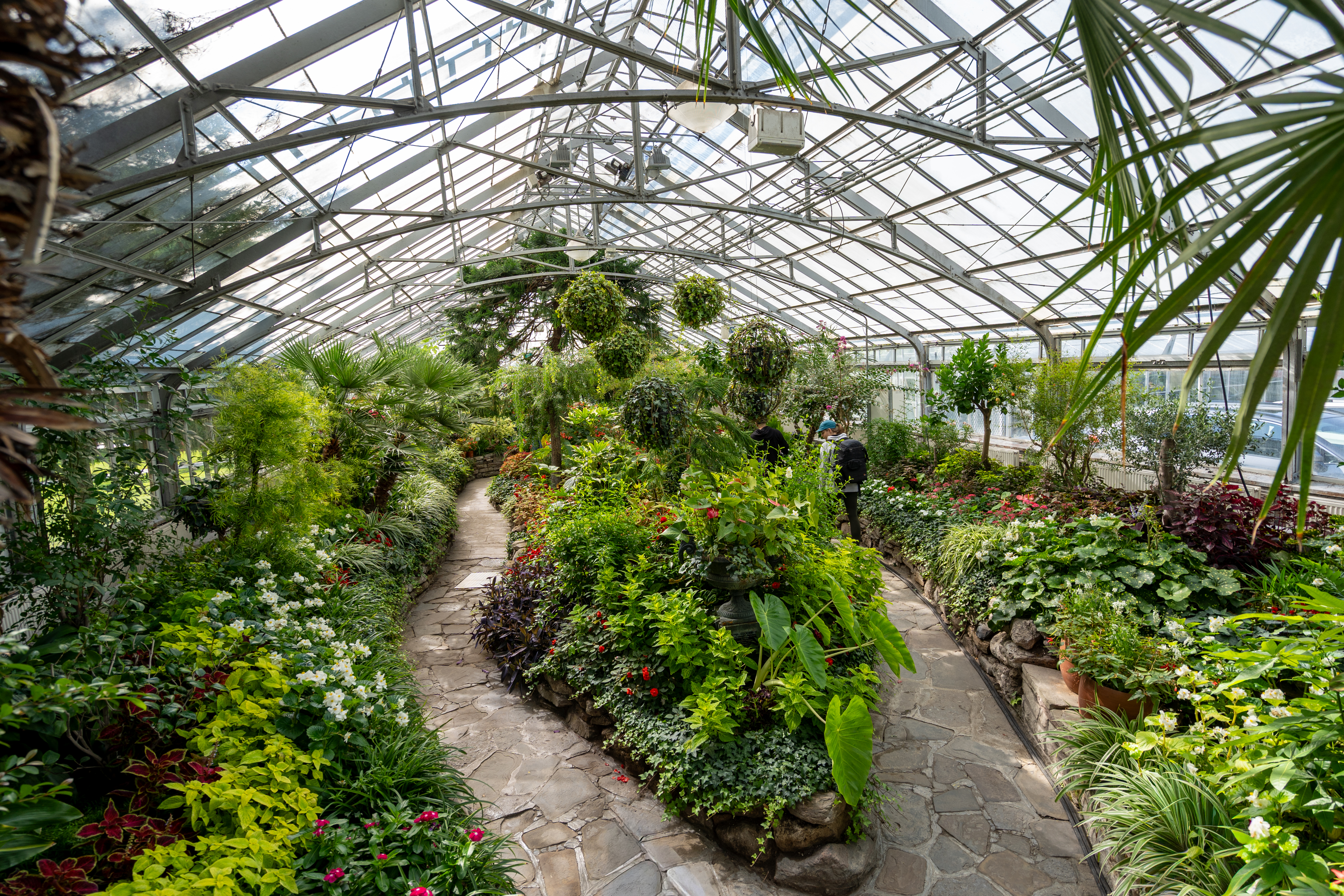
The temperate greenhouse, south of the Palm House

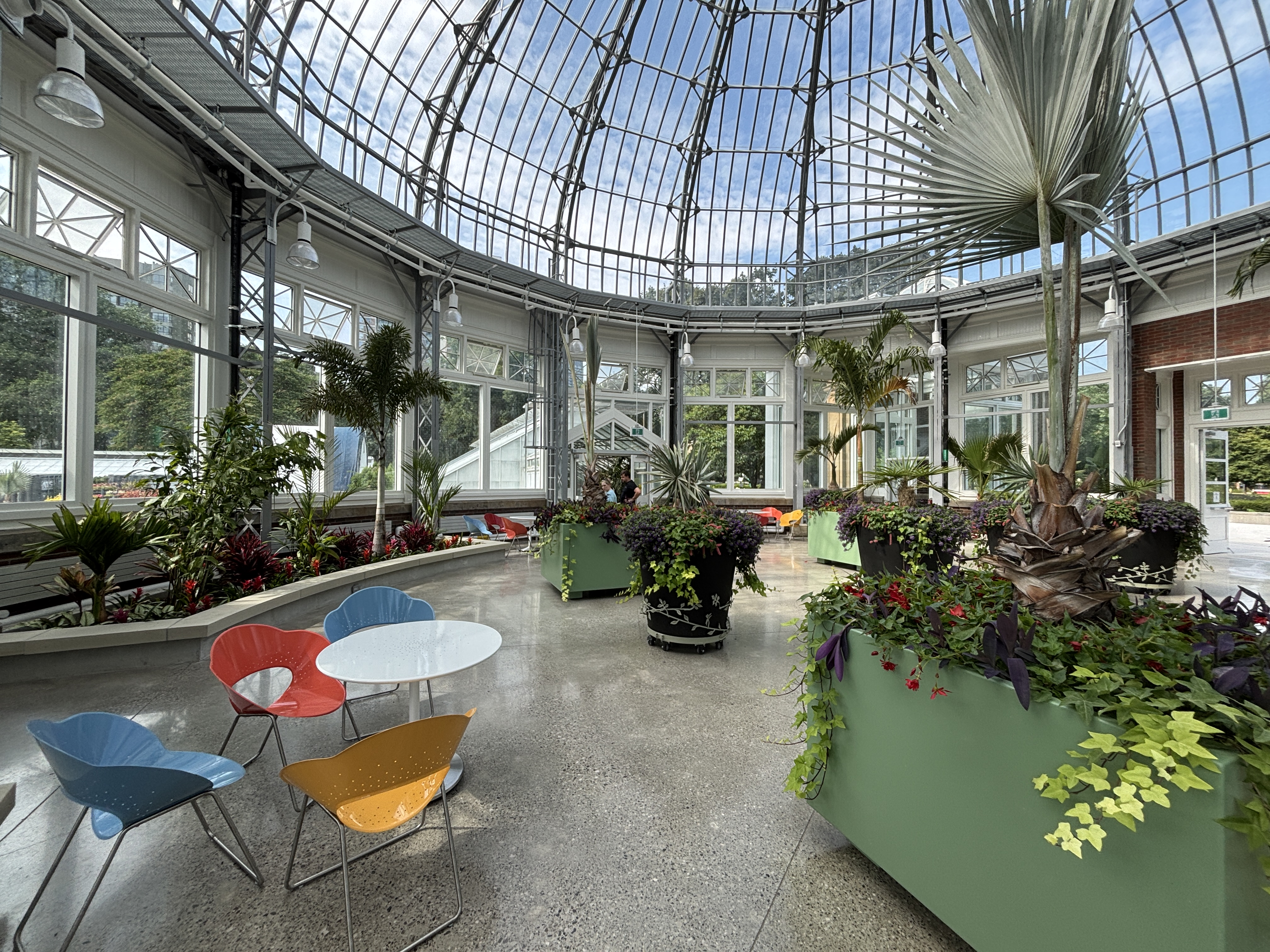
Palm House interior after revitalizations in May 2025

The park emerged as a popular gathering ground for protest during the mid-20th century, with the Workers' Ex-Servicemen's League first staging a protest at the park on 16 August 1933, in order to protest the treatment of veterans from the First World War during the Great Depression. Attempts were made by the Toronto Police Service to disperse the 1,000 person crowd, citing a by-law that restricted public protests to three designated public parks in the city. The by-law was later revised to include all parks after anti-war poets held "unauthorized readings" at the park during the 1960s. After rumours that a Nazi rally would take place at the park, an anti-Nazi crowd formed at the park on 31 May 1965, and eight individuals were beaten by a crowd after they were mistaken for neo-Nazis.

In 2003, the University of Toronto and Toronto-Dominion Bank financed the construction of a sixth greenhouse for the conservatory, named the Children's Horticultural Conservatory. The greenhouse was built by the university in order to house specimens held at the university's old greenhouse on College Street (relocated to Allan Gardens since the site was needed for the Leslie Dan Faculty of Pharmacy Building). The park was also among several municipal parks occupied by protesters during the 2010 G20 Toronto summit protests.

== Grounds ==
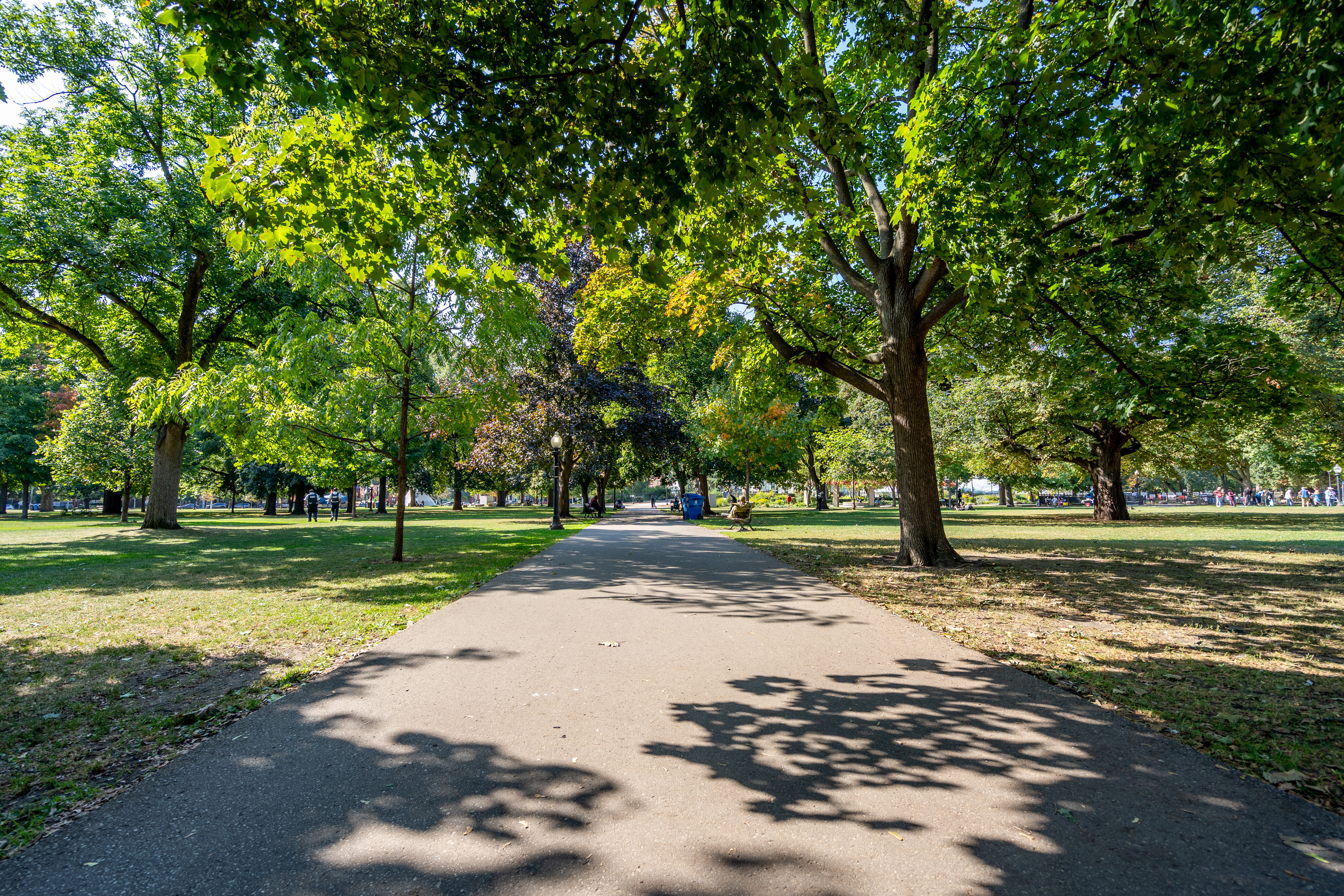
Pathway from the northeast corner of the park to the conservatory

Allan Gardens is a municipal park and conservatory maintained by the Toronto Parks, Forestry and Recreation Division. It is supported by the Friends of Allan Gardens, a volunteer organization that assists with advocacy and programming.

The park occupies roughly one city block and is bounded by Carlton Street to the north, Sherbourne Street to the east, Gerrard Street to the south, and Jarvis Street to the west. Jarvis Street Baptist Church is located to the southwest, and Grace Toronto Church is situated to the northwest.

Allan Gardens includes the conservatory, an off-leash dog park, and a children’s playground. A network of pathways crosses the park, including a north–south route linking Carlton and Gerrard streets, and an east–west route connecting the conservatory with the Robert Burns Monument and Sherbourne Street.

A 2008 assessment recorded 309 trees within the park, representing approximately 47 species. In recognition of its historical significance, Allan Gardens was listed on the City of Toronto Heritage Property Inventory in June 1973.

=== Conservatory ===
Allan Gardens Conservatory
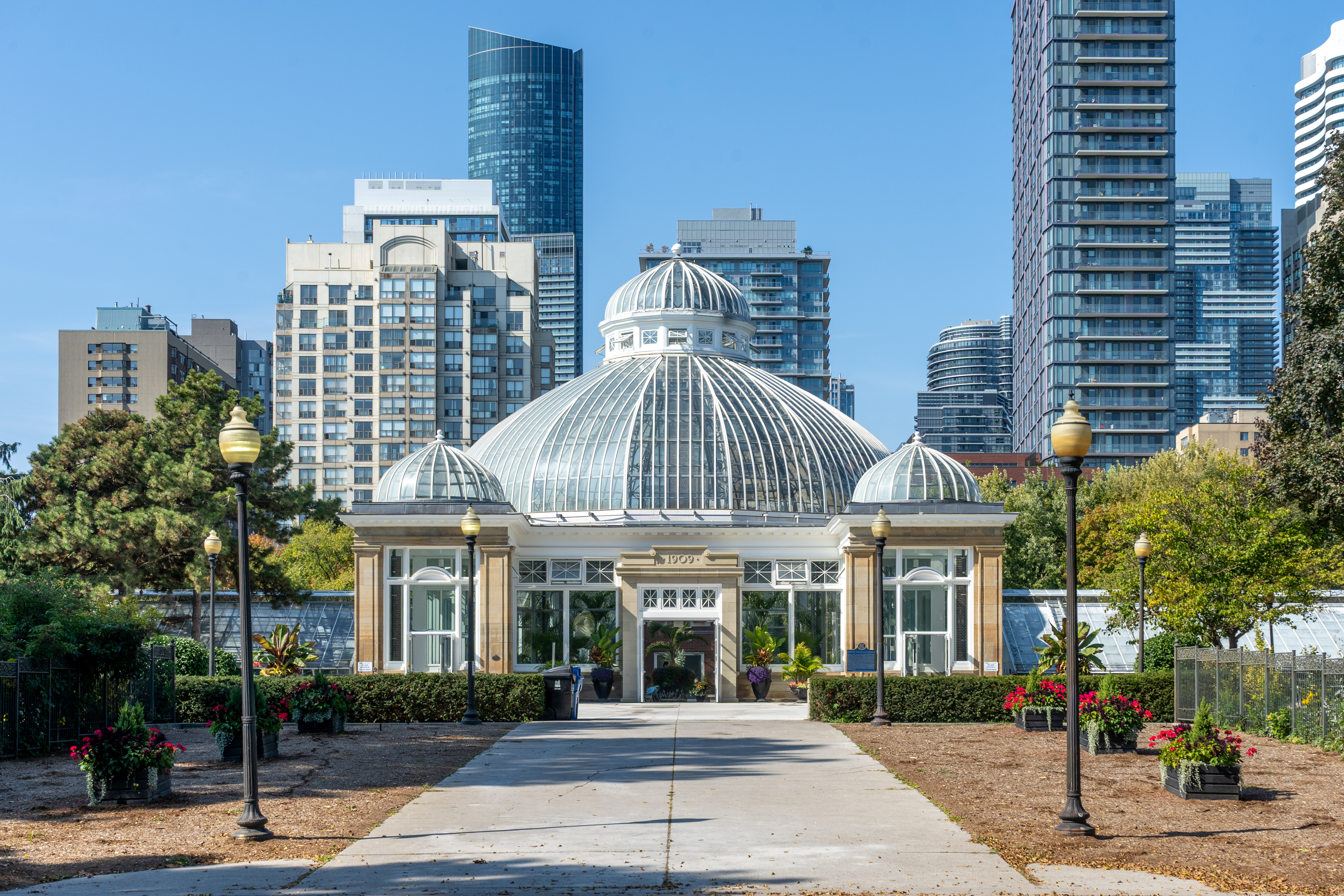
- Interactive map of Allan Gardens Conservatory
- Type: Conservatory
- Location: 19 Horticultural Ave, Toronto, ON M5A 2P2
- Owner: Municipal government of Toronto
- Operator: Toronto Parks, Forestry and Recreation Division, Friends of Allan Gardens
- Status: Open all year
- Website: toronto.ca/parks

The conservatory was initially built in 1909 by Robert McCallum in a neo-Classical and Edwardian style. The building features a brick-clad base with sandstone detailing, with stone, wood, glass, and iron also being used as building material for the structure. The building features a 16-sided glass and steel dome topped and a cupola topped with a finial; although the steel was later replaced with aluminum. The Palm House also includes a boiler room and chimney.

The original domed conservatory was expanded several times during the 1920s, and in 1956 and 1957, with the addition of five new greenhouse. In 2004, a sixth greenhouse was opened at the conservatory. In total, the conservatory's six greenhouses cover approximately 1,500 square metres (16,000 sq ft). Two greenhouses are used to house begonia, bromeliads, gesneriads, and orchids. Other greenhouses in the conservatory include a cool temperate greenhouse that houses camellias and plants from Australia and the Mediterranean; a palm greenhouse for a number of palm and tropical vines; the tropical landscape greenhouse for plants like cycads, hibiscus; and the arid house for cacti and succulents.

In addition to the Palm House, and the greenhouses, the conservatory also includes an administrative building erected in 1923. A central oval with a drinking fountain that commemorates Graeme Mercer Adam was originally situated east of the Palm House; although this was later replaced with a pergola in 1995.

== See also ==
- List of parks in Toronto
