= Korzenie =

Korzenie. Drrama wieloaktowe (Korzenie. Drrama in Several Acts) is a satirical play on the subject of Stalinism by Polish writer Stanisław Lem. Lem wrote it in late 1940s for his close circle of friends and relatives, hid it in his house and never found it. It was found only in early 2000s during the preparation of Lem's Opera Omnia by Gazeta Wyborcza, and published in vol. 16. Some memoirs indicate that it was framed as a puppet show and co-authored with artist Roman Husarski (the two also co-authored the satirical play "Yacht Paradise").

The word korzenie in the title is a pun. One meaning is "roots". The intended meaning alludes to the expression ukorzyć sie przed zachodem, which corresponds to the cliche used in the Soviet Union "идолопоклонничество перед западом", "idolatry of the West", "bowing before the West", and which was an element of the plot.

In an interview with Tomasz Fiałkowski Lem recalled that he had even taped the play, but the tape had deteriorated. The play turned out to be hidden in a file which contained another unpublished manuscript, Botched Detective Story, also published in vol. 16 of Lem's Opera Omnia.

The characters of the play had the "Soviet-sounding" names, easily decipherable by the contemporaries, such as the NKVDist with Georgian-language-sounding name Anichwili Tegonieradzę (cf. the patronymic suffixes -shvili and -dze), where "Ani chwili tego nie radzę" means "I would not advise it even for an instant" in Polish. And of course, there is Joseph Stalin, "superhumanly brilliant and inhumanly smiling" ("nadludzko genialny i nieludzko uśmiechnięty").

== See also ==
- The Hunt, a 2018 find of yet another lost Lem's work
- Antiformalist Rayok, a private contemporary anti-Stalinist musical satire, by Dmitri Shostakovich
