= Krzysztof Hetman =

Polish politician (born 1974)

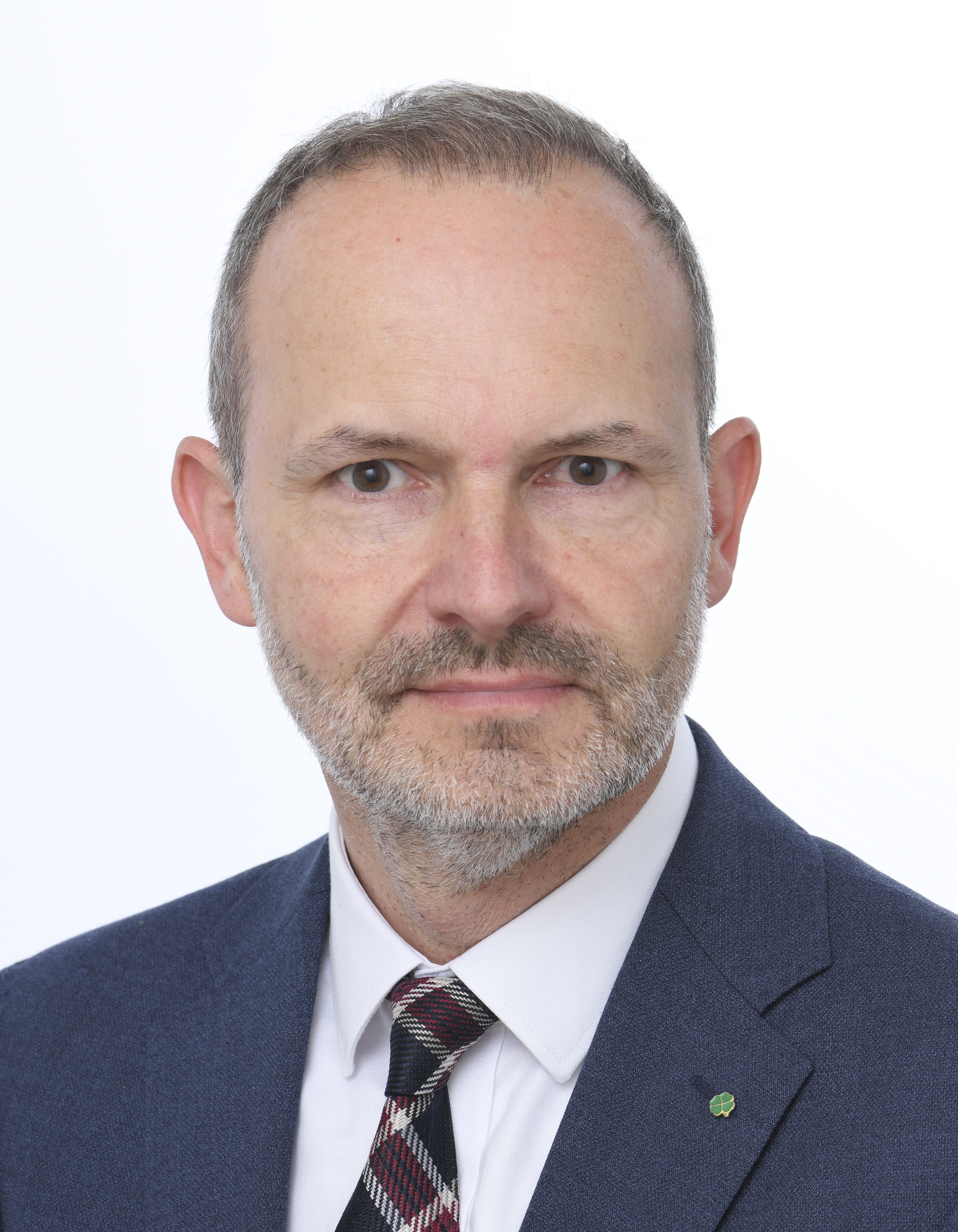

Minister of Development and Technology
- In office 13 December 2023 – 13 May 2024
- Prime Minister: Donald Tusk
- Preceded by: Marlena Maląg
- Succeeded by: Krzysztof Paszyk

Member of the European Parliament
- In office 1 July 2014 – 18 October 2023
- Constituency: Lublin

Member of the Sejm
- In office 13 November 2023 – 10 June 2024

Personal details
- Born: 27 June 1974 (age 51) Lublin, Poland
- Party: Polish People's Party (2002–present)
- Website: http://krzysztofhetman.pl/en/

Krzysztof Andrzej Hetman (born 27 June 1974) is a Polish politician who has served as a Member of the European Parliament since 2014. Since December 2023, he has served as Minister of Economic Development and Technology.

== Life and career ==
Born in Lublin, Hetman graduated from Maria Curie-Skłodowska University and soon after worked for Lublin Voivodeship as a deputy director from 2002 to 2005 and as a director of regional development from 2005 to 2007. In 2010, he was named Marshal of Lublin Voivodeship.

Hetman first ran for political office in 2006 when he ran for Lublin city council, but did not win. He also ran in the 2011 Polish parliamentary election as a member of the Polish People's Party. In 2014, he ran in the European Parliament elections in Lublin, and finished first with 24,862 votes.

In the 2023 Polish parliamentary election he was elected to the Sejm from Lublin from Third Way.

== See also ==
- Politics of Poland
- Third Cabinet of Donald Tusk
