= Marlena Maląg =

Polish politician (born 1964)

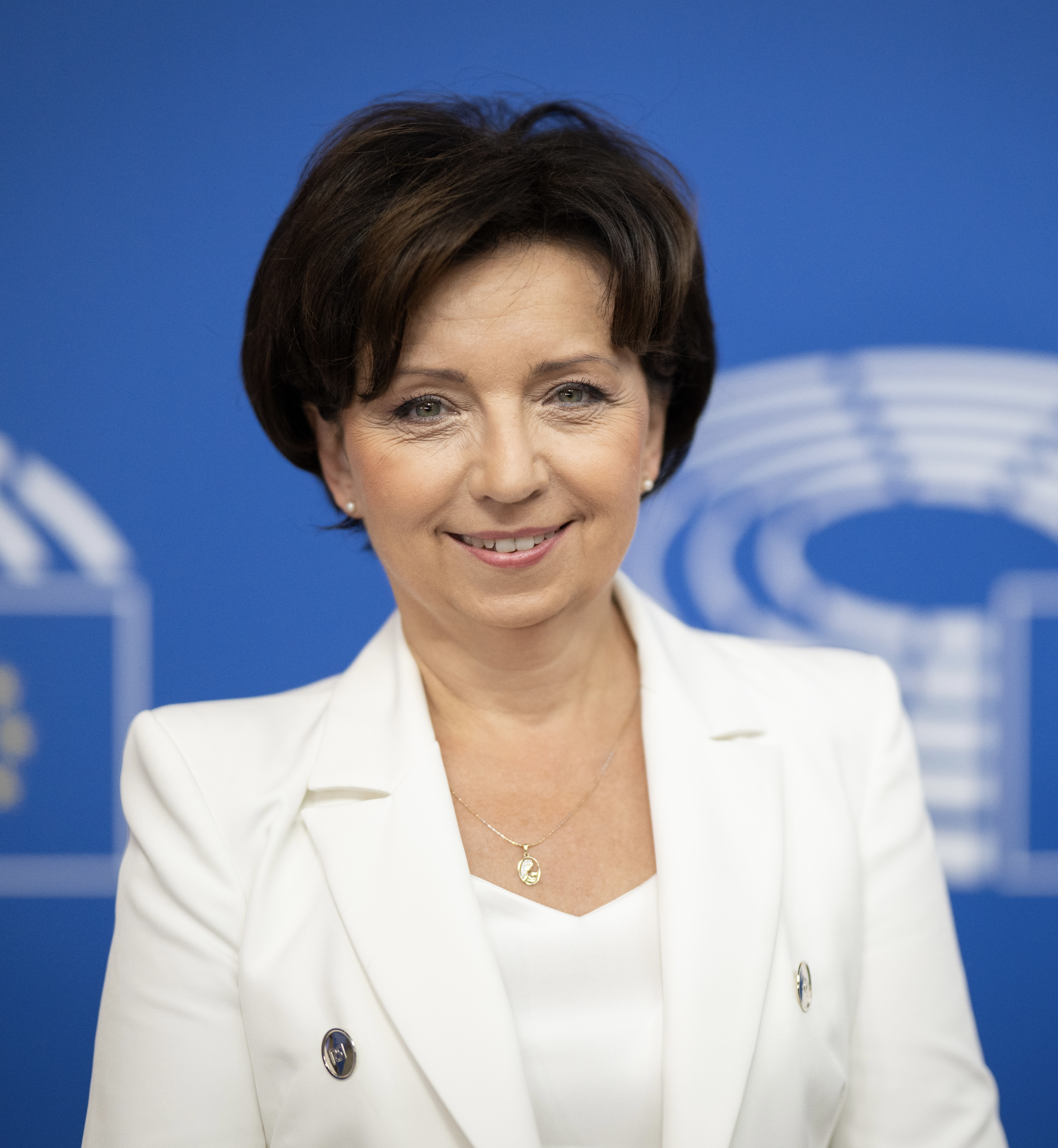

Minister of Economic Development and Technology
- In office 27 November 2023 – 13 December 2023
- President: Andrzej Duda
- Prime Minister: Mateusz Morawiecki
- Preceded by: Waldemar Buda
- Succeeded by: Krzysztof Hetman

Minister of Family, Labour and Social Policy
- In office 15 November 2019 – 27 November 2023
- President: Andrzej Duda
- Prime Minister: Mateusz Morawiecki
- Preceded by: Bożena Borys-Szopa
- Succeeded by: Dorota Bojemska

Personal details
- Born: 2 November 1964 (age 61) Ostrów Wielkopolski
- Party: Law and Justice
- Education: Jan Długosz University

Marlena Magdalena Maląg (born 2 November 1964, in Ostrów Wielkopolski) is a Polish politician, teacher, educational activist and former local government official. She is the Minister of Family, Labour and Social Policy, holding office from 15 November 2019 to 27 November 2023.

She earned her degree at the Faculty of Humanities of the Jan Długosz University (pedagogy), and completed further studies at Adam Mickiewicz University (informatics), Poznań University of Technology (management). and the Baltic College of Humanities (education management).

Maląg was elected to the Sejm in the 2019 parliamentary election as a Law and Justice candidate in the Kalisz district, and earlier served in the Greater Poland Regional Assembly. From 2012 to 2014 she was the Deputy Municipal President (Deputy Mayor) of Ostrów Wielkopolski, from 2015 to 2016 Deputy District Administrator of Ostrów Wielkopolski County, and from 2016 to 2018 the Deputy Voivode of the Greater Poland Voivodeship.

She was the President of the State Fund for the Rehabilitation of the Disabled from December 2018 to November 2019.

Elected as a Member of the European Parliament in 2024. Vice-Chair of the Committee on Economic and Monetary Affairs in the European Parliament.
