= Waldemar Buda =

Polish minister of economic development and technology since 2022

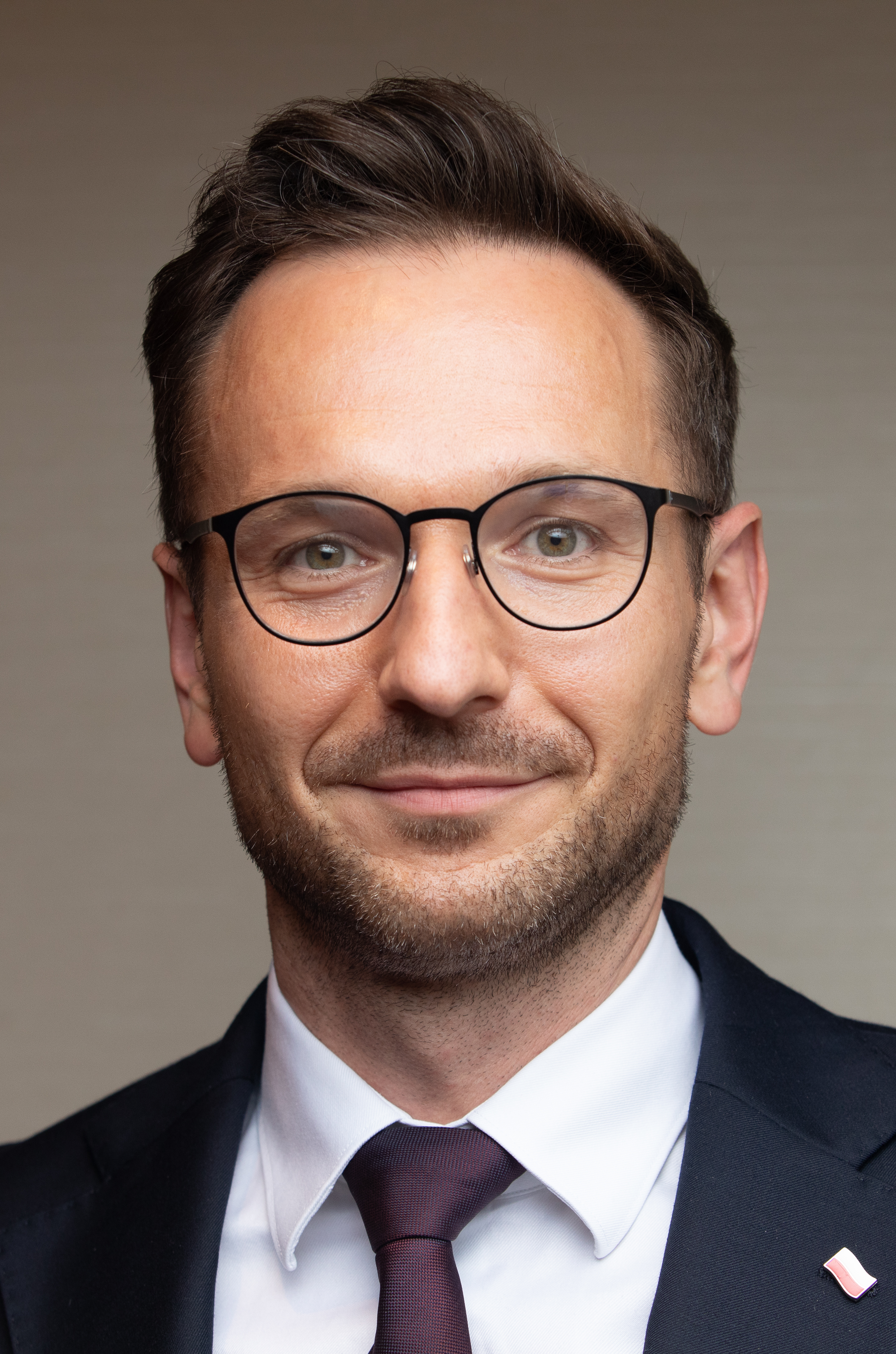

Minister of Economic Development and Technology
- In office 8 April 2022 – 27 November 2023
- President: Andrzej Duda
- Prime Minister: Mateusz Morawiecki
- Preceded by: Piotr Nowak
- Succeeded by: Marlena Maląg

Personal details
- Born: 21 September 1982 (age 43) Turek, Poland
- Children: 2
- Education: University of Łódź
- Profession: politician, lawyer

Waldemar Grzegorz Buda (Polish pronunciation: [val'dɛmar 'buda]; born 21 September 1982 in Turek, Poland) is a Polish politician (Law and Justice) who served as Minister of Economic Development and Technology under Prime Minister Mateusz Morawiecki in his second cabinet from 8 April 2022 to 27 November 2023.

Elected as a Member of the European Parliament in 2024.

== Early life and education ==
Waldemar Buda was born on 21 September 1982 in Turek, Poland. He graduated from the faculty of law and administration at the University of Łódź in 2006.

== Career ==
Buda became a Łódź city councillor in 2014.

== Personal life ==
Waldemar Buda is married and has two children. He runs in his spare time, and organizes an annual charity pilgrimage run to Częstochowa.
