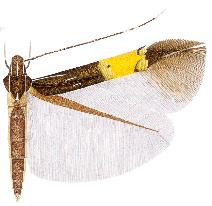

Scientific classification
- Kingdom: Animalia
- Phylum: Arthropoda
- Clade: Pancrustacea
- Class: Insecta
- Order: Lepidoptera
- Family: Cosmopterigidae
- Genus: Cosmopterix
- Species: C. ananke

Binomial name
- Cosmopterix ananke Koster, 2010

= Cosmopterix ananke =

Species of moth from Brazil

Cosmopterix ananke is a moth of the family Cosmopterigidae. It is known from the Federal District of Brazil.

Adults were collected in May.

== Description ==
Male. Forewing length 4.1 mm. Head: frons shining pale ochreous-grey with greenish and reddish reflections, vertex and neck tufts shining dark bronze brown with greenish and reddish gloss, laterally and medially lined white, collar shining dark bronze brown with greenish and reddish gloss; labial palpus first segment very short, white, second segment three-quarters of the length of third, dark brown with white longitudinal lines laterally and ventrally, third segment white, lined brown laterally; scape dorsally dark brown with a white anterior line, ventrally white; antenna shining dark brown, with an interrupted white line from base to beyond one-half, followed towards apex by six dark brown segments, four white, two dark brown, two white, ten dark brown and seven white segments at apex. Thorax and tegulae shining dark bronze brown with reddish gloss, thorax medially with a short white posterior line, tegulae narrowly lined white inwardly. Legs: shining dark brown with reddish gloss, femora of midleg and hindleg shining ochreous-grey with golden reflection, foreleg with a white line on tibia and tarsal segments one, two, base of segment three and segment five, tibia of midleg with white oblique basal and medial lines and a white apical ring, midleg with tarsal segment one with white longitudinal line on outside from base to dorsum at apex, segment two with a white dorsal line in apical half, segments five dorsally white, tibia of hindleg as midleg, tarsal segments one and two with indistinct ochreous dorsal spots, segment three with white dorsal spot, segment four dorsally white and segment five entirely white, spurs dark brown with purplish gloss and with a longitudinal white streak. Forewing shining dark bronze brown with reddish gloss, three white lines in the basal area, a subcostal from base to one-quarter, bending from costa distally, a very short medial above fold, ending beyond apex of subcostal, a subdorsal, shorter than the medial and starting slightly further from base than the latter, a yellow transverse fascia beyond the middle with a very short apical protrusion, narrowed towards dorsum, bordered at the inner edge by a tubercular pale golden metallic fascia with greenish and purplish reflections, subcostally on the outside with a blackish spot, bordered at outer edge by two tubercular pale golden metallic costal and dorsal spots with greenish reflection, the dorsal spot about twice as large as the costal and more towards base, both spots irregularly lined dark brown on the inside, the costal spot outwardly edged by a narrow white costal streak, a shining blue apical line from the distal half of the apical area, shining white in the cilia, cilia dark brown, paler towards dorsum. Hindwing shining dark greyish brown with reddish gloss, cilia brown. Underside: forewing shining dark brown with greenish reflection, the white spot at apex distinctly visible, hindwing shining dark greyish brown. Abdomen dorsally brown, laterally shining pale grey with greenish reflection, ventrally dark greyish brown, segments broadly banded shining yellowish white posteriorly, in middle completely yellowish white, anal tuft pale brownish grey.

== Etymology ==
Named after Ananke, a moon of Jupiter. To be treated as a noun in apposition.
