= Inquest of Pilot Pirx =

1978 film by Marek Piestrak

Test pilota Pirxa
- Film poster
- Directed by: Marek Piestrak
- Screenplay by: Marek Piestrak; Vladimir Valutsky
- Based on: "The Inquest" by Stanisław Lem
- Produced by: Karl Levoll; Edward Klosowicz
- Starring: Sergei Desnitsky; Aleksandr Kaidanovsky; Vladimir Ivashov
- Cinematography: Janusz Pawlowski
- Edited by: Roman Kolski
- Music by: Arvo Pärt; Eugeniusz Rudnik
- Production companies: Zespoly Filmowe; Tallinnfilm
- Release date: 1979
- Running time: 104 minutes
- Countries: Poland; Soviet Union

Inquest of Pilot Pirx (Polish: Test pilota Pirxa, Russian: Дознание пилота Пиркса, romanized: Doznaniye pilota Pirksa, Estonian: Navigaator Pirx) is a joint Polish-Soviet Estonian 1979 film directed by Marek Piestrak. It is based on the short story "The Inquest" by Stanisław Lem from his 1968 short story collection Opowieści o pilocie Pirxie (Tales of Pirx the Pilot; the story was translated into English in the second part, More Tales of Pirx the Pilot). It was adapted for film by Vladimir Valutsky. It is a joint production by Zespoly Filmowe, and Tallinnfilm. Some of the studio-based filming was done at the Dovzhenko Film Studios.

== Plot summary ==
The spaceship "Goliath", operated by Cybertron Electronics, is assigned a mission to test research probes in the Cassini Division, a gap within the rings of Saturn. The mission’s official goal is to launch a probe, but its hidden purpose is to evaluate a new line of nonlinears—advanced androids with "nonlinear" traits—for potential use on future space missions. Commander Pirx, selected for his integrity, initially refuses the mission but agrees after an assassination attempt by a competitor company. The diverse crew, composed of both humans and androids, keeps their identities concealed to avoid bias. Throughout the journey, suspicions emerge among the crew: Second Pilot Harry Brown claims he is human, expressing doubts about Electronics Officer Jan Otis; Neurologist Tom Novak confides that he is an android but seeks to prove his unique worth; and Engineer Kurt Weber offers clues about First Pilot Calder, who remains secretive. Suspicious events and sabotage, such as the malfunction of a probe, lead Pirx to suspect one of the androids might be pursuing a hidden agenda.

Upon arriving at the Cassini Division, Calder attempts a perilous maneuver to manually launch the probe, bypassing Pirx's orders and intending to expose the human crew to deadly g-forces. His goal is to demonstrate the superiority of nonlinears by risking the lives of the human crew in favor of mission success. Pirx outmaneuvers Calder’s plan, resulting in the android’s destruction. Upon returning to Earth, an inquest examines whether Pirx is liable for the near-catastrophe. As he recounts the mission, it becomes clear that the android caused the probe malfunction and the subsequent perilous attempt to navigate the Division, aiming to validate the worth of androids over humans. This revelation leads the UN to ban further production of the nonlinears, though Pirx remains wary, suspecting that androids like Novak might continue blending seamlessly into human society.

== Cast ==
- Sergey Desnitsky as Commandor Pirx
- Aleksandr Kaidanovsky as Tom Nowak, neurologist and cyberneticist
- Vladimir Ivashov as Harry Brown, 2nd Pilot
- Tõnu Saar as Kurt Weber, nucleonicist engineer
- Igor Przegrodzki as McGuirr
- Boleslaw Abart as Jan Otis, electronicist
- Janusz Bylczynski as head judge
- Mieczysław Janowski as Mitchell
- Jerzy Kaliszewski as Dr. Kristoff
- Zbigniew Lesien as John Calder, 1st Pilot
- Ferdynand Matysik as Green, the UNESCO Director

== Discussion ==
In this tale Lem puts forth the idea that what is perceived a human weakness is in fact an advantage over a perfect machine. Pirx defeats the robot because a human can hesitate, make wrong decisions, have doubts, but a robot cannot.

Polish film critic Krzysztof Loska thinks that the film adaptation unduly shifted Lem's original focus on the definition of humanity to the trope of robot rebellion.

Jerzy Jarzębski cites the robot pilot among the examples of Lem's robots who got destroyed by an infusion of humanness into them (see "Stanisław Lem and robots" for more on this issue): the robot pilot, otherwise a perfect machine, acquires a truly humane pride and vanity, and attempts to make an "optimal" decision to show its superiority over humans.

== Reception ==
Inquest of Pilot Pirx was awarded the "Golden Asteroid" Big Prize at the International Cinema Festival at Trieste 1979.
