= Terminus (short story) =

1961 short story by Stanisław Lem

"Terminus" is a science fiction short story by Polish writer Stanisław Lem first published in 1961 in the collection Księga robotów. It is a story of a robot which was damaged in a fatal spaceship accident and started performing eerie actions it was not aware of, as if it was somehow "possessed" by the spaceship crew that had perished in the same accident.

== Plot ==
Pirx becomes a spaceship captain, and his first appointment is an old renovated ship which had been destroyed in a collision with a meteor swarm nineteen years ago, and its crew had perished, marooned without oxygen. On the ship Pirx runs into a robot named Terminus repairing leakages from ship's nuclear engine, and to his surprise Pirx recognizes Morse code in robot's tapping, which appears to carry communications with each other of the long dead crew, isolated in separate cabins. Terminus is unaware of what happens to it. It seems that the memories of the crew got imprinted in robot's circuits, otherwise primitive and lacking any mental abilities. Pirx tries to tap a message himself and gets a frantic response: it appears that these memories began a life of their own, not just a record. Unfazed with the macabre situation, Pirx, typical of his personality, looks for a rational explanation of why would a primitive "iron madman" seem to suffer from PTSD. Eventually realizing the pointlessness of this kind of "communication with the dead", Pirx decides to scrap Terminus.

== Discussion ==
Wojciech Orliński describes the story as a superb example of the transfer of the macabre atmosphere characteristic of Stefan Grabiński, a "Polish Poe", to science fiction. Lem himself in an interview admits the influence of Grabiński's horror stories on his early works, including Terminus. As Dominika Oramus puts it: the tale of Terminus "is told in a mis-en-scene of horror with supernatural innuendoes. A gigantic, empty ship, rusty machinery, a murky past and dusty pilot seats set the mood at the very beginning."

Jerzy Jarzębski and Dominika Oramus cite Terminus among the examples of Lem's robots who got destroyed by an infusion of humanness into them (see "Robots in the works of Stanisław Lem" for more on this issue).
