= Krzysztof Paszyk =

Polish politician (born 1979)

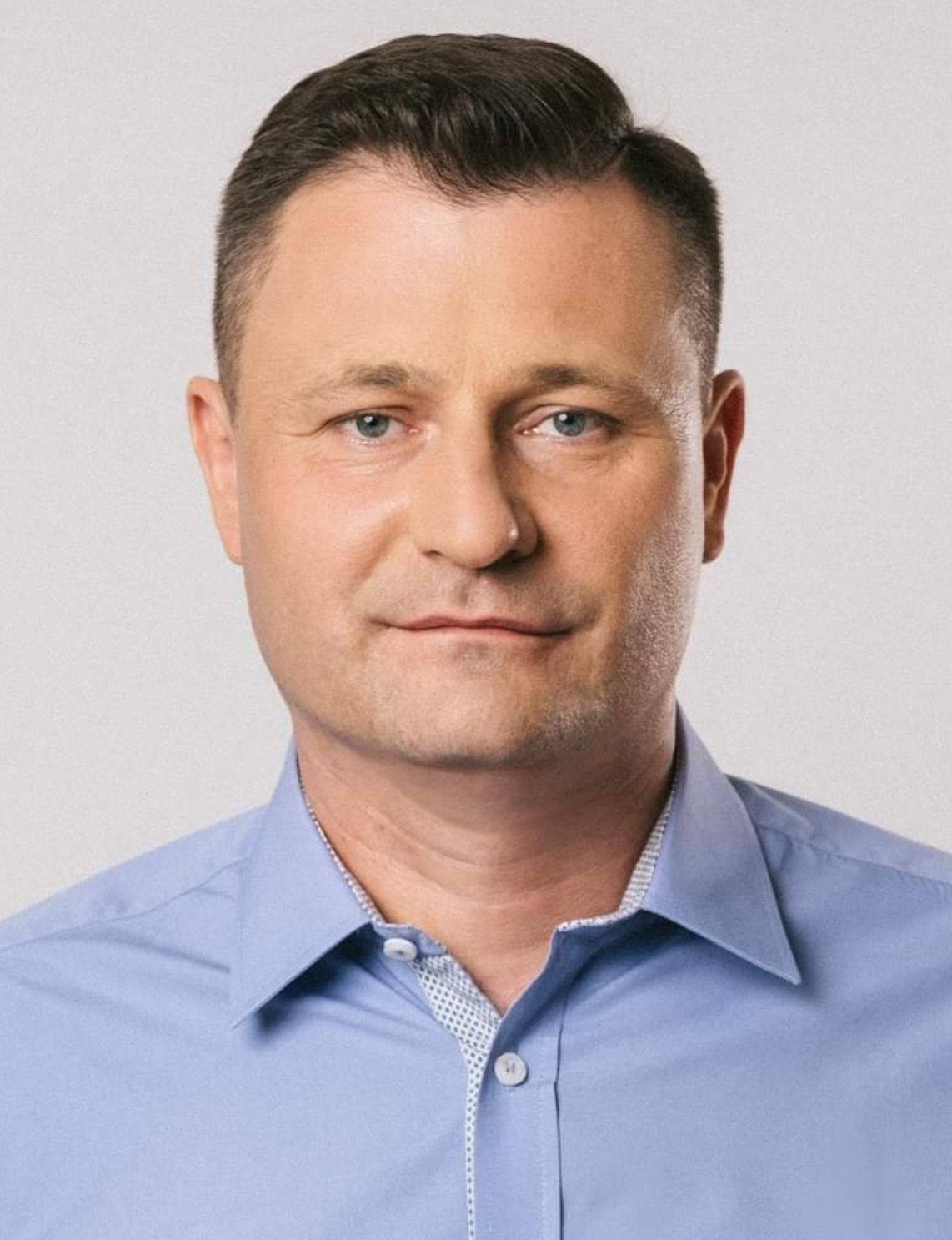
- Paszyk in 2024

Minister of Economic Development and Technology
- In office 13 May 2024 – 24 July 2025
- Prime Minister: Donald Tusk
- Preceded by: Krzysztof Hetman

Member of the Sejm
- Incumbent
- Assumed office 12 November 2015
- Constituency: Piła

Personal details
- Born: 10 April 1979 (age 47)
- Party: Polish People's Party
- Education: Mickiewicz University in Poznań

Krzysztof Paszyk (born 10 April 1979) is a Polish politician serving as minister of economic development and technology since 2024. He has been a member of the Sejm since 2015.
