= HYPE =

Polish PocketQube satellite

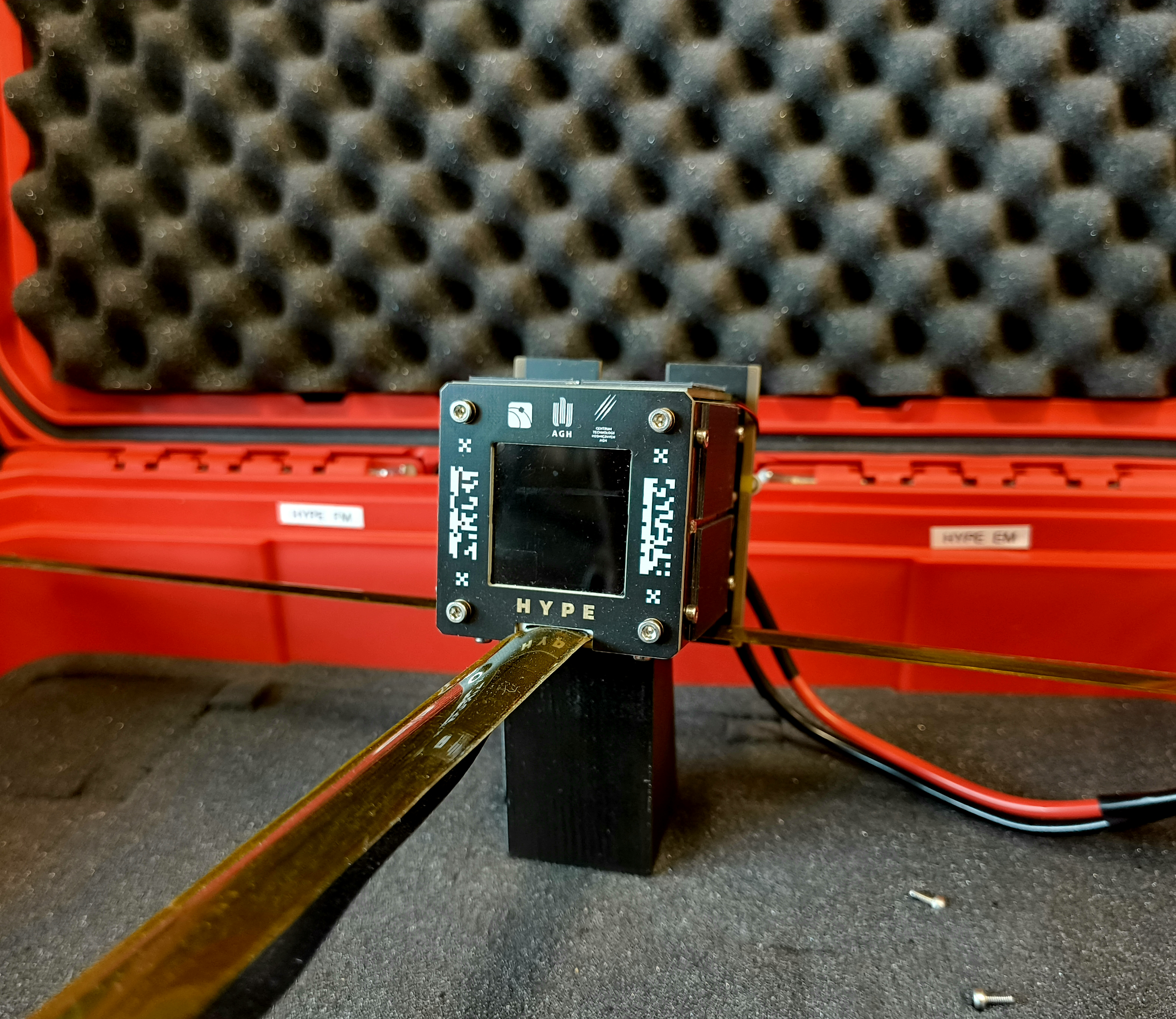
- An image of HYPE prototype near completion
- Mission type: Technology demonstration
- Operator: AGH University of Krakow
- COSPAR ID: 2025-009CG
- SATCAT no.: 62687

Spacecraft properties
- Spacecraft type: PocketQube
- Manufacturer: SatLab AGH

Start of mission
- Launch date: 14 January 2025, 19:09:00 UTC
- Rocket: Falcon 9
- Launch site: Vandenberg SCL-4
- Contractor: SpaceX Transporter-12

Orbital parameters
- Regime: LEO
- Apogee altitude: 525 kilometres (326 mi)

HYPE is the first Polish PocketQube picosatellite developed by students at the AGH University of Krakow. Designed to showcase a custom 1P (5x5x5 cm) platform with a "selfie-stick" to image a 240x240 px LCD screen on the satellite's surface and a VIS-NIR miniature spectrometer. At the time of its launch onboard the Falcon 9 Transporter-12 it was the smallest Polish satellite.

== Development ==
The name of the satellite - HYPE - was chosen by the students due to their enthusiasm for the project and to show that space is in reach for everyone. The satellite is part of a proof-of-concept activity to promote the expansion of AGH's building capabilities and to expand various AGH laboratories with ground infrastructure to allow further space missions advancement on campus.

The development of the HYPE project started in 2023 by the SatLab AGH student research group in cooperation with the AGH Space Technology Centre. A dedicated Satellite Assembly Laboratory and Mission Control Room were arranged. A special parabolic antenna with a meteorological system was installed on AGH premises to facilitate communication with HYPE as well as with future satellites planned by the group.

In 2024, after the completion of preliminary components tests, the first HYPE prototype was assembled. Both the calibration of satellite instruments and the environmental tests (vibration, shock, thermal) were performed. The communication test was conducted using a stratospheric balloon that reached an altitude of 37 km AGL. The final work on HYPE satellite was completed in July 2024. The spacecraft was transported from AGH laboratories to Alba Orbital HQ to integrate it with the deployment device.

The team behind HYPE has already started a larger 2U (20x10x10 cm) Cubesat satellite project to include a 4-band push-broom multispectral camera, a high-resolution RGB camera and an experimental laser communication module among other payloads.

== Construction and Payload ==
The HYPE satellite's structure is based on a specially designed frame made of anodized 6061 aluminum alloy. The spacecraft contains an in-house built On-Board Computer (OBC), batteries, EPS system based on a series of photovoltaic cells and sunlight sensors, ADCS system relying on a set of magnetorquers, LCD screen on the front wall of the satellite with a "selfie-stick" pointing at it and a miniature spectrometer in the VIS-NIR range. The communication system is based on a radio module and special spring steel antennas. In addition, the satellite has a burn-wire-based deployment system that allows the antennas and the "selfie-stick" to unfold after launch.

The purpose of the screen and camera module was to promote the achievements of the Polish space sector and to popularize space exploration. The HYPE satellite's mission goal was also to test the effectiveness of experimental large-area mosaic spectroscopy of the Earth. A miniature spectrometer weighing less than 0,5 g with a spectral range from 640 to 1050 nm and a spectral resolution of approximately 2 nm was introduced to enable the analysis of the degree of forest degradation, as well as the monitoring of the movement of emitted gases and volcanic dust.

== Mission ==
The HYPE mission started on January 14, 2025, at 19:09:00 UTC. The SpaceX Falcon 9 B5 rocket with the satellite onboard was launched from the Vandenberg Space Force Base SLC-4, California, U.S. After reaching the intended LEO orbit of 510 km at 20:20:47 UTC, D-Orbit's platform called ION-SCV 016 (Eminent Emmanuel), carrying the HYPE satellite, was detached from the Falcon 9 B5 rocket. Then, after 9 days, HYPE was deployed into space from the AlbaPod 2 module.

On January 23, 2025, around 12:17 UTC, the HYPE satellite initiated the procedure of opening its antennas and "selfie-stick", which was successful. The satellite started emitting radio signals that were first received by radio stations in New Zealand. On the same day, communication with the satellite was established using the ground station installed at AGH.

On January 24, 2025, communication with HYPE was temporarily lost due to excessive cooling of one of the radio modules. The satellite's security protections allowed communication to resume two days later. Once communication was stabilized, testing of individual satellite modules was activated. All of the tested subsystems were functioning properly.

On February 16, 2025, the HYPE satellite took its first space selfie featuring the “SatLab AGH” student research team. From a technical point of view, the space selfie also enabled the research team to inspect the condition of the satellite after it was deployed into orbit.

On February 21, 2025, the HYPE satellite took its second space selfie showing the popular meme “Poland Can Into Space”. The photo with the meme was shared on Reddit, where it was viewed by over 2,2 million people.

Over the following weeks of the mission, tests of other components were performed and the team prepared a software update to fix errors found during the first weeks of the mission.

The HYPE mission ended after 54 days 21 hours and 15 minutes due to a loss of communication with the satellite. It was determined that the satellite had been damaged by a strong geomagnetic storm.

== See also ==
- List of Polish satellites
