= Ministry of Economic Development and Technology (Poland) =

Government ministry of Poland

- Ministerstwo Rozwoju i Technologii
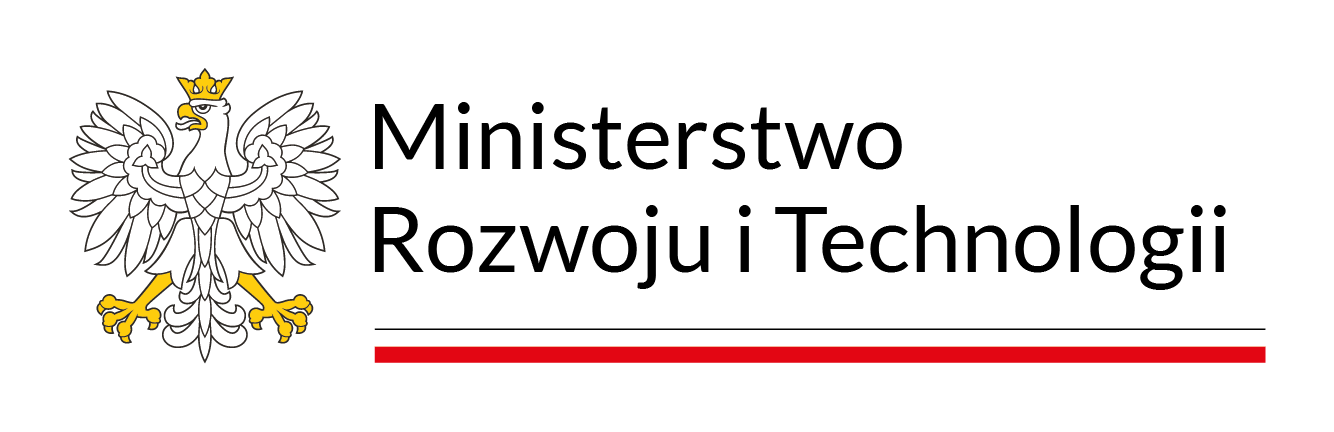

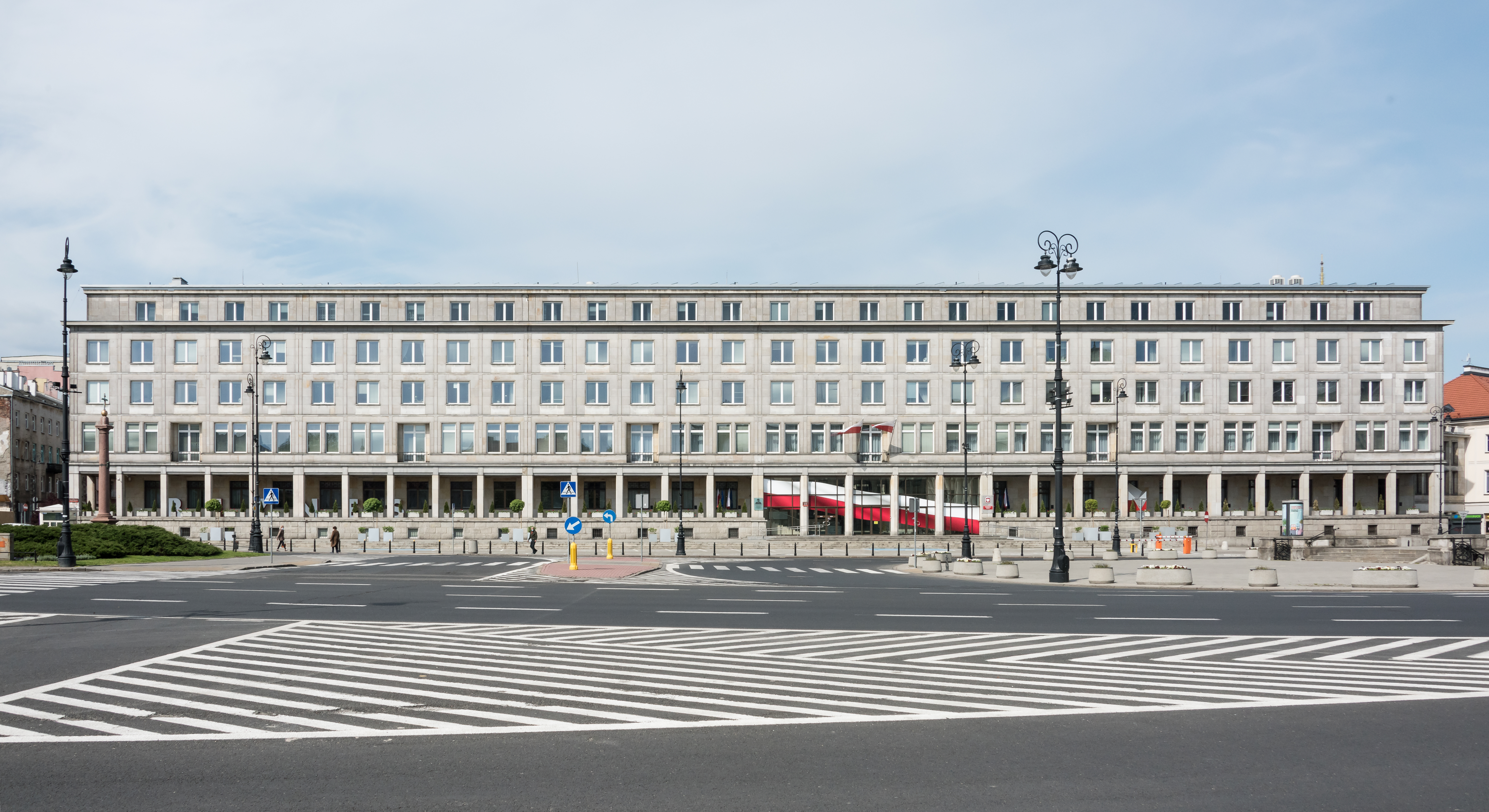
- Headquarters building at Three Crosses Square in Warsaw

Agency overview
- Jurisdiction: Government of Poland
- Headquarters: Three Crosses Square 3/5, Warsaw, Poland; 52.2285°N 21.0217°E
- Minister responsible: Andrzej Domański, Minister of Economic Development and Technology
- Parent agency: Council of Ministers
- Website: https://www.gov.pl/web/development-technology

The Ministry of Economic Development and Technology is a department of the Polish government supporting the minister responsible for three departments of government administration construction, spatial planning and development and housing and economy. It was formed on August 12, 2021.

== Ministers ==
Portrait	Name	Party	Term of Office		Prime minister(Cabinet)
	Piotr Nowak	Nonpartisan	6 October 2021	7 April 2022	Mateusz Morawiecki ( Morawiecki II)
	Waldemar Buda	Law and Justice	8 April 2022	27 November 2023	Mateusz Morawiecki Morawiecki II)
	Marlena Maląg	Law and Justice	27 November 2023	13 December 2023	Mateusz Morawiecki ( Morawiecki III)
	Krzysztof Hetman	Polish People's Party	13 December 2023	13 May 2024	Donald Tusk (Tusk III)
	Krzysztof Paszyk	Polish People's Party	13 May 2024	24 July 2025	Donald Tusk (Tusk III)
	Andrzej Domański	Civic Platform	24 July 2025	Present	Donald Tusk (Tusk III)
