= Tales of Pirx the Pilot =

1965 short stories by Stanisław Lem

First edition (Russian)

Tales of Pirx the Pilot (Polish: Opowieści o pilocie Pirxie) is a science fiction stories collection by Polish author Stanisław Lem, about a spaceship pilot named Pirx.

Individual stories were published during 1959-1965 in various collections. The first collection of stories specifically about Pirx was published in 1965 in the Soviet Union in Russian under the title Охота на Сэтавра ("The Hunt for Setaur"). It was translated in Latvian as Petaura medības in 1966. In 2009 a Lithuanian publisher Eridanas published the story as Setauro Medžioklė. In Poland a more complete collection (as Opowieści o pilocie Pirxie) was published in 1968, and translated to English in two parts (Tales of Pirx the Pilot and More Tales of Pirx the Pilot) in 1979 and 1982. Pirx stories include both philosophical and comic elements. A fragment of "The Hunt for Setaur" was added to the required curriculum for Polish junior-high school students in the 1990s.

== Pirx universe ==
About the country of origin of Pirx, we know only that money there are called "crowns" (koruny). The time frame of the events may sometimes look like near future: while some stories mention private businesses, Orlinski describes the landscapes in stories as "inspired by those of Polish People's Republic". At the same time, "The romantic times of astronautics have long gone" and mankind is busy colonizing the Solar System, has some settlements on the Moon and Mars, and is even beginning the exploration of the other star systems.

Pirx is a cadet, a pilot, and finally a captain of a merchant spaceship, and the stories relate his life and various things that happen to him during his travels between the Earth, Moon, and Mars.

== Pirx ==
In a way, Pirx is an ordinary "working man" who unlike traditional heroic space pilots has little if anything heroic about him. He sometimes finds himself in extreme situations, which he overcomes mostly through ordinary common sense and average luck. In particular, in the story The Inquest, Lem puts forth the idea that what is perceived a human weakness is in fact an advantage over a perfect machine. In this tale Pirx defeats the robot, because a human can hesitate, make wrong decisions, have doubts, but a robot cannot.

== Stories ==
Tales of Pirx the Pilot was translated by Louis Iribarne. More Tales of Pirx the Pilot was also translated by Iribarne, with the assistance of Magdalena Majcherczyk. An exception is "The Hunt", translated by Michael Kandel.

Tales of Pirx the Pilot

- "The Test"
  Cadet Pirx is assigned to perform a test space flight, during which a fly inside the cabin short circuits the circuitry of the controls.
- "The Conditioned Reflex"
  Pirx is assigned internship at a station on the far side of the Moon, where the previous crew had mysteriously perished.
- "On Patrol"
  After graduating, Pirx became a patrol pilot overseeing distant sectors of the solar system where two pilots failed to return from. He notices a strange object on the screen and started chasing it...
- "The Albatross"
  The story is a psychological thriller in which the crews of rescuer spaceships are left helpless witnesses to the disaster on Albatross due to its reactor failure.
- "Terminus"
  Pirs witnesses a robot which was damaged in a fatal spaceship accident and started performing eerie actions it was not aware of, as if it was somehow "possessed" by the spaceship crew that had perished in the same accident.

More Tales of Pirx the Pilot

- "The Hunt"
  Pirx, now a starship commander, takes part in a hunt for a mining robot, which got damaged and started attacking people with laser. He comes face to face with the robot, but did not fire at it, knowing that the robot is much faster. At that moment a rock next to Pirx is hit by laser from the vehicle of another hunter team. The robot hits the vehicle thus saving Pirx, and Pirx hits the robot. Later it turns out that another team didn't see robot and were aiming at Pirx, mistaking him for the robot. Pirx concludes that the robot deliberately saved him, because, with its perfect logic, the robot saw that it was not the target. Therefore Pirx begins to feel remorse...
- "Pirx's Tale"
  Pirx tells a story of what had happened during his stint as a commander on an old malfunctioning starship with a ragtag crew. They met a huge drifting object amid a meteor swarm that looks like an alien artifact, but the opportunity of the first contact was lost due to a mishap: he cannot transmit the recorded coordinates to the base because it turned out that the tape recorder was out of tape. And he was hesitating whether to report orally by radio, because he was in violation of numerous instructions...
- "The Accident"
  Pirx solves the mystery of a disappeared robot. Pirx figured out that the robot crashed while climbing a mountain without any apparent reason. Pirx concluded that it undertook the endeavor of its own free will, acting as an alpinist looking for a difficult climb. Pirx's colleagues dismiss this hypothesis.
- "The Inquest"
  For plot summary, see Inquest of Pilot Pirx, a 1978 film
- "Ananke"
  Pirx investigated a crash of a state-of the-art spaceship and find out that its artificial intelligence was trained by a former starship commander who was discharged from commanding due to his OCPD, but who was found to be suitable as a trainer due to his meticulosity associated with the disorder. (In Polish, OCPD is called "ananke syndrome", hence the title of the story.) Pirx concludes that starship's computer inherited the OCPD trait from the trainer and started doing a large number of marginally relevant actions, which slowed down its processing speed.

== Adaptations ==
A television mini-series, Pirx kalandjai (The Adventures of Pirx), was released in Hungary in 1973. A Polish-Soviet feature-length film, Inquest of Pilot Pirx, was released in 1979.

== Reception ==
Dave Langford reviewed More Tales of Pirx the Pilot for White Dwarf #42, and stated that "The perfect thinking machine is never perfect because it's been built by fallible us. 'A robot that can match man mentally and not be capable of lying or cheating is a fantasy.' So much for Asimov's Three Laws of Robotics!"

== Reviews ==
- Review by Bob Mecoy (1980) in Future Life, May 1980
- Review by Ian Watson (1981) in Foundation, #21 February 1981
- Review by George Zebrowski (1981) in The Magazine of Fantasy & Science Fiction, April 1981
- Review by Bruce Gillespie (1981) in SF Commentary, #62/63/64/65/66
- Review by David Langford [as by Dave Langford] (1981) in Paperback Inferno, Volume 5, Number 2
- Review by Bob Mecoy (1982) in Heavy Metal, August 1982
- Review by Norman Beswick (1991) in Paperback Inferno, #88

== See also ==
- The Hunt (1950s Stanisław Lem short story), a precursor of The Hunt of Pirx's tales.
