= Pilot Pirx =

Fictional character by Stanisław Lem

Pilot Pirx is a fictional character introduced in 1966 in the science fiction stories of Polish writer Stanisław Lem: ten short stories (published in English in two parts, 1979's Tales of Pirx the Pilot and 1982's More Tales of Pirx the Pilot). Later he appeared in the novel Fiasco.

In the stories, Pirx is progressively depicted as a spaceship cadet, simply Pirx (which hurts his feelings because he had already become pilot and he'd rather be addressed as "pilot Pirx"), beginner pilot, a seasoned pilot, navigator, and finally, captain (komandor).

In 7 of the 10 stories Pirx acts in the role of Sherlock Holmes, to investigate mysterious events.

The last appearance of Pirx is in the first half of Lem's later novel Fiasco. The identity of the protagonist in the second half is never firmly established, but Pirx is one of the two possibilities. The bulk of the novel is set much further in the future, and it is vastly different from Lem's previous works.

== Personality traits ==
While this overall storyline resembles that of a bildungsroman, Lem writes that it was not his intention; he was going to write only 2–3 stories. Therefore, Pirx does not really have any background: no family, not even a first name. The timid attitude of Pirx towards women, as seen in stories The Conditioned Reflex and The Albatross (the only two where Pirx interacts with women), may lead to the conclusion that he is a hardcore loner. (However in the 1973 Hungarian TV miniseries The Adventures of Pirx he had a love interest, a budding journalist, Glória.) From the story On Patrol we know that he smoked and liked spicy food and beer.

About his country of origin, we know only that money there are called "crowns" (koruny). The time frame of the events may look like near future: while some stories mention private businesses, at the same time Orlinski describes the landscapes in stories as "inspired by those of Polish People's Republic". At the same time, "The romantic times of astronautics have long gone" and mankind is busy colonizing the Solar System, has some settlements on the Moon and Mars, and is even beginning the exploration of the other star systems.

Unlike traditional heroic space pilots, Pirx is as an ordinary "space truck driver" and has little if anything heroic about him. Personality traits of Pirx include cold blood, self-control and common sense—which serve Pirx well in all his predicaments. Pirx is also described as "noble-minded to the extent of being decent" (zacny aż do poczciwości). Pirx is of average intelligence and he rather relies on his instinct. Often he solves his problems by chance, but he does "give a chance a chance", a philosophy elaborated by Lem in his essay, The Philosophy of Chance. For example, in the story The Inquest, where Pirx is tasked with identifying a perfect android among a space crew, all his smart questioning and tests are for nothing and only by chance the circumstances give Pirx a chance. In this story, Lem also puts forth the idea that what may be perceived a human weakness is in fact an advantage over a perfect machine. In this tale Pirx succeeds because a human can hesitate, have doubts, but a robot cannot because it is programmed to be perfectly effective. In a sense, Pirx here is an anti-hero: he defeats the perfect robot due to his lack of resolution, mistakes, and his decency—the latter may also be perceived as a drawback, because it stands in the way of ideal effectiveness.

In the opinion of Robert Stiller, Pirx "does not have to be, and is not a hero nor personality, nor an intellectual, only an average man in this profession; his adventures are sometimes on the verge of comedy and sometimes of drama. As a concept, it is an advantage and a novelty in the genre."

== Adaptations and other appearances ==
A television mini-series, Pirx kalandjai (The Adventures of Pirx), was released in Hungary in 1973.

There is a 1979 film Pilot Pirx's Inquest (Test pilota Pirxa) based on the story Inquest, a Polish-Soviet (Estonia and Ukraine) collaboration.

In the short story "Appendix Solariana" (2014) by Wiktor Żwikiewicz, Commander Pirx visits the Station by Solaris, possibly as another creation of the ocean-planet.

== Commemoration ==
The July 2008 issue 107 of 3D World magazine features the 3D rendering of Commander Pirx by Anders Lejczak, both on the magazine cover and pages 2–3.

In 2009 an exoplanet was discovered and named after Pirx.

When NASA was fishing for naming ideas for features on Pluto and its moons mapped with the help of New Horizons, the name "Pirx" for a crater on Charon received an overwhelming support among Russian voters and the name was approved in 2018.

On July 7, 2026, the Polish Ministry of Defense announced that the first of their MikroGLOB Earth observation satellites developed by Creotech was launched on the SpaceX Transporter-17 mission with the name PIRX-1 in honor of the character.
