= Vega flight VV16 =

Low Earth orbit rideshare commercial flight for 21 customers

- CNES CSG sticker artwork

Vega launch
- Launch: 3 September 2020, 01:51:10 UTC
- Operator: Arianespace
- Pad: Kourou, ELV
- Payload: 53 satellites
- Outcome: Success

Vega launches

Vega flight VV16, also called SSMS PoC Flight (for Small Spacecraft Mission Service Proof of Concept Flight), was the 16th launch of the Vega rocket. This first low Earth orbit rideshare commercial flight for 21 customers embarked a total of 65 satellites—53 satellites to be released by the launch vehicle directly plus an additional 12 that were later released by one of them—arranged in the modular SSMS dispenser. The launch was also notable as it was the first Vega launch following the accident of the VV15 launch in July 2019 that caused the loss of FalconEye1 satellite.

== Launch campaign ==
Launch campaign activities were significantly affected by the COVID-19 pandemic. To prevent the spread of the epidemic in French Guiana and protect Guiana Space Centre employees, all launch activities were suspended on 16 March 2020. Operations for VV16 and Ariane flight VA253 could not resume until 28 April 2020. VV16 activities were listed among the top priorities at the reopening of the Guiana Space Center on 11 May 2020.

It was initially scheduled to take place on 19 June 2020 at 01:51:10 UTC but got postponed due to unfavourable high-altitude winds. The launch was then postponed to take place on 27 June 2020, and later to 29 June 2020 due to the weather conditions, and had to be postponed again until 17 August 2020. Then postponed due to Ariane 5 flight VA253 launch on 15 August 2020 at 22:04 UTC.

Arianespace announced on 1 September 2020 that the mission was postponed. Typhoon Maysak is forecast to move near the South Korean island of Jeju, the site of a telemetry station needed to track the Vega rocket after it lifts off from French Guiana. The tracking station will be secured ahead of the typhoon's arrival. "A new launch date will be set based on the evolution of the tropical storm's situation over the Jeju station and its consequences", Arianespace said in a statement. The launch date was further adjusted to 2 September 2020, then on 3 September 2020 at 01:51:10 UTC.

== Flight ==
The flight was launched from the ELV launch pad in Kourou, Centre Spatial Guyanais. It deployed all satellites into 2 slightly different Sun-synchronous orbits: the 7 heaviest satellites were separated at an altitude of roughly 515 km (starting 40 minutes and 25 seconds until 52 minutes and 35 seconds after liftoff), before the upper stage was re-ignited to place the 46 lightest satellites at an altitude of approximately 530 km (starting 1 hour 42 minutes and 16 seconds until 1 hour 44 minutes and 56 seconds after liftoff).

== Payload ==
Of the 53 satellites that were released, 7 microsatellites weigh between 15.4 kg and 150 kg (one of them contained 12 CubeSats), while the other 46 are smaller CubeSats (between 0.25U and 6U) weighing between 0.250 kg and 7 kg:

Payload configuration
| Name | Mass | Orbit | Lifetime | Owner | Manufacturer | Application | Notes |
|---|---|---|---|---|---|---|---|
| ATHENA | 138 kg | 515 km SSO | 2 years | PointView (Facebook) | Maxar Technologies | Telecommunication | |
| GHGSat-C1 | 15.4 kg | 515 km SSO | 3 years | GHGSat | SFL | Remote sensing | |
| Nemo HD | 65 kg | 515 km SSO | 3–5 years | Space-SI | SFL with Space-SI | Remote sensing | |
| UPM-Sat 2 | 45 kg | 515 km SSO | 2 years | IDR-UPM | IDR-UPM | Tech. demo. | |
| ESAIL | 112 kg | 515 km SSO | 4 years | ExactEarth | LuxSpace | Remote sensing | |
| ION CubeSat Carrier (& Flock-4v 15–26) | 150 kg | 515 km SSO | 4 years | Planet Labs | D-Orbit | Tech. demo. | Contained 12 CubeSats to be released later, namely Flock-4v 15–26. |
| NewSat-6 | 43.5 kg | 515 km SSO | 3–4 years | Satellogic | Satellogic | Remote sensing | |
| SpaceBEE 10-21 | | 530 km SSO | | Swarm Technology | Swarm Technology | Telecommunication | 12 CubeSats (0.25U) |
| Flock-4v 1-14 | | 530 km SSO | | Planet Labs | Planet Labs | Remote sensing | 14 CubeSats (3U). They were part of a larger batch of 26; the remaining 12 (Flock-4v 15–26) were deployed separately by the ION CubeSat Carrier. |
| Lemur-2 112-119 | | 530 km SSO | | SPIRE Global | SPIRE Global | Telecommunication | 8 CubeSats (3U) |
| ³Cat-5 /A and /B | | 530 km SSO | | UPC and ESA | Deimos and Tyvak | Remote sensing | 2 CubeSats (6U) |
| DIDO-3 | | 530 km SSO | | SpacePharma | SpacePharma | Research | 1 CubeSat (3U) |
| PICASSO | | 530 km SSO | | ESA | BIRA-IASB | Remote sensing | 1 CubeSat (3U) |
| SIMBA | | 530 km SSO | | ESA | KMI-IRM | Remote sensing | 1 CubeSat (3U) |
| TriSat | | 530 km SSO | | University of Maribor | SkyLabs | Remote sensing | 1 CubeSat (3U) |
| TTÜ-100 | | 530 km SSO | | TalTech | TalTech | Remote sensing | 1 CubeSat (2U) |
| AMICal Sat | | 530 km SSO | | CSUG and MSU | CSUG and SatRevolution | Remote sensing | 1 CubeSat (2U) |
| NAPA-1 | | 530 km SSO | | Royal Thai Air Force | ISISpace | Remote sensing | 1 CubeSat (6U) |
| TARS-1 | | 530 km SSO | | Kepler Communications | ÅAC Clyde Space | Telecommunication | 1 CubeSat (6U) |
| Tyvak-0171 | | 530 km SSO | | (undisclosed) | Tyvak | (undisclosed) | 1 CubeSat (6U) |
| OSM-1 Cicero | | 530 km SSO | | Orbital Solutions | Tyvak | Remote sensing | 1 CubeSat (6U) |

== See also ==
- List of Vega launches

== Sources ==
- "COVID-19 / Suspension des campagnes de lancement au Centre Spatial Guyanais" (PDF) (in French). Arianespace. 16 March 2020. Archived (PDF) from the original on 17 March 2020.
- "Epidémie de COVID-19 / Plan de continuité d'activité au CNES" (PDF) (in French). CNES. 16 March 2020. Archived (PDF) from the original on 3 May 2020.
- "COVID-19 CNES helping to combat the epidemic and sustain the nation's economic activity" (PDF). CNES. 23 March 2020. Archived (PDF) from the original on 3 May 2020.
- "Resumption of launch campaign operations and construction of Ariane 6 ELA4 launch complex at Guiana Space Centre" (PDF). CNES. 28 April 2020. Archived (PDF) from the original on 3 May 2020.
- "COVID-19: Arianespace to resume its launch campaigns at the Guiana Space Center". Arianespace. 29 April 2020. Archived from the original on 3 May 2020.
- "Nationwide lifting of lockdown begins - Phased resumption of on-site operations at CNES's four centres" (PDF). CNES. 11 May 2020. Archived (PDF) from the original on 11 May 2020.
- Henry, Caleb (29 April 2020). "Guiana Space Center launches to resume in June". SpaceNews.com.
