= List of Polish satellites =

This list covers all artificial satellites built and operated by institutions or companies from Poland.

Launched in 2010s
#	Name	COSPAR ID	Purpose	Consortium	Launch date	Launch vehicle	Launch site
1	PW-Sat	2012-006G	Technology demonstration	Warsaw University of Technology, Space Research Centre	13 February 2012	Vega	Guiana Space Centre
2	Lem	2013-066R	Astronomy	Space Research Centre, Centrum Astronomiczne im. Mikołaja Kopernika PAN	21 November 2013	Dnepr	Yasny
3	Heweliusz	2014-049B	Astronomy	Space Research Centre, Centrum Astronomiczne im. Mikołaja Kopernika PAN	9 August 2014	Chang Zheng 4B	Taiyuan
4	PW-Sat2	2018-099-BJ	Technology demonstration	Warsaw University of Technology	3 December 2018	Falcon 9	SLC-4
5	Światowid	1998-067QL	Earth Observation	SatRev	17 April 2019	Antares	Mid-Atlantic Regional Spaceport
6	KRAKSAT	1998-067QM	Technology demonstration	Jagiellonian University, SatRev	17 April 2019	Antares	Mid-Atlantic Regional Spaceport

Launched in 2020s
#	Name	COSPAR ID	Purpose	Consortium	Launch date	Launch vehicle	Launch site
7	AMICal Sat		Earth Observation	SatRev, Grenoble Alpes University, Moscow State University	3 September 2020	Vega	Guiana Space Centre
8	STORK 5	2021-058B	Earth Observation	SatRev	30 June 2021	LauncherOne	Mojave Air and Space Port
9	STORK 4	2021-058C	Earth Observation	SatRev	30 June 2021	LauncherOne	Mojave Air and Space Port
10	LabSat	2022-002DG	Technology demonstration	Wroclaw University of Science and Technology, SatRev	13 January 2022	Falcon 9 Transporter-3	SLC-40
11	STORK 1	2022-002DH	Earth Observation	SatRev	13 January 2022	Falcon 9 Transporter-3	SLC-40
12	STORK 2	2022-002DJ	Earth Observation	SatRev	13 January 2022	Falcon 9 Transporter-3	SLC-40
13	SW1FT	2022-002DK	Technology demonstration	SatRev	13 January 2022	Falcon 9 Transporter-3	SLC-40
14	STORK 3	2022-003E	Earth Observation	SatRev	13 January 2022	LauncherOne	Mojave Air and Space Port
15	Intuition-1	2023-174CW	Earth Observation	KP-Labs, AAC Clyde Space	11 November 2023	Falcon 9	SLC-4
16	Replicator	2024-128X	Technology demonstration	Orbital Matter	9 July 2024	Ariane 62	ELA-4
17	EagleEye	2024-149AS	Earth Observation	POLSA, Creotech	15 August 2024	Falcon 9	SLC-4
18	HYPE	2025-009CG	Technology demonstration	AGH University of Krakow	14 January 2025	Falcon 9	SLC-4
19	BlueBon	2025-009CH	Earth Observation	SatRev, TelePIX, Ministry of Science and ICT, POLSA	14 January 2025	Falcon 9	SLC-4
20	PIAST-S1	2025-276CM	Earth Observation	Ministry of National Defence, POLSA, Creotech	28 November 2025	Falcon 9	SLC-4
21	PIAST-S2	2025-276CV	Earth Observation	Ministry of National Defence, POLSA, Creotech	28 November 2025	Falcon 9	SLC-4
22	PIAST-M	2025-276CW	Earth Observation	Ministry of National Defence, POLSA, Creotech	28 November 2025	Falcon 9	SLC-4
23	ICEYE-X62 (MikroSAR 1)	2025-276CT	Earth Observation	Ministry of National Defence, ICEYE	28 November 2025	Falcon 9	SLC-4
24	ICEYE-X75 (MikroSAR 2)	2026-067CK	Earth Observation	Ministry of National Defence, ICEYE	30 March 2026	Falcon 9	SLC-4
25	ICEYE-X76 (MikroSAR 3)	2026-067CQ	Earth Observation	Ministry of National Defence, ICEYE	30 March 2026	Falcon 9	SLC-4
26	Eycore-1	2026-100U	Earth Observation	Eycore, NanoAvionics	3 May 2026	Falcon 9	SLC-4
27	ICEYE-X78 (MikroSAR 4)	2026-100R	Earth Observation	Ministry of National Defence, ICEYE	3 May 2026	Falcon 9	SLC-4
28	PIRX-1 (MikroGLOB 1)	2026-156AC	Earth Observation	Ministry of National Defence, Creotech	7 July 2026	Falcon 9 Transporter-17	SLC-4E
29	Replicator 2	2026-156BL	Technology demonstration	Orbital Matter	7 July 2026	Falcon 9 Transporter-17	SLC-4E
30	MikroGLOB 2	2026-227BD	Earth Observation	Ministry of National Defence, Creotech	1 October 2026	Falcon 9 Transporter-18	SLC-4E
31	MikroGLOB 3	2026-227BJ	Earth Observation	Ministry of National Defence, Creotech	1 October 2026	Falcon 9 Transporter-18	SLC-4E
32	MikroGLOB 4	2026-227AG	Earth Observation	Ministry of National Defence, Creotech	1 October 2026	Falcon 9 Transporter-18	SLC-4E

Future
Name	Purpose	Consortium	Launch date	Launch vehicle	Launch site
PW-Sat3	Technology demonstration	Warsaw University of Technology, KP Labs	2026	RFA One	SaxaVord
ICEYE-X? (MikroSAR 5)	Earth Observation	Ministry of National Defence, ICEYE	2027		
ICEYE-X? (MikroSAR 6)	Earth Observation	Ministry of National Defence, ICEYE	2027		
Poleos 1	Earth Observation	Ministry of National Defence	2027		
Poleos 2	Earth Observation	Ministry of National Defence	2027		
CAMILA 1	Earth Observation	ESA, Creotech	2027		
CAMILA 2	Earth Observation	ESA, Creotech	2027		
CAMILA 3	Earth Observation	ESA, Creotech	2027		
CAMILA 4	Earth Observation	ESA, Creotech	2027		
SAWA	Space weather	ESA, Creotech	2028		

== Gallery ==
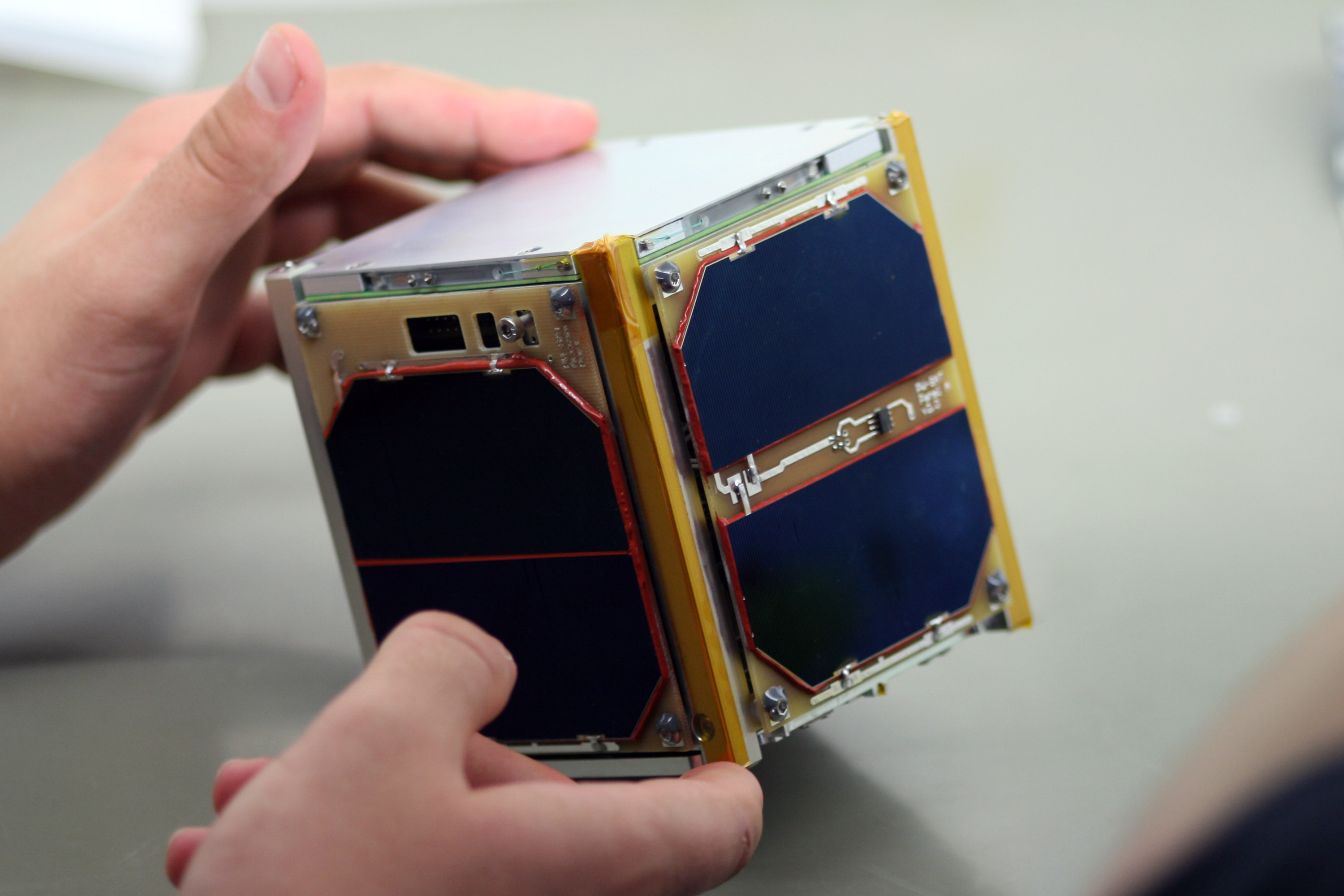
PW-Sat

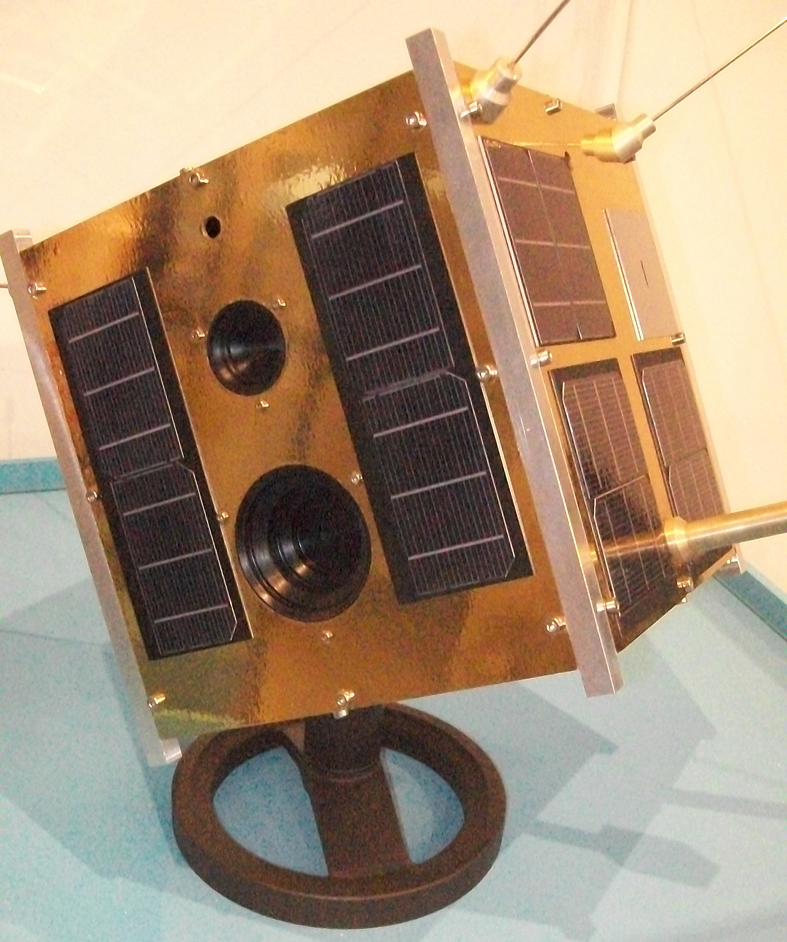
Lem

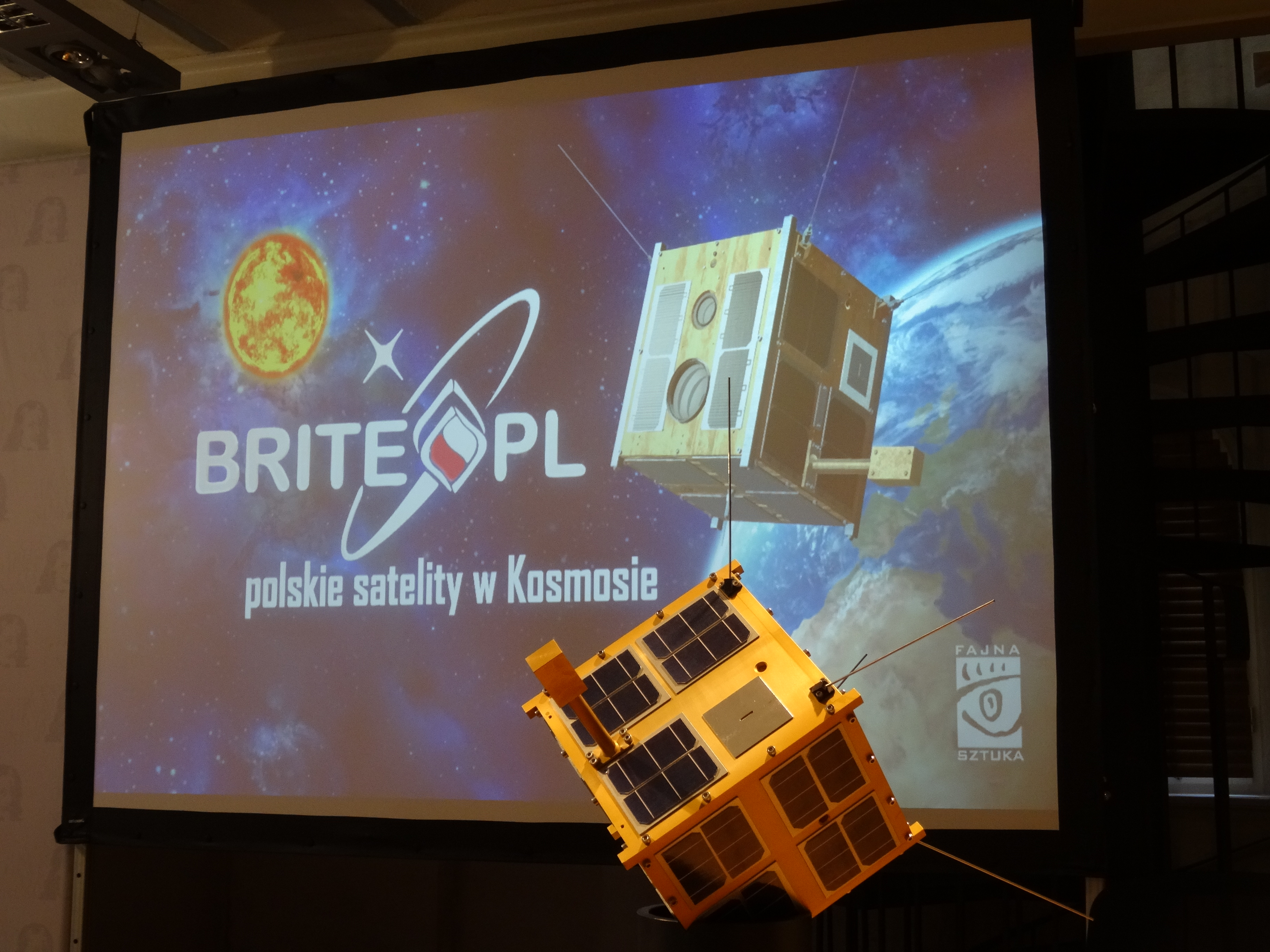
Heweliusz

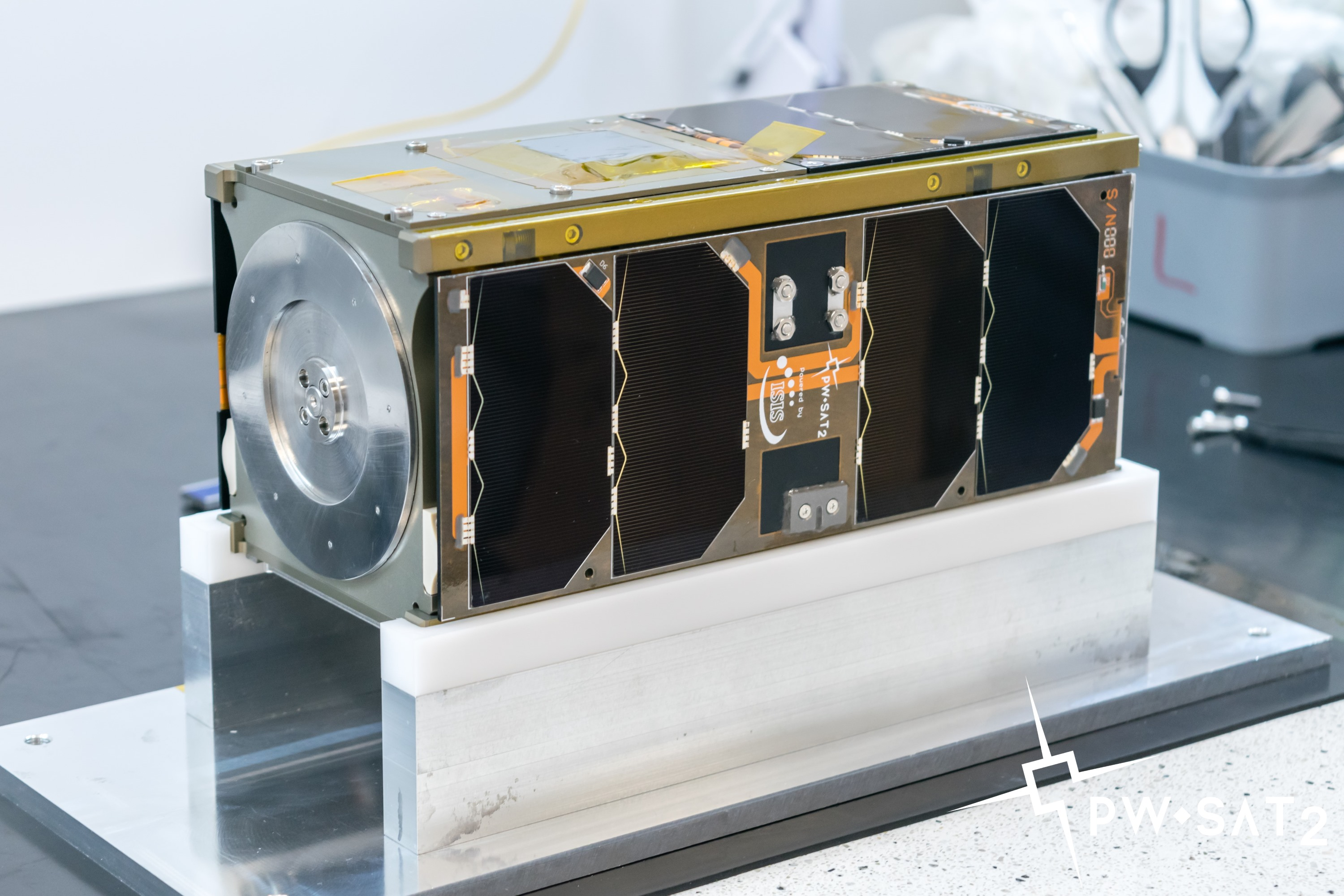
PW-Sat2

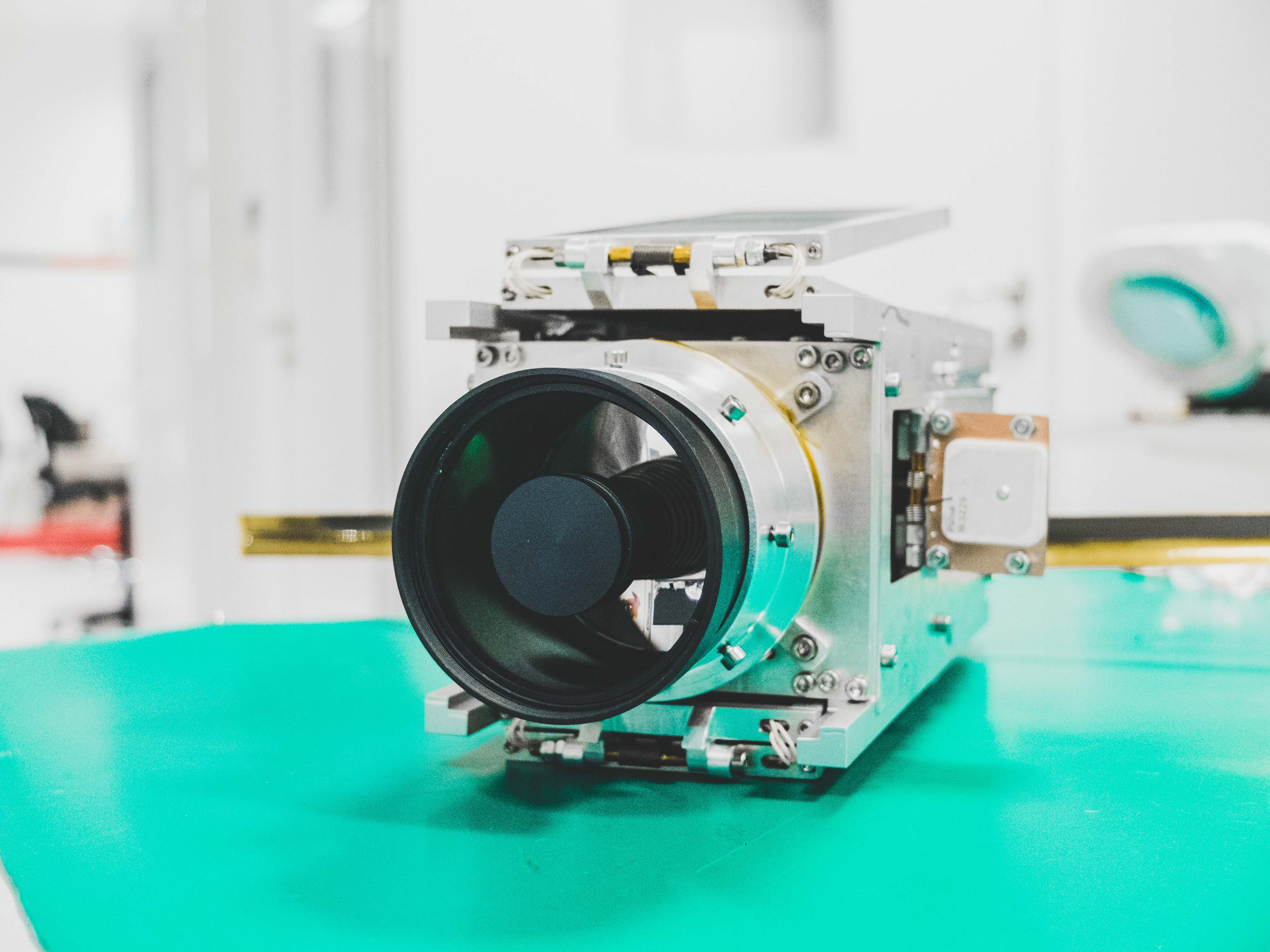
Światowid

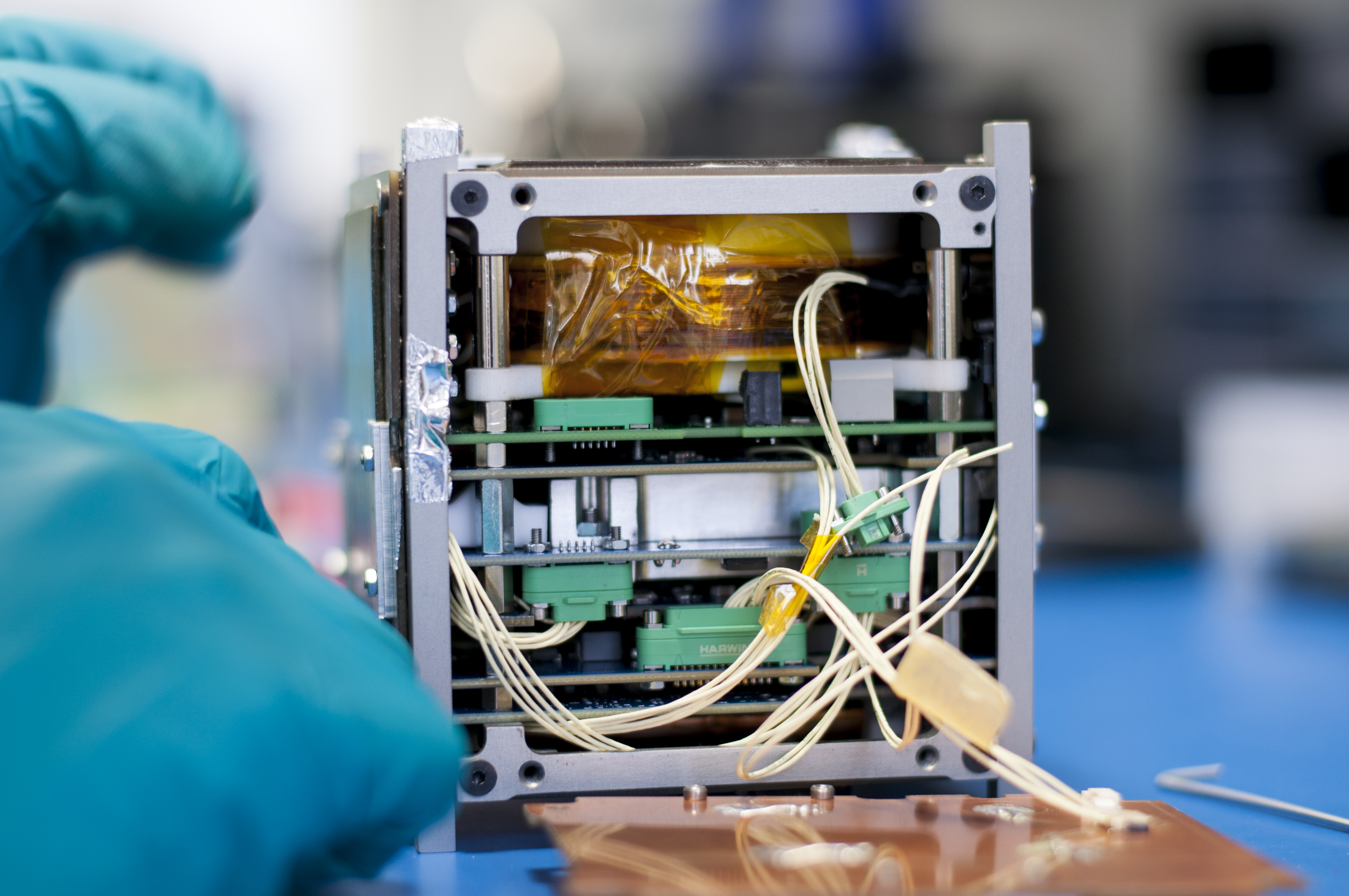
KRAKSAT

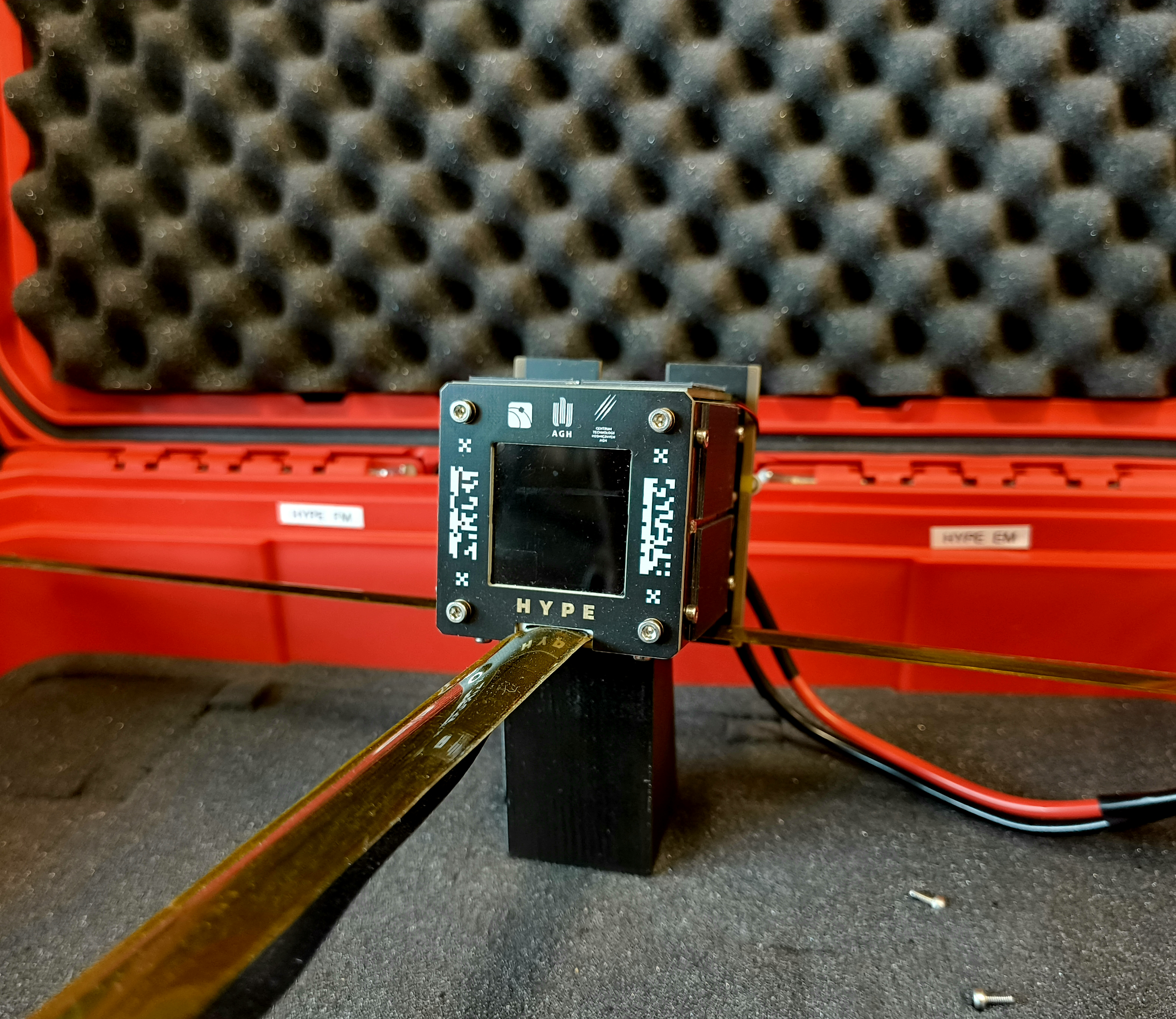
HYPE

== See also ==
- List of Czech satellites
- List of Slovak satellites
- List of Slovenian satellites
- List of Ukrainian satellites
