= PSLV-C37 =

39th mission of the PSLV space-rocket program

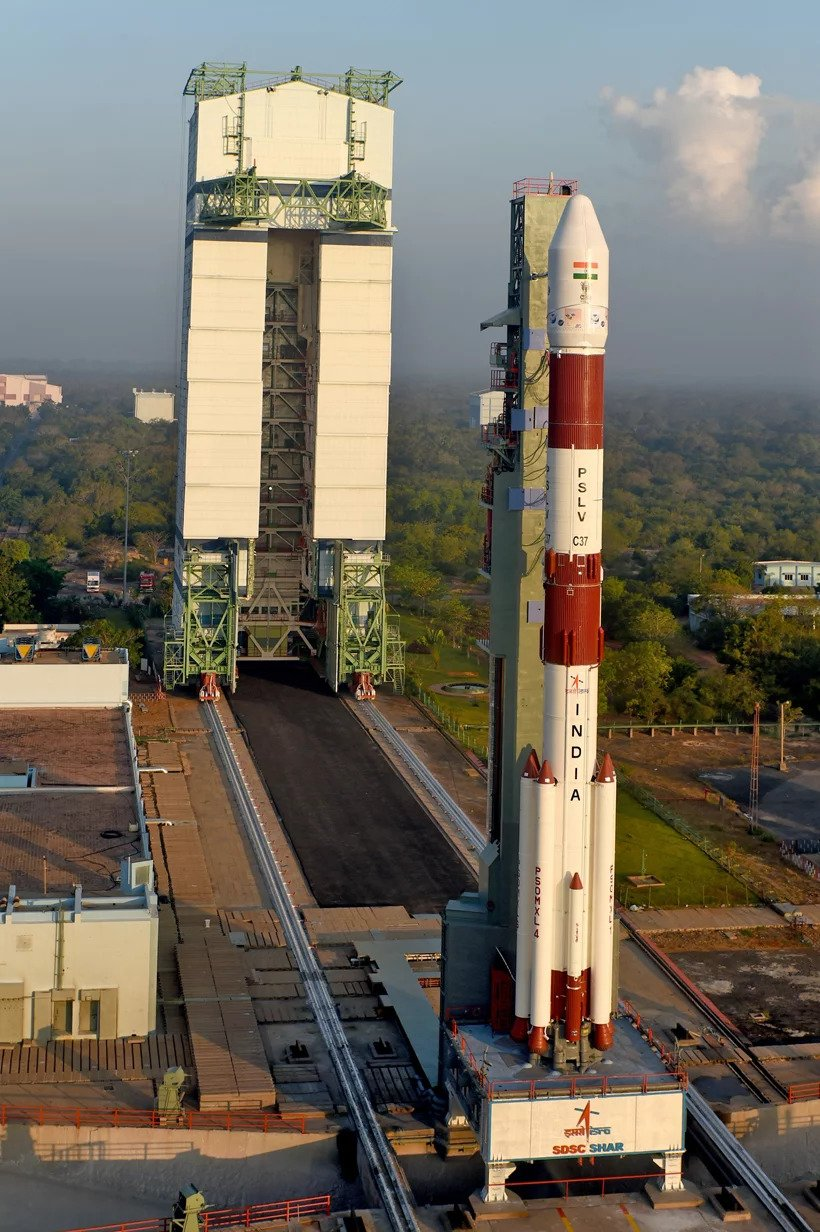
- The PSLV-XL launch vehicle rolled out at Sriharikota First, prior to flight C37

PSLV-XL launch
- Launch: 14 February 2017, 03:58:00 UTC
- Operator: ISRO
- Pad: Sriharikota First
- Payload: 104 satellites: Al Farabi-1; BGUSAT; Cartosat-2D; DIDO-2; Doves (Flock 3p); INS-1A; INS-1B; LEMUR Nano; Nayif-1; PEASSS
- Outcome: Success

PSLV launches

PSLV-C37 was the 37th mission of the Indian Polar Satellite Launch Vehicle (PSLV) program and its 16th mission in the XL configuration undertaken by the Indian Space Research Organisation (ISRO). Launched on 14 February 2017 from the Satish Dhawan Space Centre at Sriharikota, Andhra Pradesh, the rocket successfully carried and deployed a record number of 104 satellites in Sun-synchronous orbits in a single mission, breaking the earlier record of launching 37 satellites by a Russian Dnepr rocket on 19 June 2014. This record was held until the launch of the Transporter-1 mission by SpaceX on 24 January 2021 which launched 143 satellites.

Its primary payload was the Cartosat-2D Earth observation satellite, while the secondary payloads included a total of 103 nanosatellites, including two experiments from ISRO. The 101 international satellites were launched as part of a commercial arrangement between several firms and ISRO's commercial arm Antrix Corporation Limited, run under the auspices of the Indian Government's Department of Space.

== Launch ==
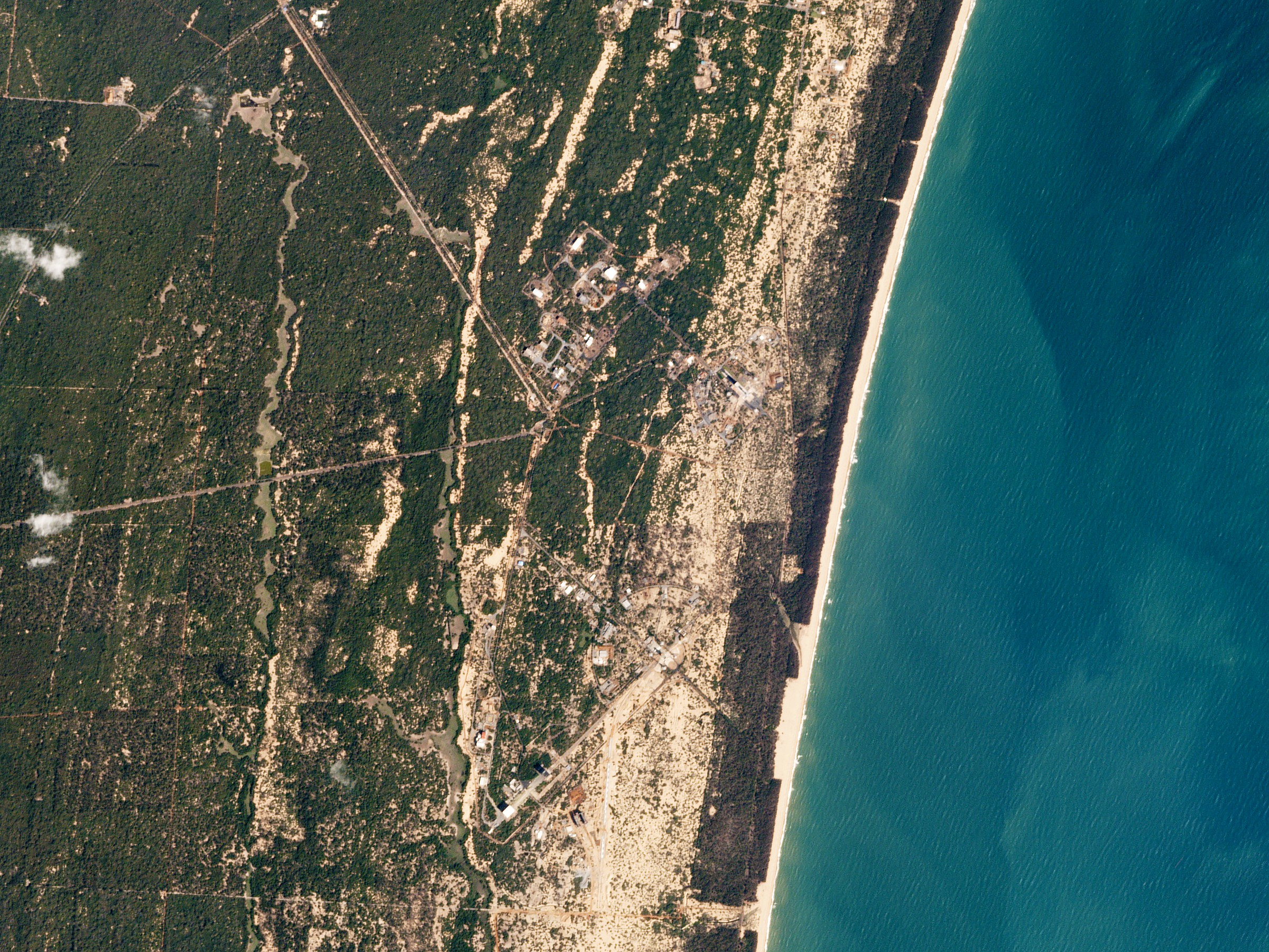
The Satish Dhawan Space Centre in Sriharikota, India, imaged by a Dove cubesat two days before the scheduled, record-setting PSLV-C37 launch

PSLV-C37 was launched from the First Launch Pad of Satish Dhawan Space Centre in Sriharikota at 09:28 IST on 15 February 2017. It was the 39th flight of the PSLV and the sixteenth in the XL configuration. It carried a total of 104 satellites including the primary payload Cartosat-2D. The launcher started placing the satellites into polar Sun-synchronous orbits one after another after a flight of 16 minutes and 48 seconds. It first ejected the satellite Cartosat-2D at an altitude of approximately 510 kilometres (320 mi), with 97.46 degrees inclination, followed by the two ISRO nanosatellites INS-1A and INS-1B. It then took 11 minutes for PSLV C-37 to place the remaining 101 "co-passenger" satellites into their intended orbits.

Soon after separation from the launch vehicle, the two solar arrays on board the Cartosat-2D satellite were automatically deployed. Afterwards, ISRO's Telemetry, Tracking and Command Network at Bengaluru took control of the satellite. "In the coming days, the satellite will be brought to its final operational configuration following which it will begin to provide remote sensing services using its panchromatic (black and white) and multispectral (colour) cameras," an ISRO statement read. The mission lasted 29 minutes.

Originally, PSLV-C37 was set to launch on 27 January 2017 with 83 satellites. With the addition of twenty more satellites to the payload, the schedule was changed to 15 February 2017.

On October 6 2024, the upper stage of the rocket (PS4) Re-entered the atmosphere at about 15:48:25 UTC. The corresponding impact point is located in the North Atlantic Ocean, off the coast of Cuba.

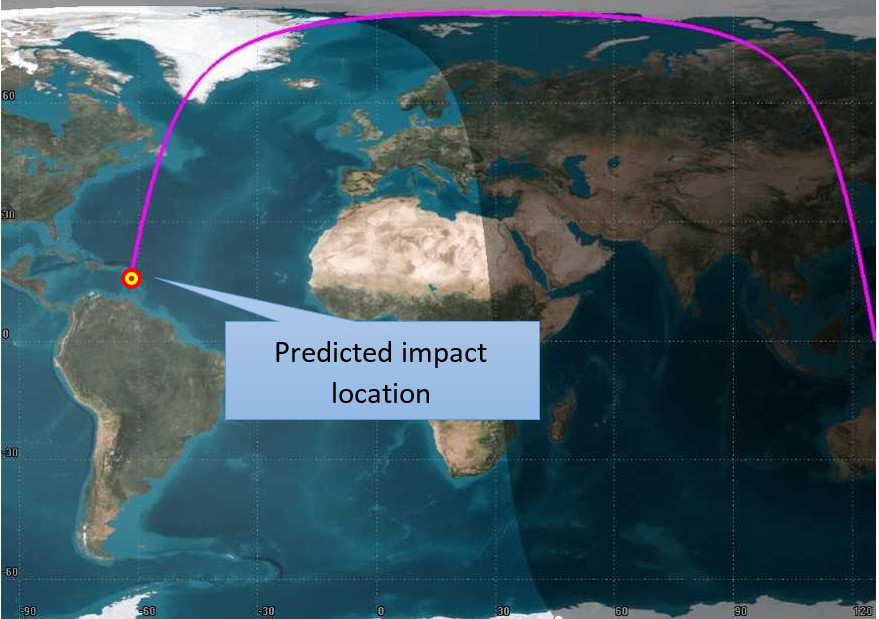
This map shows the last orbital track and the final impact point of the PS4 Stage of the PSLV-C37 mission

== Mission overview ==
- Mass:
  - Total liftoff weight: 320,000 kilograms (710,000 lb)
  - Payload weight: 1,378 kilograms (3,038 lb)
- Overall height: 44.4 metres (145.7 ft)
- Propellant:
  - Stage 1: Solid HTPB based
  - Stage 2: Liquid UH 25 + N_{2}O_{4}
  - Stage 3: Solid HTPB based
  - Stage 4: Liquid MMH + MON-3
- Altitude: 505 kilometres (314 mi)
- Maximum velocity: 7,609.52 metres per second (24,966 ft/s) (recorded at time of Cartosat-2D separation)
- Inclination: 97.46°
- Period: 94.72 minutes
- Launch azimuth: 140°

The rocket launched Cartosat-2D and 103 nanosatellites: two from India, one each from Kazakhstan, Israel, the Netherlands, Switzerland, and the United Arab Emirates, along with 96 from the United States – 88 Dove satellites and 8 LEMUR satellites. The three Indian satellites launched were Cartosat-2D, INS-1A, and INS-1B. Arrangements for the launch of the 104 satellites were made between ISRO's commercial arm Antrix Corporation Limited, under the auspices of the Indian Government's Department of Space, and the international customers.

The Cartosat-2D weighs 714 kilograms (1,574 lb), and its design life is five years. The two Indian nanosatellites, designated INS-1A and INS-1B, each carried two payloads from ISRO's Space Applications Centre and the Laboratory for Electro-Optics Systems. INS-1A carried a Surface Bidirectional Reflectance Distribution Function Radiometer (SBR) and a Single Event Upset Monitor (SEUM). INS-1B carried an Earth Exosphere Lyman-Alpha Analyzer (EELA) and Origami Camera as payloads. They weigh 8.4 kilograms (19 lb) and 9.7 kilograms (21 lb) respectively and have been designed with a mission life of six months. An ISRO official said: "The nano satellites are an experimental class of satellites introduced by ISRO because there are requests from academic institutions to use them for data collection. The universities do not have the knowledge to build satellites and tend to take a long time… We want them to focus on the instruments as we can provide the nano satellite bus."

The 103 co-passenger satellites weighed approximately 664 kilograms (1,464 lb), bringing the total payload mass to 1,378 kilograms (3,038 lb). The total launch mass of the rocket was 320,000 kilograms (710,000 lb). Among the 96 satellites belonging to US companies, 88 CubeSats were owned by Planet Labs, a private Earth imaging company based in San Francisco, California. Weighing roughly 5 kilograms (11 lb) each, the satellites separated from the rocket in different directions to avoid collision. With the launch of PSLV-C37, Planet Labs increased its fleet of satellites to 143, which was the largest private satellite fleet in operation at the time.

Eight Lemur-2 satellites belonging to Spire Global are to provide vessel tracking and weather measurement services. These satellites have a short lifetime of about two to three years requiring replacement at regular intervals.

PSLV-C37 used the rocket engine nozzle manufactured by Vijayawada, from Andhra Pradesh-based company Resins and Allied Productions (RAP). This is the 100th nozzle manufactured by RAP to be used in a PSLV. Several components of PSLV-C37 were manufactured by Larsen & Toubro at its advanced composite facility in Vadodara, Gujarat. The honeycomb deck panels used for mounting the heat shield and electronic packages on the upper stage of the PSLV, the antenna mount structure, and the 13 metres (14 yd) diameter bull gear were all manufactured by L&T.

== Cost ==
ISRO released a statement stating that it will recover half of the mission's cost from the foreign countries whose satellites it launched.

== Record ==
With this launch, ISRO created a new world record for the largest number of satellites ever launched on a single rocket, surpassing the previous record of Russia, which in 2014 launched 37 satellites using Dnepr rocket. This record set by ISRO stood until 24 January 2021, when SpaceX launched the Transporter-1 mission on a Falcon 9 rocket carrying 143 satellites into orbit.

== Usage ==
Imagery from the primary satellite, Cartosat-2D, is used for various land information system and geographical information system applications in India. Data collected by the two Indian nanosatellites—the INS-1A and INS-1B—will be used by ISRO's Space Applications Centre and the Laboratory for Electro-Optics Systems. The Dove satellites from the US are used to photograph the Earth for commercial, environmental, and humanitarian purposes. Eight LEMUR satellites, weighing 4.6 kilograms (10 lb) each, carried two different payloads, namely SENSE for vessel tracking purposes and STRATOS for atmospheric measurements. Al Farabi-1 satellite built by the students of Al-Farabi Kazakh National University, Nayif-1 satellite built by the Mohammed bin Rashid Space Centre, Dubai, and PEASSS satellite built by an all-European consortium of Partners, are technology demonstrator satellites whereas DIDO-2 built by SpacePharma from Switzerland is a micro-research satellite. BGUSAT (Ben Gurion University SATellite) built by Israel Aerospace Industries (IAI) in cooperation with Ben Gurion University is designed as a research satellite. The satellites objectives are to explore atmospheric and weather phenomena in the infrared wavelength by imaging atmospheric gaseous contents and atmospheric glow.
