= BlueBon =

Polish Cubesat with South Korean payload

- A rendering of BlueBon
- Mission type: Earth Observation
- Operator: SatRev
- COSPAR ID: 2025-009CH
- Website: satrev.space

Spacecraft properties
- Spacecraft type: 6U Cubesat
- Manufacturer: SatRev; TelePIX; Ministry of Science and ICT; POLSA

Start of mission
- Launch date: 14 January 2025, 19:09:00 UTC
- Rocket: Falcon 9
- Launch site: Vandenberg SCL-4
- Contractor: SpaceX Transporter-12

Orbital parameters
- Regime: LEO
- Apogee altitude: 525 kilometres (326 mi)
- Inclination: SSO
- Patch of the Deep Blue mission, the BlueBon's launch

BlueBON is a 6U Cubesat designed and built by the South Korean satellite company TelePIX in conjunction with the Ministry of Science and ICT alongside Polish firm SatRev overseen by POLSA, which launched on board the SpaceX Falcon9 Transporter-12.

== Development ==
Owned by TelePIX, BlueBON is the world’s first satellite dedicated to monitoring blue carbon in the ocean. This 6U Earth observation satellite is equipped with an AI-powered on-board processor that captures and analyzes electro-optical data directly in space. By processing imagery onboard, BlueBON dramatically reduces both the latency and carbon footprint associated with traditional Earth-based processing It was described as the world's first satellite with the mission to detect monitor and quantify blue carbon using an AI processing unit and proprietary algorithms to enable the satellite's imagery to be processed and analyzed in space before being sent down to earth, therefore lowering the carbon emissions from data processing.

BlueBON's payload won the 2024 Consumer Technology Association innovation award. BlueBON was also shown off at the International Astronautical Congress in Milan in 2024.

TelePIX signed the deal with SatRev to supply satellite imagery data. The contract was made during the ceremony held at the International Astronautical Congress(IAC) held in Baku, Azerbaijan. The event saw participation from both companies and representatives from the South Korean Ministry of Science and ICT, the Korea Aerospace Research Institute, the Polish Ministry of Economic Development and Technology, and the Polish Space Agency.

== Payload ==
The BlueBON has the 4.8m multispectral optical payload that can detect and estimate the amount of blue carbon in the ocean from floating algaes such as sargassums. TelePIX's proprietary algorithm can detect the locations of the algaes in the ocean.

BlueBON also has the AI on-board processor called "TetraPLEX" based on using NVIDIA's Jetson Orin GPU. TetraPLEX is a GPU-based edge computing solution capable of independently performing AI-based image analysis within the satellite. It reduces the processing time for 0.5m-class high-resolution satellite data, which previously took over 6 minutes, to about 11 seconds, allowing for real-time satellite image analysis. The processor was designed to eliminate carbon emissions and reduce data latency while still performing a high quality analysis.

== Mission ==
BlueBON was launched into space on January 14 (local time) from Vandenberg Space Force Base in California, carried aboard a SpaceX Falcon 9 rocket as part of the 'Transporter-12' mission. The launched BlueBON was successfully deployed on January 22, with its basic functions such as power and communication operating normally, and it has successfully established contact with the ground station. Data received as of January 27 confirmed that Bluebon has successfully entered its mission orbit.

== See also ==
- List of Polish satellites
