= ESAIL =

European satellite for maritime tracking

- Mission type: Maritime tracking
- Operator: European Space Agency (Luxembourg) Luxspace (Canada) exactEarth
- COSPAR ID: 2020-061B
- SATCAT no.: 46273

Start of mission
- Launch date: 3 September 2020
- Rocket: Vega flight VV16
- Launch site: Guiana Space Centre

End of mission
- Decay date: 3 March 2025

Orbital parameters
- Reference system: Geocentric
- Regime: Sun-synchronous
- Altitude: 515 km

ESAIL was a small satellite developed by the European Space Agency (ESA) in partnership with LuxSpace and ExactEarth.

== History ==
Its objective was worldwide tracking of ships using their automatic identification systems (AIS) for fisheries monitoring, fleet management, environmental protection, and security monitoring.

The satellite was launched in September 2020 on the Vega flight VV16 from Guiana Space Centre.

In a record-breaking technology demonstration, the satellite managed to process more than 2,000,000 messages from 70,000 different ships in a single day, representing a 15% to 20% improvement over previous satellites.

== See also ==
- List of European Space Agency programmes and missions
