= BGUSAT =

Israeli research satellite

- BGUSAT satellite mission patch
- Mission type: Earth observation Technology
- Operator: ISA/Ben-Gurion University of the Negev
- COSPAR ID: 2017-008BD
- SATCAT no.: 41999
- Website: wwwee.ee.bgu.ac.il/~bgusat/menu_bar.htm
- Mission duration: 6 years and 9 days

Spacecraft properties
- Manufacturer: IAI; Ben-Gurion University of the Negev
- Launch mass: 5 kilograms (11 lb)
- Dimensions: 30 × 10 × 10 cm (3U cubesat)

Start of mission
- Launch date: 15 February 2017, 03:58 UTC
- Rocket: PSLV-C37
- Launch site: Sriharikota Launching Range
- Contractor: ISRO
- Entered service: 15 February 2017, 03:58 UTC

End of mission
- Decay date: 24 February 2023

Orbital parameters
- Reference system: Geocentric
- Regime: LEO
- Perigee altitude: 505 km
- Apogee altitude: 505 km

BGUSAT was an Israeli research CubeSat built by the IAI and Ben Gurion University.

== Mission ==
BGUSAT was a research satellite designed to explore atmospheric and weather phenomena in infra-red wavelengths, analyzing atmospheric gaseous contents and atmospheric glow. As a student research satellite, it allowed the students to gain experience with the development and integration of a nano-satellite.

== Satellite ==
The satellite was a basic 3U CubeSat (30 × 10 × 10 cm) with a mass of about 5 kg. The onboard computer was a GR712RC designed by Ramon Chips and Cobham Gaisle.

The camera payload was a small camera, working in the wavelength of IR and NIR 1.7 - 1.55 $\ [\mu m]$. The ground station was operated by the researchers and students of Ben Gurion University.

== History ==
Originally called NEGEVSAT, the project started as a Ben Gurion University student project in 2008. Originally planned as a 1U CubeSat (10 × 10 × 10 cm) the satellite was planned in conjunction of the Faculty of Engineering Sciences. The students worked on the design of the altitude and control system, the power system and ground station operations. After a few years, the project was put on hold due to lack of funding.

By 2013, the BGUSAT project was restarted. With the donation of Rachel and Max Javit from Connecticut, the satellite's design evolved to a 3U CubeSat (30 × 10 × 10 cm) with a small Earth observation camera. The donation allowed also for a small GPS and communication device and initial ground station operations. Collaboration with IAI to use their CubeSat bus platform and a new on board computer.

In addition, a sum of 1 Million NIS was dedicated by the Israeli Space Agency for research and image processing of the images received from the satellite.

BGUSAT was successfully launched on February 15, 2017, 03:58 UTC on PSLV-C37 on a record-breaking launch which released 104 satellites. The Israeli DIDO-2 nano-satellite was also launched in the same launch.

BGUSAT decayed from orbit on February 24, 2023.

== Mission patch ==
The mission patch was designed by Tal Inbar and Igal Gabai to look like the silhouette of the head of David Ben-Gurion, surrounded by an orange lining representing the Negev area. The satellite watches the Earth and Israel, while the blue glow represents the atmospheric studies. The constellation Columba (Dove in Hebrew) is shown representing peace as well as the launch date, February, in which Columba is clearly seen over the Israeli skies. The Israeli flag, Ben Gurion University's logo and the Israeli space agency's logos are clearly seen.

== See also ==
- 2017 in spaceflight
