= Cygnus NG-11 =

Mid-2019 cargo mission to the ISS

NG-11
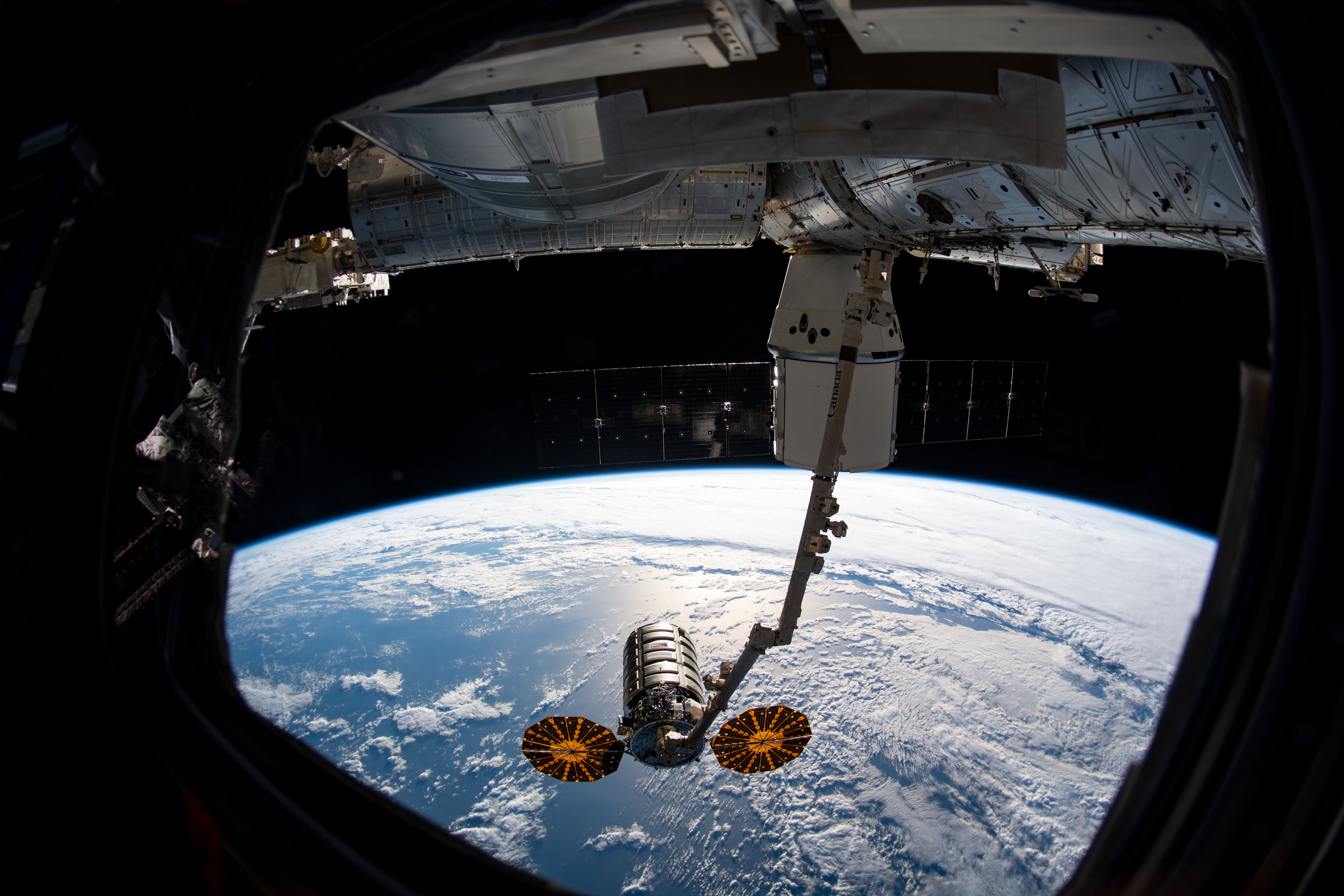
- Canadarm2 grapples the S.S. Roger Chaffee, while Dragon C108 is docked to Harmony.
- Names: CRS NG-11; CRS OA-11 (2016–2018)
- Mission type: ISS resupply
- Operator: Northrop Grumman
- COSPAR ID: 2019-022A
- SATCAT no.: 44188
- Mission duration: 232 days, 18 hours, 42 minutes

Spacecraft properties
- Spacecraft: S.S. Roger Chaffee
- Spacecraft type: Enhanced Cygnus
- Manufacturer: Northrop Grumman; Thales Alenia Space

Start of mission
- Launch date: 17 April 2019, 20:46:07 UTC (4:46:07 pm EDT)
- Rocket: Antares 230
- Launch site: MARS, Pad 0A

End of mission
- Disposal: Deorbited
- Decay date: 6 December 2019, 15:28 UTC

Orbital parameters
- Reference system: Geocentric orbit
- Regime: Low Earth orbit
- Inclination: 51.66°

Berthing at ISS
- Berthing port: Unity nadir
- RMS capture: 19 April 2019, 09:28 UTC
- Berthing date: 19 April 2019, 11:31 UTC
- Unberthing date: 6 August 2019, 13:30 UTC
- RMS release: 6 August 2019, 16:15 UTC
- Time berthed: 109 days, 1 hour, 59 minutes

Cargo
- Mass: 3,436 kg (7,575 lb)
- Pressurised: 3,162 kg (6,971 lb)
- Unpressurised: 239 kg (527 lb)
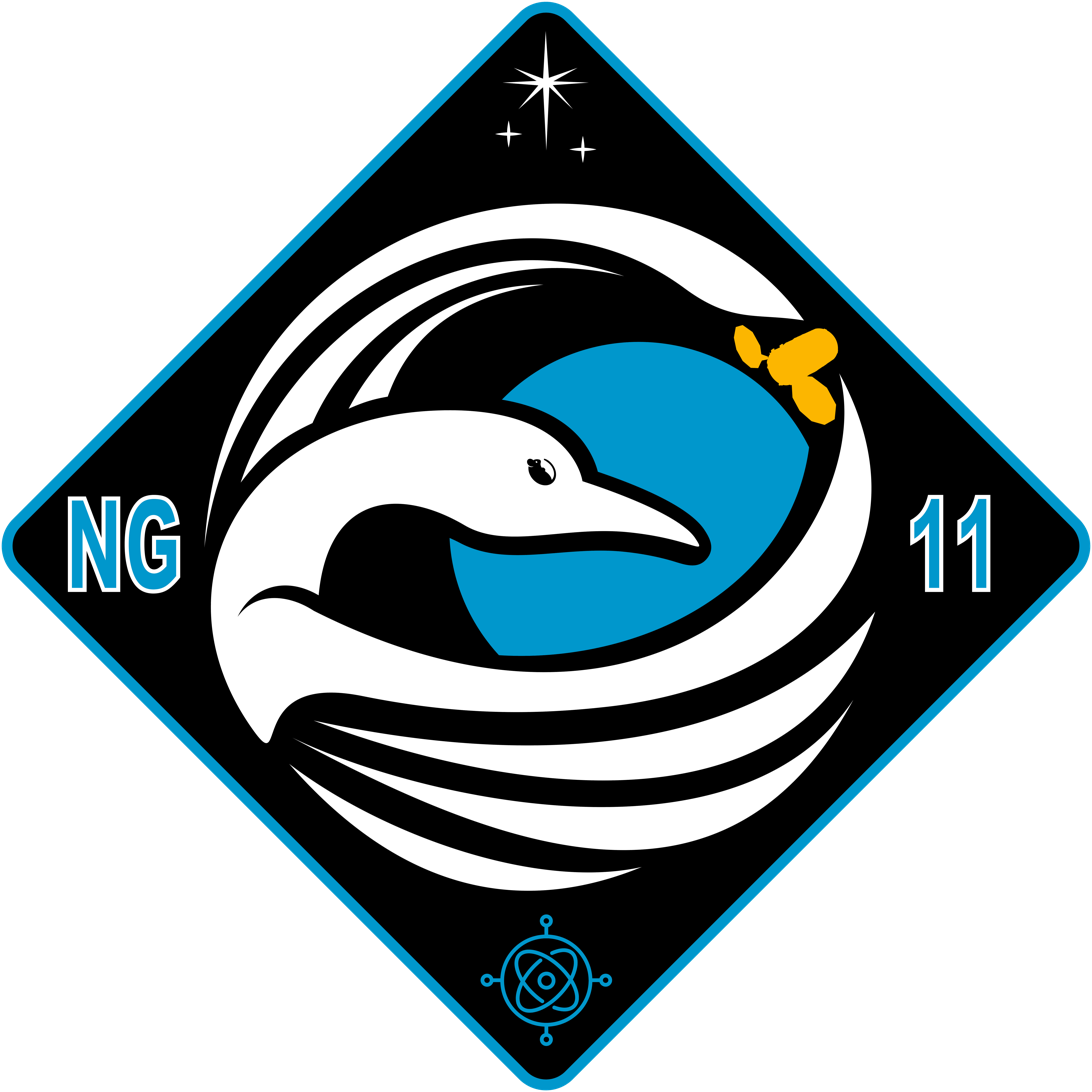
- NASA insignia Commercial Resupply Services Cygnus flights

NG-11, previously known as OA-11, is the twelfth flight of the Northrop Grumman robotic resupply spacecraft Cygnus and its eleventh flight to the International Space Station under the Commercial Resupply Services (CRS-1) contract with NASA. The mission launched on 17 April 2019 at 20:46:07 UTC. This is the last mission from the extended CRS-1 (phase 1) contract; follow-up missions are part of the CRS-2 contract. Cygnus NG-11 was also the first mission to load critical hardware onto Cygnus within the last 24 hours prior to launch, a new Antares feature.

Orbital ATK and NASA jointly developed a new space transportation system to provide commercial cargo resupply services to the International Space Station (ISS). Under the Commercial Orbital Transportation System (COTS) program, then Orbital Sciences designed and built Antares, a medium-class launch vehicle; Cygnus, an advanced maneuvering spacecraft, and a Pressurized Cargo Module which is provided by Orbital's industrial partner Thales Alenia Space. Northrop Grumman purchased Orbital in June 2018; its ATK division was renamed Northrop Grumman Innovation Systems.

Concurrently, Nepalese satellite NepaliSat-1 and Sri Lankan satellite Raavana 1 were launched as part of Cygnus NG-11 as deployable payloads.

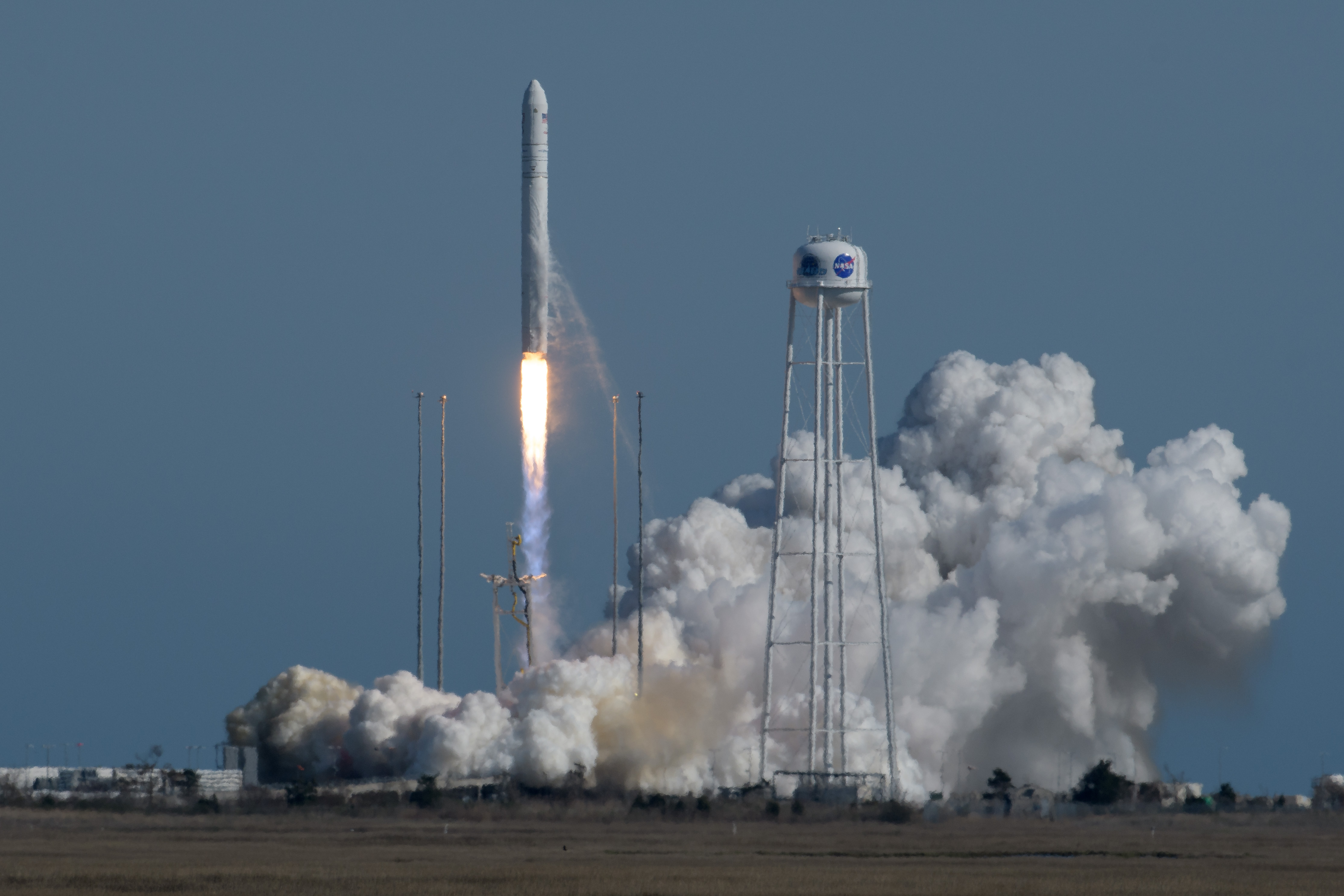
Northrop Grumman launches the Cygnus NG-11 mission.

== History ==
Cygnus NG-11 is part of an extension program that enables NASA to cover the ISS resupply needs until the Commercial Resupply Services 2 contract enters in effect. The mission launched on 17 April 2019, at 20:46:07 UTC from Wallops Island, Virginia.

== Spacecraft ==
Production and integration of Cygnus spacecraft is performed in Dulles, Virginia. The Cygnus service module is mated with the pressurized cargo module at the launch site, and mission operations are conducted from control centers in Dulles, Virginia and Houston, Texas. This will be the eighth flight of the Enhanced-sized Cygnus PCM.

The spacecraft for the NG-11 is named the S.S. Roger Chaffee after Roger Chaffee who lost his life during training for the Apollo 1 mission. On 17 April 2019 at 20:46:07 UTC, Antares launched the NG-11 mission to the International Space Station from Wallops Island, Virginia.

== Manifest ==
Total weight of cargo: 3,436 kg (7,575 lb), consisting of 3,162 kg (6,971 lb) in pressurized cargo and 229 kg (505 lb) in unpressurized cargo.

- Crew supplies: 987 kg (2,176 lb)
- Science investigations: 1,569 kg (3,459 lb)
- Spacewalk equipment: 24 kg (53 lb)
- Vehicle hardware: 628 kg (1,385 lb)
- Computer resources: 4.5 kg (9.9 lb)
- Northrop Grumman-related equipment: 35 kg (77 lb)

Smallsats deployed during NG-11:

- AeroCube 10A (JimSat) and 10B (DougSat) by The Aerospace Corporation
- Aeternitas, Ceres, and Libertas, three CubeSats in the Virginia CubeSat Constellation, launched as part of NASA's ELaNa-26 mission, developed by Old Dominion University, Virginia Tech, and the University of Virginia, respectively.
- EntrySat
- IOD-1 GEMS (In-Orbit Demonstration - Global Environmental Monitoring Satellite)
- KRAKSAT, a CubeSat created by Polish students from AGH University of Science and Technology and Jagiellonian University
- SASSI^{2} (Student Aerothermal Spectrometer Satellite of Illinois and Indiana)
- Seeker, a free-flying NASA CubeSat for vehicle inspection
- SpooQy 1
- Światowid, a CubeSat by SatRevolution
- 60 × ThinSats in 12 strings, experimental miniature satellites built by school children and university students
- Uguisu, Raavana 1, and NepaliSat-1, 1U CubeSats developed by students in Japan, Sri Lanka, and Nepal, respectively, as part of the BIRDS-3 project

New hardware, known as the Thermal Amine Scrubber, the first Exploration ECLSS Tech Demonstration aboard ISS, which will be activated in April 2019 and scrub additional CO_{2} from the ISS atmosphere.

== See also ==
- Uncrewed spaceflights to the International Space Station
