= Eycore-1 =

Polish synthetic-aperture radar satellite

- Mission type: Dual-use SAR
- Operator: (Poland) Eycore
- COSPAR ID: 2026-100U

Spacecraft properties
- Bus: MP42 microsatellite

Start of mission
- Launch date: 3 May 2026, 7:00 UTC
- Rocket: Falcon 9 CAS500-2 rideshare mission

Eycore-1 is an Earth observation satellite developed by the Polish company Eycore. It is the first Polish satellite using domestically developed Synthetic Aperture Radar (SAR) technology. The spacecraft is based on the MP42 satellite bus developed by the Lithuanian company NanoAvionics. Eycore's mother company, Advanced Protection Systems (APS), is a manufacturer of military anti-drone systems. The satellite is designed to support both military and civilian applications. Eycore-1 was launched on 3 May 2026 on the Falcon 9's CAS500-2 rideshare mission. This made Eycore the second European private company to own its own SAR satellite.

== See also ==
- List of Polish satellites
