= TriSat =

Slovenian satellite series

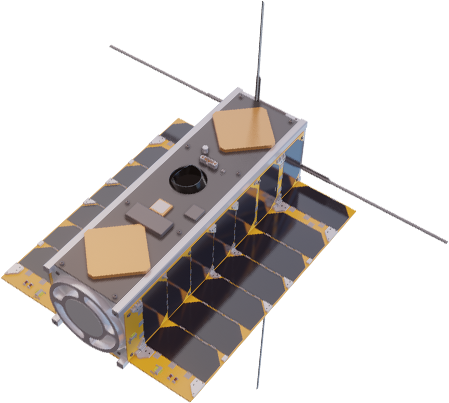
- TriSat satellite
- Designer: University of Maribor
- Country of origin: Slovenia
- Website: trisat.um.si

Specifications
- Spacecraft type: CubeSat

Production
- Built: 3
- Launched: 3
- Maiden launch: 3 September 2020
- Last launch: 5 September 2026

The TriSat satellite series comprises three CubeSat-type nanosatellites developed by the University of Maribor and the company SkyLabs in Slovenia with the support of the European Space Agency (ESA). The satellites support the education of students at the University of Maribor, explore the radiation environment around Earth, and test new spaceflight technologies.

== Satellites ==
The first spacecraft of the series, TriSat, was launched to low Earth orbit in September 2020 Vega flight VV16 together with another Slovenian satellite named Nemo HD, as the first two space missions of Slovenia. The satellite was testing a miniaturized multispectral optical payload for Earth observation in short wave infrared spectrum and high-throughput S-BAND communication equipment. Due to high solar activity, the satellite de-orbited a year earlier than planned – on 29 September 2024.

The second spacecraft, TriSat-R, was launched to medium Earth orbit in July 2022 on Vega-C. It carried a radiation measuring instrument developed in cooperation with CERN that was used for studying ionizing radiation in the environment of the Van Allen Belts. TriSat-R also tested two miniaturized cameras, only 2 mm across, which successfully took a picture of Earth from 6,000 km away.

The third spacecraft, TriSat-S, was launch in September 2026 on Isar Aerospace's Spectrum rocket. It was designed to test battery hibernation technologies and miniaturized imaging-based navigation. The satellite carries six miniature cameras pointing in all directions that are used for developing optical navigation technologies.

== See also ==
- List of Slovenian satellites
