= List of Slovenian satellites =

This list covers all artificial satellites built or operated by institutions or companies from Slovenia since the country's independence in 1991.

Launched
#	Name	COSPAR ID	Purpose	Consortium	Launch date	Launch vehicle	Launch site	Ref
1	Nemo HD	2020-061F	Earth observation	Space Flight Laboratory, Space‑SI	3 September 2020	Vega	Kourou, ELV	
2	TriSat	2020-061J	Technology demonstration	University of Maribor, ESA, SkyLabs	3 September 2020	Vega	Kourou, ELV	
3	TriSat-R	2022-080D	Van Allen Belts research	University of Maribor, ESA, SkyLabs, CERN	13 July 2022	Vega-C	Kourou, ELV	
4	TriSat-S	2026-203D	Technology demonstration	University of Maribor, ESA, SkyLabs	5 September 2026	Spectrum	Andøya Spaceport	

== See also ==
- List of Czech satellites
- List of Polish satellites
- List of Slovak satellites
- List of Ukrainian satellites
