= SIMBA (satellite) =

European climatology CubeSat satellite

- Mission type: Climatology
- Operator: ESA
- COSPAR ID: 2020-061H
- SATCAT no.: 46279

Spacecraft properties
- Spacecraft type: 3U CubeSat
- Manufacturer: Innovative Solutions In Space (Delft, Netherlands), KU Leuven, Royal Meteorological Institute of Belgium

Start of mission
- Launch date: 3 September 2020, 01:51:10 UTC
- Rocket: Vega, flight VV16
- Launch site: Guiana Space Centre

End of mission
- Declared: 31 December 2022
- Decay date: 14 August 2024

Orbital parameters
- Reference system: Geocentric
- Regime: Sun-synchronous
- Altitude: 530 km
- Inclination: 97.51 deg

SIMBA (Sun-earth IMBAlance) was a climatology satellite mission by the European Space Agency (ESA) in the form of a 3U CubeSat. Its goal was to help quantify how much heat from the Sun is being retained within Earth atmosphere. For this, SIMBA measured Earth's radiation budget and total solar irradiance using a miniaturized radiometer instrument. The satellite was launched in September 2020 aboard a Vega rocket and remained operational until December 2022. It deorbited in August 2024.

== See also ==
- List of European Space Agency programmes and missions
