= PIAST =

Polish military Earth observation satellites

- Rendering of PIAST constellation
- Mission type: Earth observation
- Operator: Polish Space Agency
- COSPAR ID: 2025-276

Spacecraft properties
- Spacecraft type: Satellite
- Manufacturer: Creotech

Start of mission
- Launch date: 28 November 2025, 10:44:00 UTC
- Rocket: Falcon 9 Transporter-15
- Launch site: Vandenberg SCL-4E
- Contractor: SpaceX
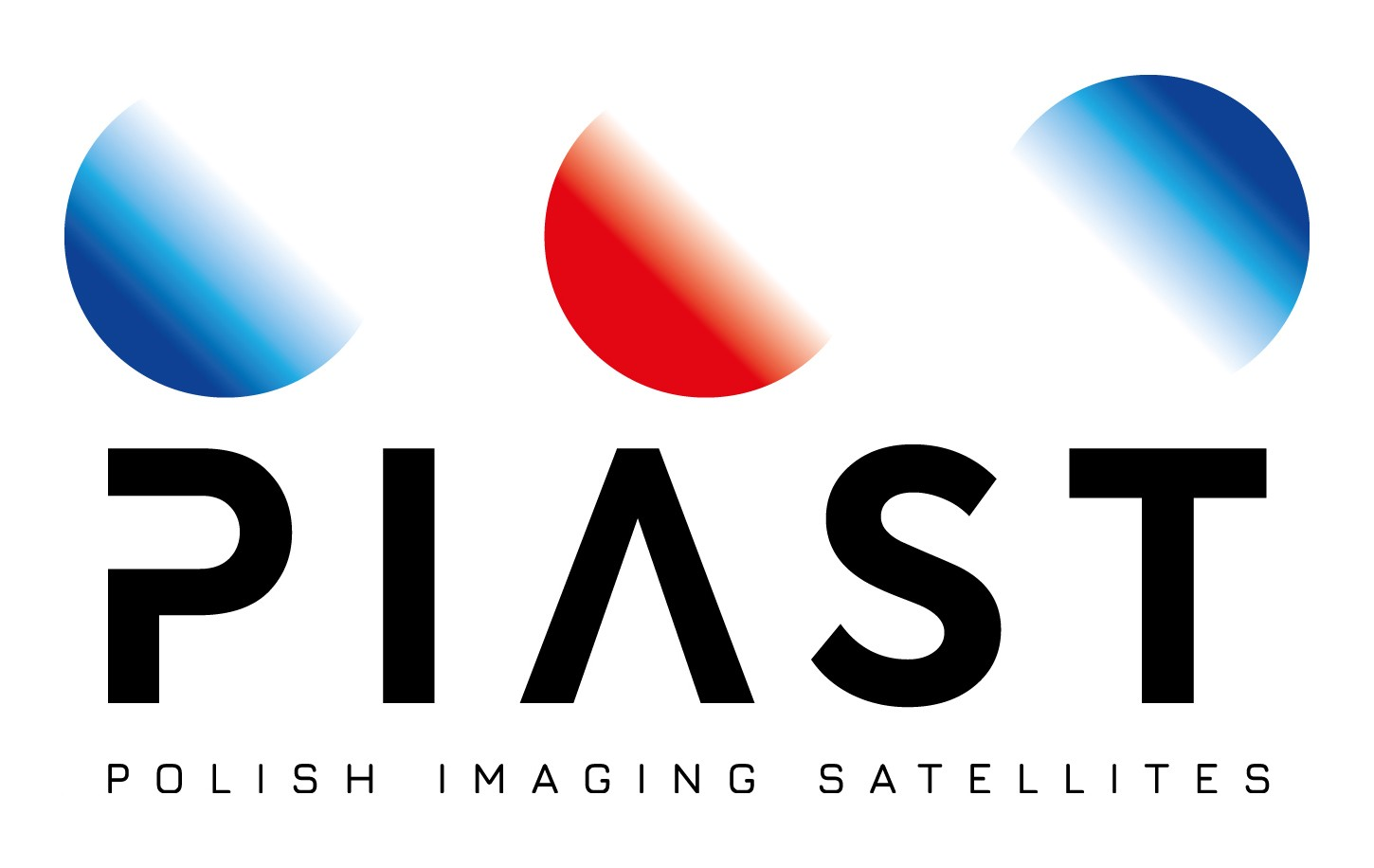
- Mission logo

The PIAST (Polish ImAging SaTelites) constellation is a group of three (PIAST-S1, PIAST-S2, PIAST-M) 6U nanosatellites developed by the Polish Ministry of National Defence and Polish Space Agency for Earth observation purposes that was launched on November 28, 2025 to low Earth orbit.

== Overview ==
The earth observation satellites are designed to be used to help targeting for JASSM-ER missiles or ATACMS missiles, to help coordinate forces on the ground, and to allow for better mission management. The constellation is part of the Szafir program, an effort by the Polish government to increase the connectivity and cooperation between scientific institutions and private firms. The satellite program is part of an effort by the Polish government to subsidize the domestic space industry to make it easier for future satellite development.

The PIAST satellites are also testing new laser communication devices, in order to develop a military communications system that can't be jammed. In place of traditional radio communication devices, the satellites communicate between each other with laser emitting diodes and receivers. The military expects that once the communication devices are proven to work, that they will begin adopting them both for military applications, but also civilian ones such as at data centers.

The constellation is named after the Piast dynasty, the first royal family of Poland. The spacecraft's body was constructed by Creotech on the basis of their HyperSat platform. Additionally, Creotech is using the same ion thrusters they developed for the EagleEye for the PIAST constellation. Scanway was responsible for the construction of two of the three high-resolution Earth Observation telescopes. Each satellite is designed to have a five-meter resolution.

== History ==
In October 2021 it was announced private space firms were hired to form a consortium led by the Jaroslaw Dabrowski Military University of Technology and consisting of Creotech instruments, PAN Centre for Space Research, Scanway Space, the Łukasiewicz Research Network – Institute of Aviation, PCO S.A. (a company owned by the Polish Armaments Group). The project cost zł70 million, 40% of which was allocated to Creotech for the manufacturing. When the project was announced it was reported it would take 48 months to develop, and would launch sometime in 2024.

In April 2023 it was announced by Creotech that PIAST had completed the Preliminary Design Review and that manufacturing and assembly of the satellites had begun and that launch was now expected to take place in 2025. In June 2024 it was announced Terma A/S was hired to deploy a full Mission Control Center for the satellites' operations.

PIAST was launched on board the SpaceX Falcon 9 Transporter-15 on November 28, 2025 alongside the announcement of a new Polish military satellite program MikroSAR which will be developed in consortium with a Finnish company ICEYE.

Two-way communication between the Earth and the constellation was established on November 30 and they returned their first image of Earth on December 6, 2025.

== Impact ==
The satellites where praised by the Polish Military with defense minister Władysław Kosiniak-Kamysz stating that their launch made Poland “the first [country] in Central and Eastern Europe with a comprehensive military satellite reconnaissance system.” He also stated that PIAST will enable the design and launch of further Polish spy-satellites.

== See also ==
- List of Polish satellites
