= Cartosat-2D =

Indian earth observation satellite

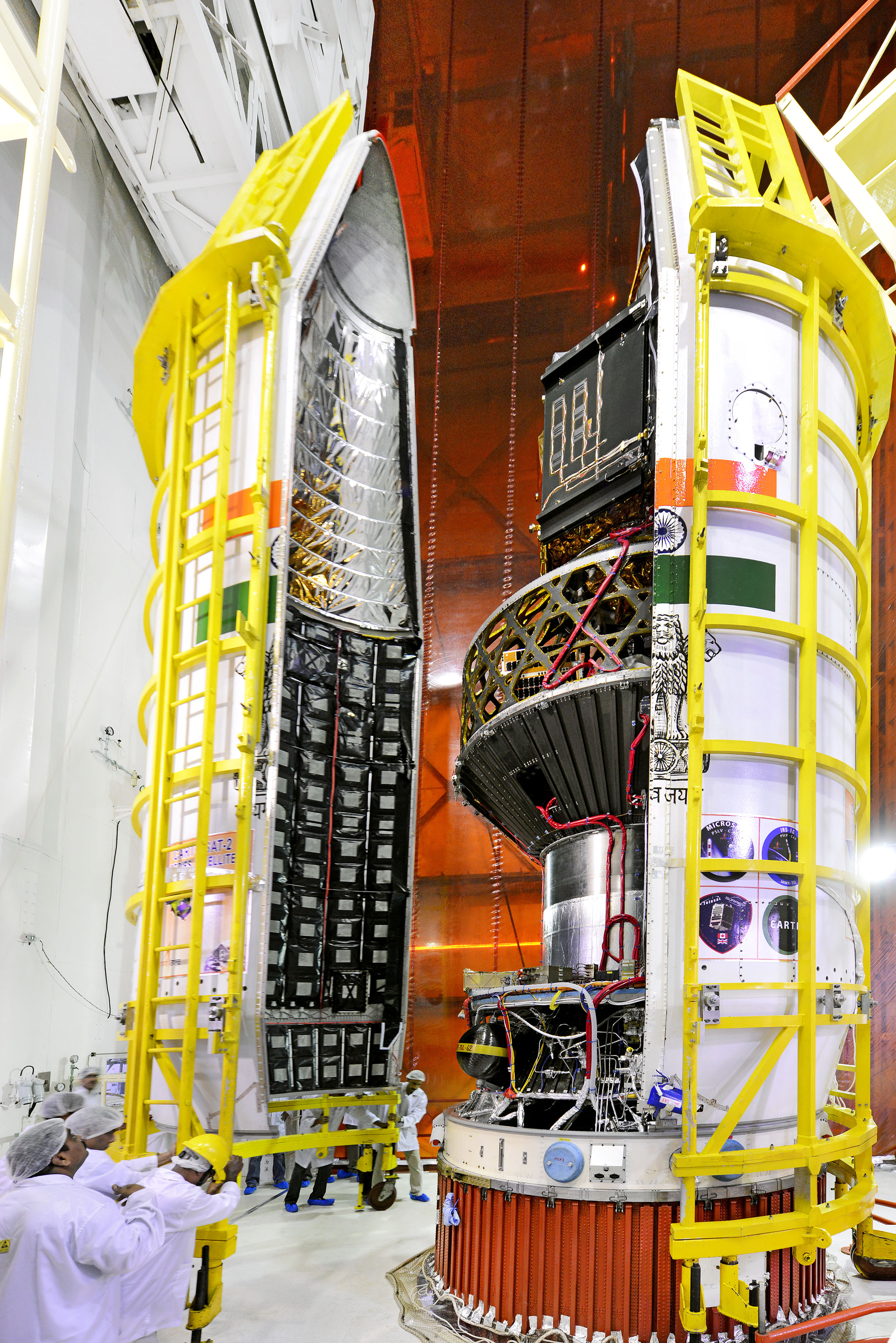
- Names: CartoSat-2D
- Mission type: Earth observation
- Operator: ISRO
- COSPAR ID: 2017-008A
- SATCAT no.: 41948
- Website: https://isro.gov.in/
- Mission duration: 5 years (planned); 8 years, 9 months and 24 days (in progress)

Spacecraft properties
- Spacecraft: CartoSat-2D
- Bus: IRS-2
- Manufacturer: Indian Space Research Organisation
- Launch mass: 714 kg (1,574 lb)
- Dimensions: 2.5 m in height 2.4 m in diameter
- Power: 986 watts

Start of mission
- Launch date: 15 February 2017, 03:58 UTC
- Rocket: Polar Satellite Launch Vehicle-XL, PSLV-C37
- Launch site: Satish Dhawan Space Centre, First Launch Pad (FLP)
- Contractor: Indian Space Research Organisation
- Entered service: 15 May 2017

Orbital parameters
- Reference system: Geocentric orbit
- Regime: Sun-synchronous orbit
- Perigee altitude: 504 km (313 mi)
- Apogee altitude: 512 km (318 mi)
- Inclination: 97.49°
- Period: 94.72 minutes
Instruments
- PAN: Panchromatic Camera
- HRMX: High-Resolution Multi-Spectral radiometer
- EvM: Event Monitoring camera

Cartosat-2D is an Earth observation satellite in a Sun-synchronous orbit (SSO) and the fifth of the Cartosat series of satellites. The satellite is built, launched and maintained by the Indian Space Research Organisation (ISRO). Cartosat-2D has a mass of 714 kg.

== Satellite description ==
The satellite achieves three-axis stabilization through a combination of reaction wheels, magnetorquers and hydrazine-fuelled reaction control thrusters. Power is generated by a pair of solar panels, charging two lithium-ion batteries. The solar panels generate 986 watts of power when in Sun-pointed mode. The satellite is outfitted with an eight-channel GPS receiver for the calculation of instantaneous state vectors and orbital parameters. GPS is also used for GEO-referencing of acquired imaging data.

== Instruments ==
The CartoSat-2D carries a panchromatic camera (PAN) capable of taking black-and-white pictures in the visible region of electromagnetic spectrum. It also carries a High-Resolution Multi-Spectral (HRMX) radiometer which is a type of optical imager. The satellite has a spatial resolution of 0.6 metres. CartoSat-2D is also capable of capturing minute long video of a fixed spot as well, Event Monitoring camera (EvM) for frequent high-resolution land observation of selected areas.

== Launch ==
It was launched by the Polar Satellite Launch Vehicle (PSLV), PSLV-C37, on 15 February 2017, at 03:58 UTC along with two Indian nanosatellites (INS-1A and INS-1B) and 101 nanosatellites belonging to research facilities in the United States, Kazakhstan, Israel, the Netherlands, Switzerland, and the United Arab Emirates.

== See also ==
- List of Indian satellites
