= Światowid (satellite) =

Earth observation satellite

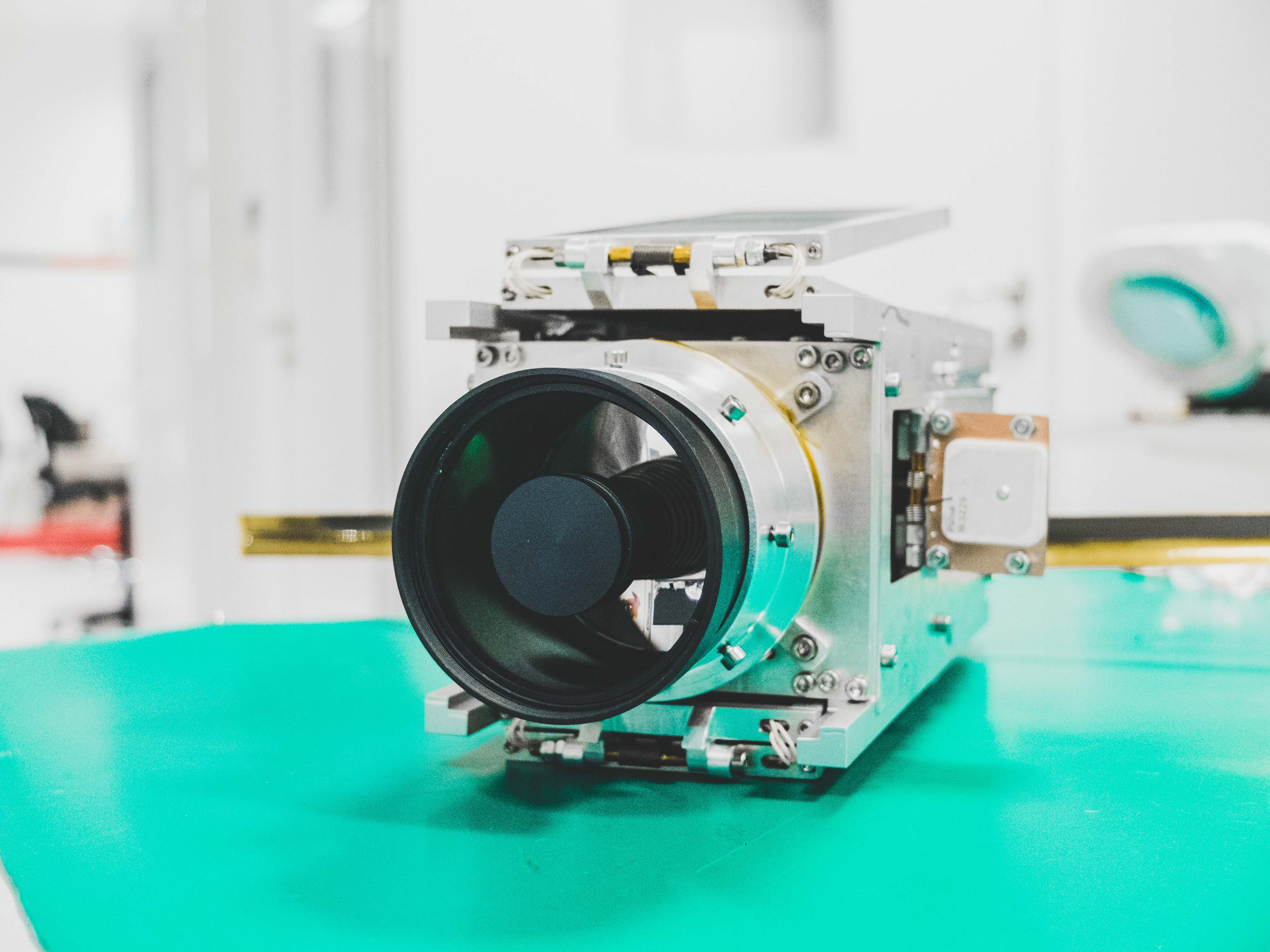
- Światowid prior to launch
- Mission type: Earth observation
- Operator: SatRevolution
- COSPAR ID: 1998-067QL
- SATCAT no.: 44426
- Mission duration: 20 months 11 days

Spacecraft properties
- Spacecraft type: Satellite
- Manufacturer: SatRevolution
- Launch mass: 2kg

Start of mission
- Launch date: 17 April 2019, 20:46:07 UTC
- Rocket: Antares Cygnus NG-11
- Launch site: Mid-Atlantic Regional Spaceport P0A
- Contractor: Northrop Grumman

End of mission
- Last contact: 14 March 2021

Orbital parameters
- Perigee altitude: 417 km
- Apogee altitude: 420 km
- Inclination: 51.6395°
- Period: 93 minutes

Światowid was a 2U Polish cubesat developed by the firm SatRevolution that was Poland's first fully commercial satellite.

== Development ==
Światowid's primary payload was an experimental earth observation system designed to monitor water quality, smog and forest fires. Światowid would be entirely constructed in Wrocław with its chassis 3d printed out of an aluminium alloy.

One of the developers, Grzegorz Zwoliński, said that the name of the satellite was inspired by writings of Andrzej Sapkowski based on Central European mythology, and the name "Światowid" (świat ('world') + widzieć ('see')) fits the purpose of the satellite: to watch.

The satellite was announced on September 15, 2016, while SatRevolution itself was founded on 27 June 2016. In their announcement SatRevolution stated that its development was designed to draw attention to Poland's growing satellite manufacturing sector.

Światowid initially sought to launch on a Falcon 9 rideshare mission in 2017 before pursuing a launch by a Neptune N3 fitted with a Poly Picosatellite Orbital Deployer in 2018. By October 2018 its launch ultimately shifted to a Cygnus with deployment from the International Space Station.

== Launch ==
Światowid would be launched on the Cygnus NG-11 on 17 April 2019, 20:46:07 UTC alongside another Polish cubesat, KRAKSAT, from Jagiellonian University. The Satellite had an expected mission life of 12 to 15 months.

Światowid would be deployed from the ISS from the NanoRacks dispenser mounted on the Kibō module on July 3 at approximately 11:50–11:55 UTC. Światowid would burn up in earth's atmosphere on approximately March 14, 2021 after spending 20 months and 11 days in space.

== See also ==
- List of Polish satellites
- KRAKSAT
