= Napa-1 =

Thai satellite

- COSPAR ID: 2020-061BA
- SATCAT no.: 46320

Napa-1 (Thai: นภา-1), also known as RTAF-SAT-1, is a Thai Earth observation satellite. It is the first satellite of the Royal Thai Air Force.

== Development and mission ==
Napa-1 was built by Dutch firm Innovative Solutions In Space (ISISPACE). According to the Bangkok Post, the satellite cost less than 100 million baht.

The launch of Napa-1 was originally scheduled for September 2019, but was delayed twice due to technical issues, and then again in March 2020 due to the COVID-19 pandemic. Ultimately, the satellite was launched on 3 September 2020 from Guiana Space Centre in French Guiana on Arianespace Vega rocket's flight VV16.

The satellite orbits the Earth in a sun-synchronous orbit at an altitude of 500 kilometres (310 mi) and a speed of 7.61 kilometres (4.73 mi) per second, passing over Thailand 4 times per day.

== Payload ==
The nano satellite is based on Innovative Solutions In Space's ISISPACE 6U CubeSat and is designed to function for three years.

It carries a Gecko Imager manufactured by South African firm SCS Space as its primary payload, as well as a technology demonstration TriScape100 Imager from Simera Sense. The Gecko Imager is a color imager with a ground sample distance of 39 metres (128 ft), and the TriScape100 imager is another color imager with a ground sample distance of 5 metres (16 ft).

Napa-1 uses the two instruments for remote sensing, including disaster relief such as combating floods and wildfire detection, as well as for space situational awareness, detecting potential satellite espionage or space objects at risk of falling onto Thai territory.
