= KRAKSAT =

Earth observation satellite

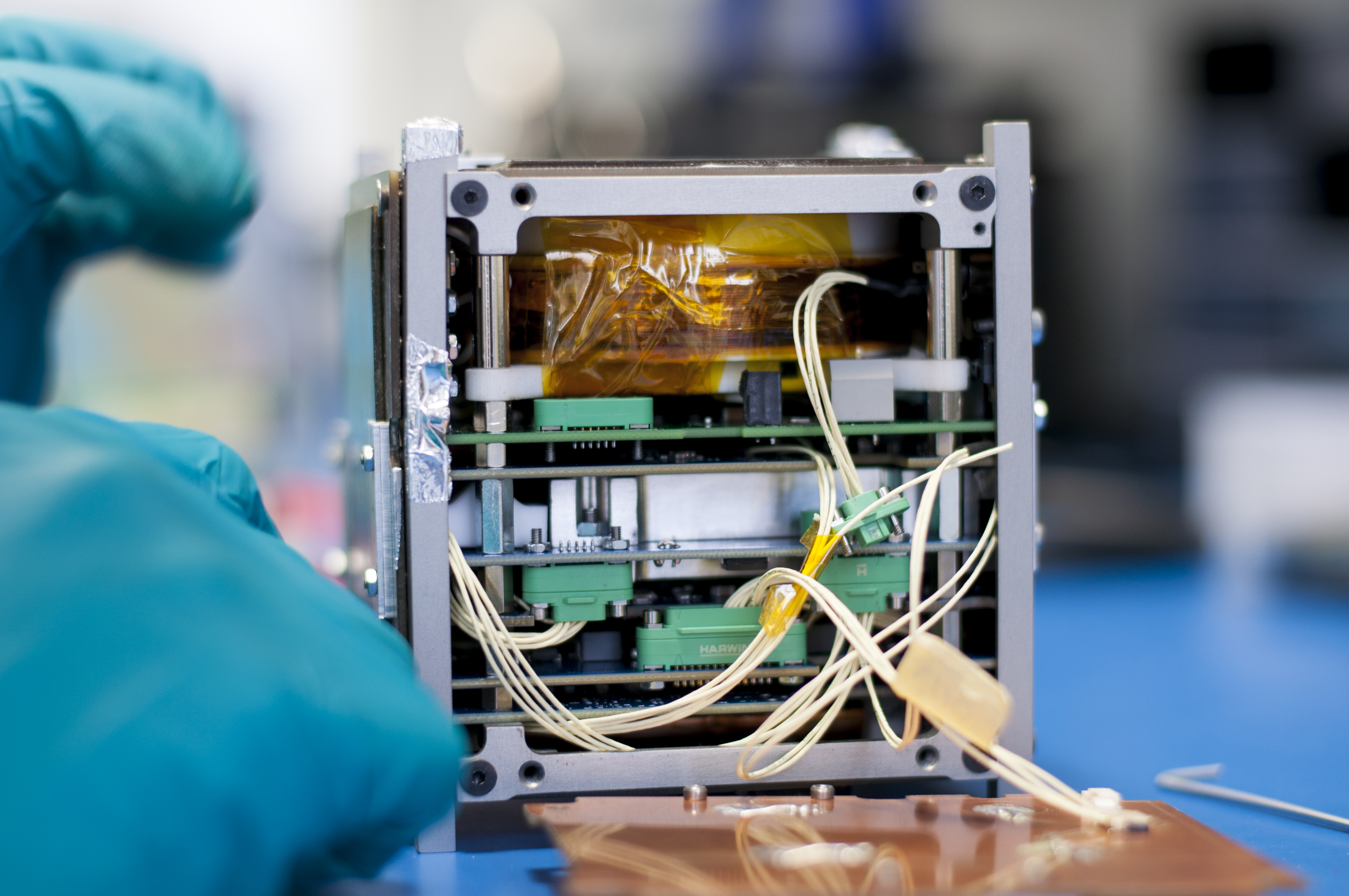
- KRAKSAT during assembly
- Mission type: Academic
- Operator: Jagiellonian University
- COSPAR ID: 1998-067QM
- SATCAT no.: 44427
- Website: kraksat.pl

Spacecraft properties
- Spacecraft type: Satellite
- Manufacturer: SatRevolution
- Launch mass: 1kg

Start of mission
- Launch date: 17 April 2019, 20:46:07 UTC
- Rocket: Antares Cygnus NG-11
- Launch site: Mid-Atlantic Regional Spaceport P0A
- Contractor: Northrop Grumman

Orbital parameters
- Perigee altitude: 417 km
- Apogee altitude: 420 km
- Inclination: 51.6395°
- Period: 93 minutes
- KRAKSAT's logo

KRAKSAT was a Polish 1U CubeSat developed and operated by students at Jagiellonian University and manufactured by SatRevolution. KRAKSAT would be launched to the ISS on Cygnus NG-11, and deployed on July 3, 2019.

== Development ==
KRAKSAT was developed by students at Krakow's Jagiellonian University and was manufactured by the Wrocław based company SatRevolution. The satellite's primary payload was to investigate how ferrofluid behaves in space, and to explore its use as a flywheel. The secondary payload was a microSD card carrying over 1.2 thousand messages from Polish internet users.

== Launch ==
KRAKSAT would be launched on the Cygnus NG-11 on 17 April 2019, 20:46:07 UTC alongside another Polish cubesat, Światowid. KRAKSAT was released from the ISS on June 3, 2019, however, suffered from a steadily decreasing battery voltage resulting in multiple re-boots per orbit, and a software issue that prevented use of its secondary radio link. Regardless KRAKSAT would deorbit on 17 January 2022.

== See also ==
- List of Polish satellites
- Światowid (satellite)
