= Nemo HD =

Slovenian Earth observation satellite

- Operator: (Slovenia) Space-SI
- COSPAR ID: 2020-061F
- Website: www.space.si/en/microsatellite

Spacecraft properties
- Bus: NEMO
- Manufacturer: (Canada) Space Flight Laboratory

Start of mission
- Launch date: 3 September 2020
- Rocket: Vega

Nemo HD (Nanosatellite for Earth Monitoring and Observation – High Definition) is an Earth observation satellite development by the University of Toronto's Space Flight Laboratory for the Slovenian Centre of Excellence for Space Sciences and Technologies (Space-SI). It was launched to low Earth orbit in September 2020 Vega flight VV16 together with another Slovenian satellite named TriSat, as the first two space missions of Slovenia. The spacecraft's primary instrument is a multispectral imager working in four spectral bands ground sample distance of 2.8 m on a swath of 10 km. The secondary imager works at a ground sample distance of 40 m with a wider field of view. Both instruments can also capture real-time video at 25 frames per second The satellite's data are used in monitoring agriculture, forestry, urban development, and marine transport.

== See also ==
- List of Slovenian satellites
