= Eycore =

Polish space company

- Company type: Private (sp. z o.o.)
- Industry: Space industry
- Founded: 2021
- Headquarters: Warsaw, Poland
- Key people: Maciej Klemm (CEO); Tomasz Kusowski (vice-president)
- Products: Synthetic-aperture radar, Earth observation satellites
- Parent: Advanced Protection Systems
- Website: www.eycore.com

Eycore is a Polish new space company that designs synthetic-aperture radar (SAR) payloads and Earth observation satellites equipped with the technology. Headquartered in Warsaw and registered in 2021, it was established on the basis of the Polish radar manufacturer Advanced Protection Systems (APS), a producer of counter-drone systems. In May 2026 it placed its first satellite, Eycore-1, in orbit, becoming the second privately owned company in Europe to own a SAR satellite.

== History ==
Eycore was registered in 2021 and grew out of Advanced Protection Systems, a Polish manufacturer of counter-drone and ground-based radar systems co-founded by Maciej Klemm. Klemm serves as the company's chief executive officer, while Tomasz Kusowski is a co-founder and vice-president of its management board. In addition to its headquarters in Warsaw, the company maintains an office in Bristol, United Kingdom.

== Operations ==
Eycore designs radar payloads and satellites carrying synthetic-aperture radar, which allows imaging of the Earth's surface regardless of cloud cover or time of day. The company aims to build a sovereign Polish and European, military-grade radar imaging capability that is resistant to jamming, and to "democratize" access to SAR technology; its first systems operate in the X band. The technology has both civilian and military applications, including monitoring troop movements, protecting critical infrastructure and assessing damage after natural disasters.

== Eycore-1 ==
Eycore-1 is the first Polish satellite to use a synthetic-aperture radar developed and built in Poland, operating in the X band. It is based on the MP42 microsatellite bus made by the Lithuanian manufacturer Kongsberg NanoAvionics and carries a deployable active phased-array antenna of five panels. The satellite operates in a Sun-synchronous orbit at an altitude of about 510 km and supports Stripmap, Spotlight and ScanSAR imaging modes. It was launched on 3 May 2026 on a SpaceX Falcon 9 rocket from Vandenberg Space Force Base in California, as part of the CAS500-2 rideshare mission.

== Partnerships and projects ==
In April 2025 Eycore joined a consortium that secured a European Space Agency contract to develop Poland's CAMILA Earth observation satellite constellation, the first three satellites of which are expected to launch in late 2027. In July 2025 the company signed an agreement with Kongsberg NanoAvionics to collaborate on a next generation of SAR satellites for NATO and allied defence applications.
