= DIDO-2 =

DIDO-2 (COSPAR 2017-008BE) is a nano-satellite of the Israeli / Swiss company SpacePharma. The nano-satellite is part of a research project whose goal is to test a miniaturized end-to-end pharmaceutical laboratory (called mGnify lab) in space under microgravity conditions. The project includes two satellites called DIDO-1 and DIDO-2. The platforms of the 3U CubeSats are developed and built by the Dutch company ISIS.

The first satellite DIDO-1 was originally to fly on a Falcon 9 in 2016. The current (as of 2019) status and plans for this satellite are unknown.

DIDO-2 was successfully launched on February 15, 2017, at 3:58 UTC from Satish Dhawan Space Centre on a PSLV-XL rocket (mission PSLV-C37) that released 104 satellites. The satellite reentered the atmosphere on 12 July 2024.

In 2018, a third mission, DIDO-3 was being planned.

== Specifications ==
DIDO-2 is a 3U CubeSat, weighing 4.2 kg.
