= AMICal Sat =

French-Russian-Polish observation satellite

- Mission type: Atmospheric science
- Operator: Grenoble Alpes University

Spacecraft properties
- Spacecraft type: Satellite
- Manufacturer: SatRevolution
- Launch mass: 2 kg

Start of mission
- Launch date: 3 September 2020, 01:51:10 UTC
- Rocket: Vega
- Launch site: Guiana Space Centre
- Contractor: European Space Agency

End of mission
- Last contact: 10 January 2025, 9:25 UTC
- Decay date: 11 January 2025

Orbital parameters
- Reference system: Geocentric
- Regime: Sun-synchronous
- Altitude: 515 km

AMICal Sat was a 2U Cubesat developed by Grenoble Alpes University in partnership with Moscow State University and built by the Polish firm SatRev. AMICal Sat was designed to measure particle flux at the top of the Earth's atmosphere using an optical imager. As such its primary payload was an in-house RGB detector with a pixel size of 10 μms to detect small particles.

== Background ==
AMICal Sat was designed and operated by the Grenoble University Space Centre (CSUG) in partnership with Institute of Planetology and Astrophysics of Grenoble (IPAG) both run by Grenoble Alpes University.

== Launch ==
AMICal Sat launched on Vega flight VV16 on 3 September 2020 from the Guiana Space Centre. 10 days into AMICal Sat's mission its ADCS would fail, preventing the imager from properly orientating itself. Despite this AMICal Sat was still able to collect data that allowed researchers to reconstruct the particle fluxes that create the polar auroras and study the interaction of solar wind with the atmosphere. AMICal Sat would burn up in the Earth's atmosphere with its final telemetry report coming at 9:25am (UT) on 10 January 2025.

== Legacy ==
A followup mission ATISE consisting of a 12U CubeSat was designed to use a spectrometer and particle detector to continue AMICal Sat's original mission.
