= SatRevolution =

Polish space company

SatRev SA
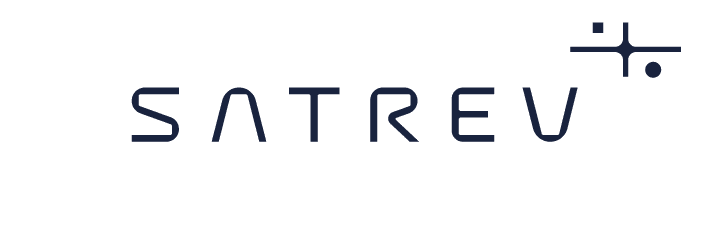
- Type: Private Space
- Industry: Aerospace
- Founded: 2016; 10 years ago
- Founders: Grzegorz Zwoliński
- Headquarters: Wrocław, Poland
- Key people: Grzegorz Zwoliński (CEO)
- Website: satrev.space

SatRev S.A. is a Polish aerospace company established in 2016, that specializes in building small, lightweight, nanosatellites. The company has been listed in the NASA's "State of the Art Small Spacecraft Technology" report as one of the leading nanosatellite part producers in the world.

== Satellites ==
=== Academic Cubesats ===
==== KRAKSAT (2019) ====
KRAKSAT was a 1U Cubesat designed by students at Krakow's Jagiellonian University to test the feasibility of using a ferrofluid as reaction wheels. KRAKSAT would be launched alongside Światowid on 17 April 2019 at 20:46 UTC on board Cygnus NG-11 to the International Space Station where it was deployed from the Japanese module of the International Space Station, Kibō, on 3 July 2019, at 11:50 UTC. KRAKSAT suffered from a steadily decreasing battery voltage resulting in multiple re-boots per orbit, and a software issue that prevented use of its secondary radio link. Światowid decayed from orbit on 14 March 2021. KRAKSAT decayed on 17 January 2022.

==== AMICal Sat (2020) ====
AMICal Sat was a 2U Cubesat built by SatRev for France's Grenoble Alpes University in partnership with the State University of Moscow. AMICal Sat's primary payload was an RGB detector with a pixel size of 10 μms to detect small particles in order to study the interaction between solar wind and other particles and the atmosphere. It would launch on on Vega flight VV16 on 3 September 2020 from the Guiana Space Centre. After 10 days AMICal Sat's ADCS would fail, preventing the imager from properly orientating itself, although it was still able to record data. AMICal Sat would burn up in the Earth's atmosphere with its final telemetry report coming at 9:25am (UT) on 10 January 2025.

==== LabSat (2022) ====
LabSat was a 3U cubesat that served as a scientific platform for in-orbit experiments developed by Polish academic institutions, including the Wrocław University of Science and Technology. It too was launched on 13 January 2022 as part of the Transporter-3 mission on a Falcon 9 Block 5 rocket. The satellite re-entered the atmosphere on 10 September 2024.

=== Światowid ===
Światowid was a demonstration earth observation satellite that SatRevolution intended to offer as a standardized product that was launched alongside KRAKSAT on 17 April 2019 at 20:46 UTC on Cygnus NG-11 before being deployed from Kibō on 3 July. After its release, Światowid began transmitting signals, which were received by amateur radio ground stations on the same day. Since the beginning of the mission, the satellite captured and transmitted images of the Earth's surface. One of the first objects photographed by Światowid was the Greater Gabbard wind farm off the coast of Great Britain, photographed on 6 August 2019.

=== STORK ===
STORK was a 3U cubesat constellation that was planned to consist of 14 earth observation satellites equipped with SatRev's Vision-300 imager, capable of a ground resolution of up to 5 m. In June 2021 SatRev placed the first two satellites, STORK-4 and STORK-5 Marta, on the Low Earth Orbit using Virgin Orbit LauncherOne rocket. Two more satellites, STORK-1 and STORK-2, have been launched on 13 January 2022 with a SpaceX Falcon 9 Block 5 rocket as part of the Transporter-3 mission while another one, STORK-3, has been launched on the same day by Virgin Orbit using a LauncherOne rocket. STORK-6 launched on 9 January 2023 with the LauncherOne rocket of Virgin Orbit. The launch was a failure and STORK-6 did not achieve orbit. As of August 2024, only 5 STORK satellites (STORK-1 through STORK-5) have been launched into orbit (STORK-6 did not reach orbit) and they have all decayed from orbit; the last to decay was STORK-2 on 4 May 2024. Despite the announcements made by SatRev, none of the satellites in the STORK series has transmitted any Earth imagery that has been publicly disclosed as of February 2024.

=== SW1FT ===
SW1FT was a 3U cubesat for Earth imaging purposes that was launched on 13 January 2022 together with STORK-1 and STORK-2 on a Falcon 9 Block 5 rocket. It decayed from orbit on 2 May 2024.

=== AMAN-1 ===
In February 2022 the Sultanate of Oman, SatRev, Virgin Orbit and Tuatara together signed a Memorandum of Understanding for collaboration on Oman’s first mission to deep space. SatRevolution planned to put the first Omani nanosatellite into orbit by the end of 2022. The satellite was expected to be launched from Spaceport Cornwall in the United Kingdom aboard the Virgin Orbit LauncherOne rocket. The satellite, named AMAN-1, was launched on 9 January 2023 from Spaceport Cornwall by Virgin Orbit with their LauncherOne rocket; the launch was a failure and the satellite did not achieve orbit.

Following the failure of the first AMAN-1 mission, SatRev prepared another mission named STORK-7/AMAN-1. This satellite was launched on November 11, 2023, aboard a Falcon-9 rocket as part of the Transporter-9 mission. The satellite was integrated by Momentus. However, on December 5, 2023, Momentus announced that the separation of the STORK-7/AMAN-1 satellite failed, and the satellite was irretrievably lost.

In light of the loss of the STORK-7/AMAN-1 satellite, announced by Momentus, there is debate surrounding the announcement made by the ETCO SPACE following Omani news agency Oman Daily Observer on 21 January 2024 regarding the acquisition of high-quality imagery from the AMAN-1 satellite. Shortly after the announcement, comments surfaced indicating that one of the images purportedly taken by the STORK-7/AMAN-1 satellite bears a striking resemblance to an image available on the website of the Planet Labs. The similarity extends to dynamic details such as the position of a vessel at sea, its track, wake, and the varying color of the waters near the coast. This situation implies that the image must have been captured simultaneously and from the same perspective as a satellite from the Planet Labs constellation. Moreover, the resolution and angle of both images are remarkably similar.

== See also ==
- List of spaceflight launches in July–December 2021
- List of spaceflight launches in January–June 2022
- List of proposed Solar System spacecraft
- List of missions to Mars
- List of Polish satellites
