= ExactEarth =

exactEarth Ltd
- Company type: Subsidiary
- Founded: June 2009
- Headquarters: Cambridge, Canada
- Key people: Peter Mabson, CEO
- Products: Satellite AIS Data Services and Solutions
- Parent: Spire Global
- Website: https://www.exactEarth.com

exactEarth Ltd is a Canadian company that specializes in data services that deliver real-time global location-based maritime vessel tracking information utilizing patented satellite AIS detection technology.

exactEarth provides satellite AIS data services to commercial markets as well as government customers in India, Canada, United States, Australia and across Europe.

Founded in 2009, exactEarth is based in Cambridge, Ontario, Canada. The company was publicly traded until 2021 when Spire Global acquired the company.

== History ==
In 2005, COM DEV International first recognized that the AIS messages being transmitted by major ships could potentially be received from space. COM DEV validated its AIS detection capability through aircraft trials in 2007 and launched a nanosatellite (EV0) in April 2008.

exactEarth commenced commercial operations in June 2009. In September 2010, Hisdesat acquired a 27% equity interest for CA$15 million in cash, with COM DEV retaining 73%.

On 23 June 2015, exactEarth filed a Preliminary Prospectus with Canadian Securities Administrators, announcing their intentions to launch an Initial public offering (IPO). However, on 5 November 2015, exactEarth's largest shareholder, COM DEV, announced plans for an acquisition by Honeywell with exactEarth spinning out into its own publicly traded company. exactEarth's prospectus was abandoned. COM DEV shareholders approved the acquisition on 21 January 2016, with each COM DEV shareholder receiving 0.1977 exactEarth stock for every COM DEV stock held. Final court approval of the acquisition came on 25 January 2016.

On 9 February 2016, exactEarth became a publicly traded company, trading on the Toronto Stock Exchange with the ticker symbol of XCT. For a while, HISDESAT Servicios Estratégicos S.A. was the largest stakeholder. However, in December 2021, the company was acquired by Spire Global and its stock were de-listed from the TSX.

== Satellites ==
On 8 June 2015, exactEarth announced a partnership with Harris Corporation to build 58 AIS detecting payloads to be launched on board the Iridium NEXT satellite constellation. It is expected that this constellation will provide global average revisit times and customer data latency of less than one minute.

As of October 2015, exactEarth operates a satellite constellation consisting of 9 satellites.

Name	Satellite Catalog Number	Launch date	Launch vehicle	Constructor	Notes
CANX 6 (EV0)	32784	28 April 2008	Polar Satellite Launch Vehicle		Retired, used for R&D
ExactView-1 (EV1)	38709	22 July 2012	Soyuz-FG	Surrey Satellite Technology Limited	
Resourcesat-2 (EV2)	37387	20 April 2011	Polar Satellite Launch Vehicle-G		
AprizeSat-6 (EV6)	37793	17 August 2011	Dnepr		
AprizeSat-7 (EV5R)	39416	21 November 2013	Dnepr		
AprizeSat-8 (EV12)	39425	21 November 2013	Dnepr		
AprizeSat-9 (EV11)	40018	19 June 2014	Dnepr		
AprizeSat-10 (EV13)	40019	19 June 2014	Dnepr		
ExactView-9 (EV9)	40936	28 September 2015	Polar Satellite Launch Vehicle-XL		
M3MSat (EV7)	41605	22 June 2016	Polar Satellite Launch Vehicle-XL		
PAZ (EV10)	43215	22 February 2018	Falcon 9 Full Thrust		

== Projects ==
exactEarth satellite AIS data was used in

- security efforts at the 2010 Olympics and Paralympics.
- the ship emission modelling project of the Finnish Meteorological Institute.
- ScanEx RDC effort in identifying illegal shipping within marine protected natural areas.

== Awards ==
In 2009, exactEarth technology was recognized at the Ontario Premier's Innovation Awards for developing a satellite system for their work on satellite AIS.
