= SpacePharma =

Microgravity research and manufacturing company

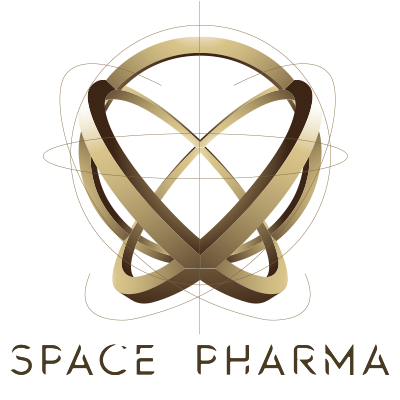
- Type: Privately held company
- Industry: Space industry, biotechnology
- Founded: 2012
- Founder: Yossi Yamin, Martin Aebi (Ido Priel left his active position)
- Headquarters: Courgenay, Switzerland
- Products: SPMG, NEXUS, DIDO, SPAd, SPID, MOTI
- Services: Microgravity research, and mass production of monoclonal antibodies, small molecules and 3D Bioprinting
- Number of employees: apx 20
- Website: spacepharma.health

SpacePharma is a Swiss–Israeli biotechnology company with a primary focus on conducting scientific experiments in microgravity conditions. The company was the first fully private, commercially oriented company established with the specific intention to conduct pharmaceutical research and development (R&D) and manufacturing in space.

The company was founded by Yossi Yamin, a former Commander of an Israeli Satellite Unit in the Israeli Defense Forces (IDF). As of the mid-2020s, SpacePharma has offices in Herzliya, Israel; Courgenay, Switzerland; and Palo Alto, California, with a Space Life Sciences Lab in Exploration Park, Florida, US.

== Overview ==
The company operates miniaturized, unmanned, remotely controlled, and fully automated labs based on lab-on-a-chip (LOC) technology, which are suitable for a wide variety of life science and chemistry experiments. These labs are designed to conduct research in space and to leverage the microgravity conditions that can't be replicated in terrestrial settings.

== Operations ==
SpacePharma's operations include the launch and operation of free-orbit satellites and labs onboard the International Space Station (ISS).

The company's DIDO-2 and DIDO-3 satellites were launched in 2017 and 2020 respectively, carrying experiments to study crystallization, emulsion, enzyme activity and antimicrobial resistance in microgravity.

Additionally, SpacePharma has launched at least 7 autonomous labs to the ISS since 2017, starting with the NEXUS-1 and NEXUS-2 labs, followed by the SPAd and SPAd-2 labs. In April 2022 a SPAd-2 lab was delivered to the ISS on the Axiom-1 mission, where it performed a series of experiments studying bone loss, DNA damage repair, and the cultivation of cultured meat in space.

SpacePharma has announced it is working on a large scale pharmaceutical manufacturing facility in orbit named MoTi.
