= List of spaceflight launches in April–June 2026 =

This article lists orbital and suborbital launches during the first quarter of the year 2026.

For all other spaceflight activities, see 2026 in spaceflight. For launches during the rest of 2026, see List of spaceflight launches in January–March 2026, List of spaceflight launches in July–September 2026, and List of spaceflight launches in October–December 2026.

== Orbital launches ==
- ← Jan
- Feb
- Mar
- Apr
- May
- Jun
- Jul
- Aug
- Sep
- Oct
- Nov
- Dec →

=== April ===
Date and time (UTC)	Rocket	Flight number	Launch site		LSP	
Date and time (UTC)	Payload (⚀ = CubeSat)	Operator	Orbit	Function	Decay (UTC)	Outcome
Date and time (UTC)	Remarks					
1 April; 22:35:12	(United States) SLS Block 1		(United States) Kennedy LC-39B		(United States) NASA	
1 April; 22:35:12	(United States) Artemis II (Integrity)	NASA	Lunar free-return	Crewed lunar flyby	11 April; 00:07:27	Successful
1 April; 22:35:12	⚀ (Argentina) ATENEA	CONAE	Highly elliptical	Technology demonstration	5 April	Successful
1 April; 22:35:12	⚀ (South Korea) K-Rad Cube	KARI	Highly elliptical	Technology demonstration	5 April	Spacecraft failure
1 April; 22:35:12	⚀ (Saudi Arabia) SWC-1	SSA	Highly elliptical	Space Weather	In orbit	Operational
1 April; 22:35:12	⚀ (Germany) TACHELES	DLR	Highly elliptical	Technology demonstration	5 April	Spacecraft failure
1 April; 22:35:12	First crewed test flight of SLS and Orion. First crewed mission beyond low Earth orbit since Apollo 17 in 1972. First woman, person of color, and person not from the United States to fly beyond low Earth orbit and to the Moon's vicinity. Became farthest crewed spaceflight from Earth, at a maximum distance of 252,756 miles (406,771 km).					
2 April; 11:55:10	(United States) Falcon 9 Block 5	Starlink Group 10-58	(United States) Cape Canaveral SLC-40		(United States) SpaceX	
2 April; 11:55:10	(United States) Starlink × 29	SpaceX	Low Earth	Communications	In orbit	Operational
3 April; 04:17:00	(China) Tianlong-3	Y1	(China) Jiuquan		(China) Space Pioneer	
3 April; 04:17:00	(China) TBA	TBA	Low Earth (Polar)	TBA	3 April	Launch failure
3 April; 04:17:00	Maiden flight of the Tianlong-3 launch vehicle.					
3 April; 06:28:00	(Russia) Soyuz-2.1a / Fregat-M		(Russia) Plesetsk Site 43/3		(Russia) RVSN RF	
3 April; 06:28:00	(Russia) Meridian-M №11	VKS	Molniya	Communications	In orbit	Operational
4 April; 05:45:00	(United States) Atlas V 551	LA-05/Leo-5	(United States) Cape Canaveral SLC-41		(United States) ULA	
4 April; 05:45:00	(United States) LeoSat × 29	Amazon Leo	Low Earth	Communications	In orbit	Operational
4 April; 05:45:00	With a mass of around 16.5 tonnes, LA-05 is the heaviest payload to be launched by an Atlas V. Sixth of nine Amazon Leo launches on Atlas V.					
7 April; 02:50:39	(United States) Falcon 9 Block 5	Starlink Group 17-35	(United States) Vandenberg SLC-4E		(United States) SpaceX	
7 April; 02:50:39	(United States) Starlink × 25	SpaceX	Low Earth	Communications	In orbit	Operational
7 April; 11:33:00	(United States) Minotaur IV		(United States) Vandenberg SLC-8		(United States) Northrop Grumman	
7 April; 11:33:00	(United States) STPSat-7	United States Space Force	Low Earth	Technology demonstration	In orbit	Operational
7 April; 11:33:00	⚀ (United States) Rawhide x 2	US Army SMDC	Low Earth	Technology demonstration	In orbit	Operational
7 April; 11:33:00	⚀ (United States) CANVAS	University of Colorado Boulder	Low Earth	Magnetosphereic research	In orbit	Operational
7 April; 11:33:00	⚀ (United States) AggieSat-6	Texas A&M University	Low Earth	Technology demonstration	In orbit	Operational
7 April; 11:33:00	⚀ (United States) ASTRA-HyRAX	Auburn University	Low Earth	Technology demonstration	In orbit	Operational
7 April; 11:33:00	⚀ (United States) MISR-C1	SOCOM	Low Earth	Technology demonstration	In orbit	Operational
7 April; 11:33:00	⚀ (United States) MISR-C2	SOCOM	Low Earth	Technology demonstration	In orbit	Operational
7 April; 11:33:00	STP-S29A mission					
7 April; 13:32:00	(China) Long March 8	Y7 / Spacesail Polar Group 07	(China) Wenchang Commercial LC-1		(China) CASC	
7 April; 13:32:00	(China) Qianfan × 18	SSST	Low Earth (Polar)	Communications	In orbit	Operational
8 April; 19:39:08	(China) Long March 6A	6A-Y17 / SatNet LEO Group 21	(China) Taiyuan LA-9A		(China) CASC	
8 April; 19:39:08	(China) Guowang × 5	CAST	Low Earth	Communications	In orbit	Operational
11 April; 05:04:19	(United States) Falcon 9 Block 5	Starlink Group 17-21	(United States) Vandenberg SLC-4E		(United States) SpaceX	
11 April; 05:04:19	(United States) Starlink × 25	SpaceX	Low Earth	Communications	In orbit	Operational
11 April; 11:32:00	(China) Jielong 3	Y11	Dong Fang Hang Tian Gang platform, South China Sea		China Rocket	
11 April; 11:32:00	(China) Hulianwang Jishu Shiyan 8A	CAST	Low Earth (Polar)	TBA	In orbit	Operational
11 April; 11:41:21	(United States) Falcon 9 Block 5	F9-626	(United States) Cape Canaveral SLC-40		(United States) SpaceX	
11 April; 11:41:21	(United States) Cygnus NG-24	NASA	Low Earth (ISS)	ISS logistics	12 October	Successful
11 April; 11:41:21	⚀ (United States) Coconut	Arizona State University	Low Earth	Amateur radio	In orbit	Operational
11 April; 11:41:21	⚀ (Japan) HOKUSHIN-1	Tohoku University / Hokkaido University / Muroran Institute of Technology	Low Earth	Technology demonstration	In orbit	Operational
11 April; 11:41:21	⚀ (United States) HUCSat	Harvard College	Low Earth	Technology demonstration	In orbit	Operational
11 April; 11:41:21	⚀ (United States) LEOPARDSat-1	University of Cincinnati	Low Earth	Educational / Technology demonstration	In orbit	Operational
11 April; 11:41:21	⚀ (United States) PROVES-Alcyone	Columbia University	Low Earth	Amateur radio	In orbit	Operational
11 April; 11:41:21	⚀ (United States) PROVES-Atlas	Northeastern University	Low Earth	Amateur radio	In orbit	Operational
11 April; 11:41:21	⚀ (United States) PROVES-Electra	University of California, Santa Cruz	Low Earth	Amateur radio	In orbit	Operational
11 April; 11:41:21	Last of four Cygnus spacecraft launched on Falcon 9. HOKUSHIN-1 was deployed into orbit from ISS on 19 June 2026. Coconut, HUCSat, LEOPARDSat-1, PROVES-Alcyone, PROVES-Atlas, and PROVES-Electra are presumed to have been deployed into orbit from ISS as NRCSD#30 on 2 July 2026.					
14 April; 04:03:00	(China) Kinetica 1	Y12	(China) Jiuquan LS-130		(China) CAS Space	
14 April; 04:03:00	(China) Jilin-1 Gaofen-07A 02-04	CGSTL	Low Earth (SSO)	Earth observation	In orbit	Operational
14 April; 04:03:00	(China) Jilin-1 Gaofen-07B 02-04	CAS	Low Earth (SSO)	Earth observation	In orbit	Operational
14 April; 04:03:00	(China) Jilin-1 Gaofen-07C 02-03	CGSTL	Low Earth (SSO)	Earth observation	In orbit	Operational
14 April; 09:33:10	(United States) Falcon 9 Block 5	Starlink Group 10-24	(United States) Cape Canaveral SLC-40		(United States) SpaceX	
14 April; 09:33:10	(United States) Starlink × 29	SpaceX	Low Earth	Communications	In orbit	Operational
15 April; 04:29:40	(United States) Falcon 9 Block 5	Starlink Group 17-27	(United States) Vandenberg SLC-4E		(United States) SpaceX	
15 April; 04:29:40	(United States) Starlink × 25	SpaceX	Low Earth	Communications	In orbit	Operational
16 April; 23:18:00	(Russia) Soyuz-2.1b / Volga		(Russia) Plesetsk Site 43		(Russia) RVSN RF	
16 April; 23:18:00	(Russia) Kosmos 2609	VKS	Low Earth (SSO)	TBA	In orbit	Operational
16 April; 23:18:00	(Russia) Kosmos 2610	VKS	Low Earth (SSO)	TBA	In orbit	Operational
16 April; 23:18:00	(Russia) Kosmos 2611	VKS	Low Earth (SSO)	TBA	In orbit	Operational
16 April; 23:18:00	(Russia) Kosmos 2612	VKS	Low Earth (SSO)	TBA	In orbit	Operational
16 April; 23:18:00	(Russia) Kosmos 2613	VKS	Low Earth (SSO)	TBA	In orbit	Operational
16 April; 23:18:00	(Russia) Kosmos 2614	VKS	Low Earth (SSO)	TBA	In orbit	Operational
16 April; 23:18:00	(Russia) Kosmos 2615	VKS	Low Earth (SSO)	TBA	In orbit	Operational
16 April; 23:18:00	(Russia) Kosmos 2616	VKS	Low Earth (SSO)	TBA	In orbit	Operational
16 April; 23:18:00	Maiden flight of Soyuz-2.1b / Volga Configuration.					
17 April; 04:10:00	(China) Long March 4C	4C-Y41	(China) Jiuquan SLS-2		(China) CASC	
17 April; 04:10:00	(China) Daqi-2 (AEMS-2)	Ministry of Ecology and Environment	Low Earth (SSO)	Earth observation	In orbit	Operational
19 April; 11:25:00	(United States) New Glenn	NG-3	(United States) Cape Canaveral LC-36		(United States) Blue Origin	
19 April; 11:25:00	(United States) BlueBird 7	AST SpaceMobile	Low Earth	Communications	19 April	Launch failure
19 April; 11:25:00	BlueBird Block 2 Flight Mission 2. Third National Security Space Launch demonstration flight for New Glenn. First New Glenn launch with a reused booster. BlueBird 7 was placed into a lower than planned orbit by the upper stage. While the satellite separated from the launch vehicle and powered on, the altitude was too low to sustain operations with its on-board thruster technology and had been de-orbited.					
19 April; 14:35:00	(United States) Falcon 9 Block 5	Starlink Group 17-22	(United States) Vandenberg SLC-4E		(United States) SpaceX	
19 April; 14:35:00	(United States) Starlink × 25	SpaceX	Low Earth	Communications	In orbit	Operational
21 April; 06:53:00	(United States) Falcon 9 Block 5	F9-630	(United States) Cape Canaveral SLC-40		(United States) SpaceX	
21 April; 06:53:00	(United States) GPS III-10 Hedy Lamarr	U.S. Space Force	Medium Earth	Navigation	In orbit	Operational
21 April; 06:53:00	Named after American actress and inventor Hedy Lamarr. Reassigned from Falcon 9 to Vulcan when GPS III-07, intended to launch on Vulcan, was moved to Falcon 9 in mid-2024 following Vulcan readiness concerns, and moved back to Falcon 9 following the USSF-87 launch anomaly in February 2026. The upper stage carried "Freedom 250" flag.					
23 April; 03:09:00	(United States) Electron	"Kakushin Rising"	(New Zealand) Mahia LC-1		(United States) Rocket Lab	
23 April; 03:09:00	⚀ (Japan) ARICA-2	Aoyama Gakuin University	Low Earth (SSO)	TBA	In orbit	Operational
23 April; 03:09:00	⚀ (Japan) FSI-SAT	Future Science Institute	Low Earth (SSO)	TBA	In orbit	Operational
23 April; 03:09:00	⚀ (Japan) KOSEN-2R	National Institute of Technology, Yonago College	Low Earth (SSO)	TBA	In orbit	Operational
23 April; 03:09:00	⚀ (Japan) MAGNARO-II	Nagoya University	Low Earth (SSO)	TBA	In orbit	Operational
23 April; 03:09:00	⚀ (Japan) Mono-Nikko	Di-Nikko Engineering Co., Ltd.	Low Earth (SSO)	TBA	In orbit	Operational
23 April; 03:09:00	⚀ (Japan) OrigamiSat-2	Tokyo Institute of Technology	Low Earth (SSO)	TBA	In orbit	Operational
23 April; 03:09:00	⚀ (Japan) Prelude	Nihon University	Low Earth (SSO)	TBA	In orbit	Operational
23 April; 03:09:00	⚀ (Japan) WASEDA-SAT-ZERO-II	Waseda University	Low Earth (SSO)	TBA	In orbit	Operational
23 April; 03:09:00	Part of the Innovative Satellite Technology Demonstration-4 mission.					
23 April; 03:23:00	(United States) Falcon 9 Block 5	Starlink Group 17-14	(United States) Vandenberg SLC-4E		(United States) SpaceX	
23 April; 03:23:00	(United States) Starlink × 25	SpaceX	Low Earth	Communications	In orbit	Operational
23 April; 08:29	(Russia) Angara-1.2		(Russia) Plesetsk Site 35/1		(Russia) RVSN RF	
23 April; 08:29	(Russia) Kosmos 2617 (OO MKA №7)	VKS	Low Earth (SSO)	TBA	In orbit	Operational
23 April; 08:29	(Russia) Kosmos 2618 (OO MKA №8)	VKS	Low Earth (SSO)	TBA	In orbit	Operational
23 April; 08:29	(Russia) Kosmos 2619 (OO MKA №9)	VKS	Low Earth (SSO)	TBA	In orbit	Operational
23 April; 08:29	(Russia) Kosmos 2620 (OO MKA №10)	VKS	Low Earth (SSO)	TBA	In orbit	Operational
24 April; 06:35:00	(China) Long March 2D	2D-Y109	(China) Xichang LC-3		(China) CASC	
24 April; 06:35:00	(China) Hulianwang Jishu Shiyan 9A	CAST	Low Earth (SSO)	Communications	In orbit	Operational
24 April; 06:35:00	(China) Hulianwang Jishu Shiyan 9B	CAST	Low Earth (SSO)	Communications	In orbit	Operational
24 April; 06:35:00	(China) Hulianwang Jishu Shiyan 9C	CAST	Low Earth (SSO)	Communications	In orbit	Operational
24 April; 06:35:00	(China) Hulianwang Jishu Shiyan 9D	CAST	Low Earth (SSO)	Communications	In orbit	Operational
25 April; 12:15:00	(China) Long March 6		(China) Taiyuan LA-9A		(China) CASC	
25 April; 12:15:00	(Pakistan) PRSC-EO3	SUPARCO	Low Earth	TBA	In orbit	Operational
25 April; 22:21:47	(Russia) Soyuz-2.1a		(Kazakhstan) Baikonur Site 31/6		(Russia) Roscosmos	
25 April; 22:21:47	(Russia) Progress MS-34 / 94P	Roscosmos	Low Earth (ISS)	ISS logistics	In orbit	Docked to ISS
26 April; 14:37:09	(United States) Falcon 9 Block 5	Starlink Group 17-16	(United States) Vandenberg SLC-4E		(United States) SpaceX	
26 April; 14:37:09	(United States) Starlink × 25	SpaceX	Low Earth	Communications	In orbit	Operational
28 April; 00:53:30	(United States) Atlas V 551	LA-06/Leo-6	(United States) Cape Canaveral SLC-41		(United States) ULA	
28 April; 00:53:30	(United States) KuiperSat × 29	Amazon Leo	Low Earth	Communications	In orbit	Operational
28 April; 00:53:30	Seventh of nine Amazon Leo launches on Atlas V.					
29 April; 14:13:00	(United States) Falcon Heavy	FH-012	(United States) Kennedy LC-39A		(United States) SpaceX	
29 April; 14:13:00	(United States) ViaSat-3 APAC	ViaSat	Geosynchronous	Communications	In orbit	Operational
29 April; 14:13:00	Originally intended to launch on the first flight of the Ariane 64 configuration.					
30 April; 02:42:49	(United States) Falcon 9 Block 5	Starlink Group 17-36	(United States) Vandenberg SLC-4E		(United States) SpaceX	
30 April; 02:42:49	(United States) Starlink × 25	SpaceX	Low Earth	Communications	In orbit	Operational
30 April; 08:57:00	(France) Ariane 64	VA268/LE-02	(France) Kourou ELA-4		(France) Arianespace	
30 April; 08:57:00	(United States) KuiperSat × 32	Amazon Leo	Low Earth	Communications	In orbit	Operational
30 April; 08:57:00	Second of 18 Ariane 6 launches for Amazon's Amazon Leo.					

- ← Jan
- Feb
- Mar
- Apr
- May
- Jun
- Jul
- Aug
- Sep
- Oct
- Nov
- Dec →

=== May ===
Date and time (UTC)	Rocket	Flight number	Launch site		LSP	
Date and time (UTC)	Payload (⚀ = CubeSat)	Operator	Orbit	Function	Decay (UTC)	Outcome
Date and time (UTC)	Remarks					
1 May; 18:06:10	(United States) Falcon 9 Block 5	Starlink Group 10-38	(United States) Cape Canaveral SLC-40		(United States) SpaceX	
1 May; 18:06:10	(United States) Starlink × 29	SpaceX	Low Earth	Communications	In orbit	Operational
3 May; 07:00:00	(United States) Falcon 9 Block 5	F9-635	(United States) Vandenberg SLC-4E		(United States) SpaceX	
3 May; 07:00:00	(South Korea) CAS500-2	KASA	Low Earth (SSO)	Earth observation	In orbit	Operational
3 May; 07:00:00	(South Korea) BusanSat	Busan Metropolitan City / KASA	Low Earth (SSO)	Earth observation	In orbit	Operational
3 May; 07:00:00	(India) Drishti	GalaxEye	Low Earth (SSO)	Earth observation	In orbit	Operational
3 May; 07:00:00	(Canada) EarthDaily × 6	EarthDaily	Low Earth (SSO)	Earth observation	In orbit	Operational
3 May; 07:00:00	(Poland) Eycore-1	Eycore	Low Earth (SSO)	Earth observation	In orbit	Operational
3 May; 07:00:00	(Finland) (Poland) (Portugal) ICEYE-X78, X82	ICEYE	Low Earth (SSO)	Earth observation	In orbit	Operational
3 May; 07:00:00	(Italy) IRIDE-MS2-HEO 7, 10-15	ASI	Low Earth (SSO)	Earth observation	In orbit	Operational
3 May; 07:00:00	(United States) Jackal Autonomous Orbital Vehicle	True Anomaly	Low Earth (SSO)	TBA	In orbit	Operational
3 May; 07:00:00	(United Kingdom) JEN-1	OrbAstro	Low Earth (SSO)	Technology demonstration	In orbit	Operational
3 May; 07:00:00	(United States) Lynk Tower 7, 8	Lynk Global	Low Earth (SSO)	Communications	In orbit	Operational
3 May; 07:00:00	(Singapore) NuLink-1, 2	NuSpace	Low Earth (SSO)	Communications	In orbit	Operational
3 May; 07:00:00	(United States) Pelican-7, 8, 9	Planet Labs	Low Earth (SSO)	Earth observation	In orbit	Operational
3 May; 07:00:00	⚀ (Bulgaria) (European Union) Balkan-2	EnduroSat / Copernicus	Low Earth (SSO)	Earth observation	In orbit	Operational
3 May; 07:00:00	⚀ (France) BRO 21	Unseenlabs	Low Earth (SSO)	Radio frequency spectrum monitoring	In orbit	Operational
3 May; 07:00:00	⚀ (United States) BSLT-1, 2 & 3	Basalt Space	Low Earth (SSO)	TBA	In orbit	Operational
3 May; 07:00:00	⚀ (Germany) (Greece) (European Union) FOREST-16, 17, 18, 19	OroraTech / HSC / Copernicus	Low Earth (SSO)	Earth observation	In orbit	Operational
3 May; 07:00:00	⚀ (Canada) FrontierSat	University of Calgary	Low Earth (SSO)	Educational / Auroral science	In orbit	Operational
3 May; 07:00:00	⚀ (Taiwan) Gemini-Pollux	NCKU	Low Earth (SSO)	Educational / Amateur radio	In orbit	Operational
3 May; 07:00:00	⚀ (Greece) HELIOS	EMTECH SPACE	Low Earth (SSO)	Technology demonstration	In orbit	Operational
3 May; 07:00:00	⚀ (Spain) Hydra-3	Aistech Space	Low Earth (SSO)	Earth observation	In orbit	Operational
3 May; 07:00:00	⚀ (Germany) ICARUS 2.0 - RAVEN	TALOS / Max Planck Society	Low Earth (SSO)	Animal movement and environmental data collection	In orbit	Operational
3 May; 07:00:00	⚀ (Taiwan) PEARL-1A, 1B	NCU	Low Earth (SSO)	Educational / Technology demonstration	In orbit	Operational
3 May; 07:00:00	⚀ (Germany) QUBE-II	BMFTR	Low Earth (SSO)	Technology demonstration	In orbit	Operational
3 May; 07:00:00	⚀ (Greece) SELENE	EMTECH SPACE	Low Earth (SSO)	Technology demonstration	In orbit	Operational
3 May; 07:00:00	⚀ (United States) SNAPPY	WSU	Low Earth (SSO)	Measurement of solar neutrinos	In orbit	Operational
6 May; 03:59:19	(United States) Falcon 9 Block 5	Starlink Group 17-29	(United States) Vandenberg SLC-4E		(United States) SpaceX	
6 May; 03:59:19	(United States) Starlink × 24	SpaceX	Low Earth	Communications	In orbit	Operational
11 May; 00:14:32	(China) Long March 7		(China) Wenchang LC-2		(China) CASC	
11 May; 00:14:32	(China) Tianzhou 10	CMSA	Low Earth (TSS)	TSS logistics	In orbit	Docked to TSS
12 May; 02:13:50	(United States) Falcon 9 Block 5	F9-637	(United States) Vandenberg SLC-4E		(United States) SpaceX	
12 May; 02:13:50	(United States) USA-586 - USA-607 (Starshield Group 1-12)	TBA	Low Earth (SSO)	Communications	In orbit	Operational
12 May; 02:13:50	NROL-172 (NRO Proliferated Architecture Mission). Thirteenth batch of SpaceX/Northrop built 9 Starshield satellites for the National Reconnaissance Office.					
12 May; 11:59:00	(China) Long March 6A	Y23 / Spacesail Polar Group 08	(China) Taiyuan		(China) CASC	
12 May; 11:59:00	(China) Qianfan × 18	SSST	Low Earth (Polar)	Communications	In orbit	Operational
14 May; 03:00:00	(China) Zhuque-2E	Y5	(China) Jiuquan Site 96		(China) Land Space	
14 May; 03:00:00	(China) Dingzhihua Shiyan Zaihe	Land Space	Low Earth (SSO)	Mass Simulator	In orbit	In orbit
14 May; 03:00:00	Return to flight after August 2025 failure.					
15 May; 04:33:00	(China) Kinetica 1	Y13	(China) Jiuquan LS-130		(China) CAS Space	
15 May; 04:33:00	(China) Jilin-1 Gaofen 03D55	CAS	Low Earth (SSO)	Earth observation	In orbit	Operational
15 May; 04:33:00	(China) Taijing-3-05A - B / Rongcheng-1-01 - 02	MinoSpace	Low Earth (SSO)	Earth observation	In orbit	Operational
15 May; 04:33:00	(China) Tianyan-27 / Youxi	MinoSpace	Low Earth (SSO)	Technology demonstration	In orbit	Operational
15 May; 04:33:00	(China) Tianyi-50 / Dianjian-1	PowerChina	Low Earth (SSO)	Earth observation	In orbit	Operational
15 May; 22:05:41	(United States) Falcon 9 Block 5		(United States) Cape Canaveral SLC-40		(United States) SpaceX	
15 May; 22:05:41	(United States) SpaceX CRS-34	NASA	Low Earth (ISS)	ISS logistics	In orbit	Docked to ISS
15 May; 22:05:41	Payloads in trunk: CLARREO-PF and STP-H11.					
17 May; 14:42:00	(China) Long March 8	Y8	(China) Wenchang Commercial LC-1		(China) CASC	
17 May; 14:42:00	(China) Qianfan x 18	SSST	Low Earth (Polar)	Communications	In orbit	Operational
19 May; 03:52:10	(Italy) Vega-C	VV29	(France) Kourou ELV		(Italy) Avio	
19 May; 03:52:10	(China) SMILE	CAS / ESA	Highly elliptical	Earth observation	In orbit	Operational
19 May; 03:52:10	First Vega launch to be operated under the responsibility of Avio.					
20 May; 02:11:00	(United States) Falcon 9 Block 5	Starlink Group 17-42	(United States) Vandenberg SLC-4E		(United States) SpaceX	
20 May; 02:11:00	(United States) Starlink × 24	SpaceX	Low Earth	Communications	In orbit	Operational
21 May; 10:04:20	(United States) Falcon 9 Block 5	Starlink Group 10-31	(United States) Cape Canaveral SLC-40		(United States) SpaceX	
21 May; 10:04:20	(United States) Starlink × 29	SpaceX	Low Earth	Communications	In orbit	Operational
22 May; 09:33:00	(United States) Electron	"Viva La StriX"	(New Zealand) Mahia LC-1		(United States) Rocket Lab	
22 May; 09:33:00	(Japan) StriX-7	Synspective	Low Earth	Earth observation	In orbit	Operational
22 May; 09:33:00	Ninth of 16 dedicated launches for Synspective's StriX constellation.					
24 May; 15:08:36	(China) Long March 2F	Y23	(China) Jiuquan SLS-1		(China) CASC	
24 May; 15:08:36	(China) Shenzhou 23	CMSA	Low Earth (TSS)	Human spaceflight	In orbit	Docked to TSS
25 May; 11:48:04	(United States) Falcon 9 Block 5	Starlink Group 10-47	(United States) Cape Canaveral SLC-40		(United States) SpaceX	
25 May; 11:48:04	(United States) Starlink × 29	SpaceX	Low Earth	Communications	In orbit	Operational
26 May; 14:00:00	(United States) Falcon 9 Block 5	Starlink Group 17-37	(United States) Vandenberg SLC-4E		(United States) SpaceX	
26 May; 14:00:00	(United States) Starlink × 24	SpaceX	Low Earth	Communications	In orbit	Operational
26 May; 16:15:00	(China) Long March 7A	7A-Y12	(China) Wenchang LC-2		(China) CASC	
26 May; 16:15:00	(China) TJSW-24	TBA	Geosynchronous	Communications / Technology demonstration	In orbit	Operational
29 May; 12:57:00	(United States) Falcon 9 Block 5	Starlink Group 10-53	(United States) Cape Canaveral SLC-40		(United States) SpaceX	
29 May; 12:57:00	(United States) Starlink × 29	SpaceX	Low Earth	Communications	In orbit	Operational
29 May; 23:53:00	(United States) Atlas V 551	LA-07/Leo-7	(United States) Cape Canaveral SLC-41		(United States) ULA	
29 May; 23:53:00	(United States) KuiperSat × 29	Amazon Leo	Low Earth	Communications	In orbit	Operational
29 May; 23:53:00	Eighth of nine Amazon Leo launches on Atlas V.					
30 May; 15:25:00	(United States) Falcon 9 Block 5	Starlink Group 17-41	(United States) Vandenberg SLC-4E		(United States) SpaceX	
30 May; 15:25:00	(United States) Starlink × 24	SpaceX	Low Earth	Communications	In orbit	Operational
30 May; 18:07:00	(China) Long March 2D	2D-Y119	(China) Xichang LC-3		(China) CASC	
30 May; 18:07:00	(China) Hulianwang Jishu Shiyan 10A	CAST	Low Earth	Communications	In orbit	Operational
30 May; 18:07:00	(China) Hulianwang Jishu Shiyan 10B	CAST	Low Earth	Communications	In orbit	Operational
30 May; 18:07:00	(China) Hulianwang Jishu Shiyan 10C	CAST	Low Earth	Communications	In orbit	Operational
30 May; 18:07:00	(China) Hulianwang Jishu Shiyan 10D	CAST	Low Earth	Communications	In orbit	Operational

- ← Jan
- Feb
- Mar
- Apr
- May
- Jun
- Jul
- Aug
- Sep
- Oct
- Nov
- Dec →

=== June ===
Date and time (UTC)	Rocket	Flight number	Launch site		LSP	
Date and time (UTC)	Payload (⚀ = CubeSat)	Operator	Orbit	Function	Decay (UTC)	Outcome
Date and time (UTC)	Remarks					
1 June; 08:40:00	(China) Long March 12B	12B-Y1	(China) Jiuquan		(China) CASC	
1 June; 08:40:00	(China) Qianfan × 2	SSST	Low Earth (Polar)	Communications	In orbit	Operational
1 June; 08:40:00	Maiden flight of Long March 12B.					
3 June; 15:40:39	(United States) Falcon 9 Block 5	Starlink Group 17-47	(United States) Vandenberg SLC-4E		(United States) SpaceX	
3 June; 15:40:39	(United States) Starlink × 24	SpaceX	Low Earth	Communications	In orbit	Operational
4 June; 10:26:30	(United States) Falcon 9 Block 5	Starlink Group 10-43	(United States) Cape Canaveral SLC-40		(United States) SpaceX	
4 June; 10:26:30	(United States) Starlink × 29	SpaceX	Low Earth	Communications	In orbit	Operational
4 June; 11:39:00	(China) Long March 6A	6A-Y25	(China) Taiyuan LA-9A		(China) CASC	
4 June; 11:39:00	(China) Qianfan × 18	SSST	Low Earth (Polar)	Communications	In orbit	Operational
5 June; 05:00:00	(China) Long March 8	8-Y9	(China) Wenchang Commercial LC-1		(China) CASC	
5 June; 05:00:00	(China) Qianfan × 18	SSST	Low Earth (Polar)	Communications	In orbit	Operational
7 June; 04:24:45	(United States) Falcon 9 Block 5	Starlink Group 17-43	(United States) Vandenberg SLC-4E		(United States) SpaceX	
7 June; 04:24:45	(United States) Starlink × 24	SpaceX	Low Earth	Communications	In orbit	Operational
7 June; 04:24:45	(United States) USA-608 (Starshield Group 2-5)	TBA	Low Earth (SSO)	Communications	In orbit	Operational
7 June; 04:24:45	(United States) USA-609 (Starshield Group 2-5)	TBA	Low Earth (SSO)	Communications	In orbit	Operational
8 June; 10:13:50	(United States) Falcon 9 Block 5	Starlink Group 10-35	(United States) Cape Canaveral SLC-40		(United States) SpaceX	
8 June; 10:13:50	(United States) Starlink × 29	SpaceX	Low Earth	Communications	In orbit	Operational
9 June; 08:23:00	(China) Zhuque-2E	Y6	(China) Jiuquan Site 96		(China) Land Space	
9 June; 08:23:00	(China) Qianfan DTC 01	SSST	Low Earth	Communications	In orbit	Operational
9 June; 08:23:00	China Mobile 02	TBA	Low Earth	Communications	In orbit	Operational
11 June; 07:30:00	(China) Long March 5	5-Y11	(China) Wenchang LC-1		(China) CASC	
11 June; 07:30:00	(China) TJS-25	TBA	Geosynchronous	TBA	In orbit	Operational
11 June; 08:00	(United States) HASTE	CURVEBALL	(United States) MARS LC-2		(United States) Rocket Lab	
11 June; 08:00	(United States) CURVEBALL	Hypersonix	Low Earth	Reentry test	11 June	Successful
11 June; 08:00	Reentry test under Rocket Lab’s Hypersonic Accelerator Suborbital Test Electron (HASTE) program. Both rocket stages and payload achieved orbit.					
11 June; 15:05:00	(United States) Falcon 9 Block 5	Starlink Group 17-44	(United States) Vandenberg SLC-4E		(United States) SpaceX	
11 June; 15:05:00	(United States) Starlink × 24	SpaceX	Low Earth	Communications	In orbit	Operational
12 June; 00:53:59	(Japan) H3-30S	F6	(Japan) Tanegashima LA-Y2		(Japan) JAXA	
12 June; 00:53:59	(Japan) VEP-5	JAXA	Low Earth to Suborbital	Launch vehicle evaluation	12 June 2026	Successful
12 June; 00:53:59	(Japan) PETREL	Institute of Science Tokyo	Low Earth	Earth observation Astronomy	In orbit	Operational
12 June; 00:53:59	(Japan) STARS-X	Shizuoka University	Low Earth	Technology demonstration	In orbit	Operational
12 June; 00:53:59	⚀ (France) BRO-22	UnseenLabs	Low Earth	SIGINT	In orbit	Operational
12 June; 00:53:59	⚀ (Japan) HORN L, R	BULL	Low Earth	Technology demonstration	In orbit	Operational
12 June; 00:53:59	⚀ (Japan) VERTECS	Kyushu Institute of Technology	Low Earth	Astronomy	In orbit	Operational
12 June; 00:53:59	Maiden flight of H3-30S Variant. PETREL and STARS-X are part of the Innovative Satellite Technology Demonstration-3 mission.					
12 June; 12:37:00	(United States) Falcon 9 Block 5	Starlink Group 10-54	(United States) Cape Canaveral SLC-40		(United States) SpaceX	
12 June; 12:37:00	(United States) Starlink × 29	SpaceX	Low Earth	Communications	In orbit	Operational
15 June; 03:44:00	(China) Kinetica 1	Y14	(China) Jiuquan LS-130		(China) CAS Space	
15 June; 03:44:00	(China) Jilin-1 Gaofen-04D 01-02	TBA	Low Earth (SSO)	Earth observation	In orbit	Operational
15 June; 03:44:00	(China) Jilin-1 Gaofen-05D 01-02	TBA	Low Earth (SSO)	Earth observation	In orbit	Operational
15 June; 03:44:00	(China) Jilin-1 Gaofen-07C 04	TBA	Low Earth (SSO)	Earth observation	In orbit	Operational
15 June; 03:44:00	(China) Jilin-1 Gaofen-07D 02-04	TBA	Low Earth (SSO)	Earth observation	In orbit	Operational
15 June; 15:34:35	(United States) Falcon 9 Block 5	Starlink Group 17-54	(United States) Vandenberg SLC-4E		(United States) SpaceX	
15 June; 15:34:35	(United States) Starlink × 24	SpaceX	Low Earth (SSO)	Communications	In orbit	Operational
16 June; 09:45:00	(China) Long March 3B/E	3B-Y?	(China) Xichang LC-2		(China) CASC	
16 June; 09:45:00	(China) Shijian-31	TBA	Geosynchronous	TBA	In orbit	Operational
16 June; 09:45:00	Return to flight of Long March 3B.					
17 June; 02:44:00	(China) Long March 12	Y7	(China) Wenchang Commercial LC-2		(China) CASC	
17 June; 02:44:00	(China) Guowang × 9	CAST	Low Earth	Communications	In orbit	Operational
17 June; 03:40:00	(China) Kuaizhou 11	Y13	(China) Jiuquan LS-95A		(China) Expace	
17 June; 03:40:00	(China) TBA	TBA	Low Earth (SSO)	TBA	In orbit	Operational
17 June; 06:39:00	(United States) Falcon 9 Block 5	F9-652	(United States) Cape Canaveral SLC-40		(United States) SpaceX	
17 June; 06:39:00	(United States) BlueBird 8	AST SpaceMobile	Low Earth	Communications	In orbit	Operational
17 June; 06:39:00	(United States) BlueBird 9	AST SpaceMobile	Low Earth	Communications	In orbit	Operational
17 June; 06:39:00	(United States) BlueBird 10	AST SpaceMobile	Low Earth	Communications	In orbit	Operational
17 June; 12:21:52	(France) Ariane 64 Block 2	VA269/LE-03	(France) Kourou ELA-4		(France) Arianespace	
17 June; 12:21:52	(United States) LeoSat × 36	Amazon Leo	Low Earth	Communications	In orbit	Operational
17 June; 12:21:52	First Ariane 6 launch with upgraded P160C solid rocket boosters. Third of 18 Ariane 6 launches for Amazon's Amazon Leo.					
19 June; 08:50:00	(United States) Falcon 9 Block 5	F9-653	(United States) Vandenberg SLC-4E		(United States) SpaceX	
19 June; 08:50:00	(United States) USA-610 - USA-618 (Starshield Group 1-13)	TBA	Low Earth (SSO)	Communications	In orbit	Operational
19 June; 08:50:00	NROL-179 Mission (NRO Proliferated Architecture Mission). Fourteenth batch of SpaceX/Northrop built 9 Starshield satellites for the National Reconnaissance Office.					
19 June; 10:19:00	(United States) Electron		(New Zealand) Mahia LC-1		(United States) Rocket Lab	
19 June; 10:19:00	(United States) Puma	Space Systems Command	Low Earth	Space domain awareness	In orbit	Operational
19 June; 10:19:00	Tactically Responsive Space-4 (TacRS-4)/VICTUS HAZE Mission.					
21 June; 14:00:00	(United States) Falcon 9 Block 5	Starlink Group 17-28	(United States) Vandenberg SLC-4E		(United States) SpaceX	
21 June; 14:00:00	(United States) Starlink × 24	SpaceX	Low Earth (SSO)	Communications	In orbit	Operational
23 June; 02:00:00	(China) Long March 7A	7A-Y?	(China) Wenchang LC-2		(China) CASC	
23 June; 02:00:00	(China) TJS-26A	TBA	Geosynchronous	TBA	In orbit	Operational
23 June; 10:53:00	(United States) Falcon 9 Block 5	F9-655	(United States) Cape Canaveral SLC-40		(United States) SpaceX	
23 June; 10:53:00	(United States) Starfall Demo	SpaceX	Low Earth	Technology demonstration	23 June	Successful
25 June; 03:30:38	(United States) Falcon 9 Block 5	Starlink Group 17-45	(United States) Vandenberg SLC-4E		(United States) SpaceX	
25 June; 03:30:38	(United States) Starlink × 24	SpaceX	Low Earth (SSO)	Communications	In orbit	Operational
25 June; 03:30:38	400th Starlink launch.					
26 June; 16:45:00	(United States) Electron	Ten Owl Of Ten	(New Zealand) Mahia LC-1		(United States) Rocket Lab	
26 June; 16:45:00	(Japan) StriX-8	Synspective	Low Earth	Earth observation	In orbit	Operational
26 June; 16:45:00	10th of 26 dedicated launches for Synspective's StriX constellation.					
28 June; 16:09:18	(United States) Falcon 9 Block 5	Starlink Group 17-40	(United States) Vandenberg SLC-4E		(United States) SpaceX	
28 June; 16:09:18	(United States) Starlink × 24	SpaceX	Low Earth (SSO)	Communications	In orbit	Operational
29 June; 02:25:00	(United States) Falcon 9 Block 5	F9-658	(United States) Cape Canaveral SLC-40		(United States) SpaceX	
29 June; 02:25:00	(United States) SXM-11	SiriusXM	Geosynchronous	Communications	In orbit	Operational

- ← Jan
- Feb
- Mar
- Apr
- May
- Jun
- Jul
- Aug
- Sep
- Oct
- Nov
- Dec →

== Suborbital flights ==
Date and time (UTC)	Rocket	Flight number	Launch site		LSP	
Date and time (UTC)	Payload (⚀ = CubeSat)	Operator	Orbit	Function	Decay (UTC)	Outcome
Date and time (UTC)	Remarks					
22 April; 01:36	(United States) HASTE	BUBBLES	(United States) MARS LC-2		(United States) Rocket Lab	
22 April; 01:36	BUBBLES	Hypersonix	Suborbital	Reentry test	22 April	Successful
22 April; 01:36	Sub-orbital launch under Rocket Lab’s Hypersonic Accelerator Suborbital Test Electron (HASTE) program.					
30 April; 18:00:00	(Russia) Irtysh / DM-SLB		(Kazakhstan) Baikonur Site 45/1		(Russia) Roscosmos	
30 April; 18:00:00	Dummy payload	Roscosmos	Suborbital	Flight test	30 April	Successful
30 April; 18:00:00	First launch of Irtysh, also known as Soyuz-5. A dummy payload matching a future satellite in weight and size was launched.					
12 May	(Russia) RS-28 Sarmat		(Russia) Dombarovsky		(Russia) RVSN	
12 May	(Russia)	RVSN	Suborbital	Missile test	12 May	Successful
14 May; 19:23	(Canada) Black Brant IX		(United States) Poker Flat Research Range		(United States) NASA	
14 May; 19:23	(United States) FOXSI-5	University of California, Berkeley	Suborbital	Solar observation	14 May	Successful
14 May; 19:23	Focusing Optics X-ray Solar Imager (FOXSI).					
20 May; 08:01	(United States) Minuteman III	GT-256GM	(United States) Vandenberg LF-09?		(United States) AFGSC	
20 May; 08:01	(United States)	AFGSC	Suborbital	Test flight	20 May	Successful
20 May; 08:01	Re-entered ~4,200 mi (6,800 km) downrange near Kwajalein Atoll.					
21 May; 22:30:20	(United States) Starship	Flight 12	(United States) Starbase Pad 2		(United States) SpaceX	
21 May; 22:30:20	(United States) Starlink simulators × 20	SpaceX	Transatmospheric	Mass simulator	21 May	Successful
21 May; 22:30:20	(United States) Starlink demonstrators × 2	SpaceX	Transatmospheric	Vehicle evaluation	21 May	Successful
21 May; 22:30:20	Twelfth Starship flight test. First flight of Starship Block 3 and the first launch from Pad 2 at Starbase. It repeated the same flight profile as the previous flights, with the ship falling slightly short of reaching orbit.					
31 May; 06:33	(Germany) Red Kite/Red Kite	S1X-5/M17	(Sweden) Esrange		(Sweden) SSC Space / (Germany) DLR	
31 May; 06:33	(Sweden) MASER-17	SSC Space	Suborbital	Microgravity research	31 May	Successful
31 May; 06:33	SubOrbital Express-5. Apogee: 260 km (160 mi).					
10 June; 11:51	(Netherlands) T-minus Barracuda		(Canada) Spaceport Nova Scotia		(Canada) Maritime Launch Services	
10 June; 11:51			Suborbital		10 June	Launch failure
10 June; 11:51	Rocket did not reach the targeted altitude					
24 June; 09:30	(United States) Terrier-Improved Malemute		(United States) Wallops Flight Facility		(United States) NASA	
24 June; 09:30	(United States) RockSat-C/RockOn	Wallops Flight Facility	Suborbital	Education	24 June	Successful
24 June; 09:30	Mission 46.044WO ?, apogee: 119 km (74 mi)					
26 June; 17:11	(United States) Castor 4BXL		(United States) Wallops Flight Facility		(United States) DoD	
26 June; 17:11	(United States) SHORTSTOP	Wallops Flight Facility	Suborbital	Technology demonstration	26 June	Successful
26 June; 17:11	Hypersonic Research?, apogee: 300 km (190 mi)?					
