= List of spaceflight launches in January–March 2026 =

This article lists orbital and suborbital launches during the first quarter of the year 2026.

For all other spaceflight activities, see 2026 in spaceflight. For launches during the rest of 2026, see List of spaceflight launches in April–June 2026, List of spaceflight launches in July–September 2026, and List of spaceflight launches in October–December 2026.

- ← Jan
- Feb
- Mar
- Apr
- May
- Jun
- Jul
- Aug
- Sep
- Oct
- Nov
- Dec →

== Orbital launches ==
=== January ===
Date and time (UTC)	Rocket	Flight number	Launch site		LSP	
Date and time (UTC)	Payload (⚀ = CubeSat)	Operator	Orbit	Function	Decay (UTC)	Outcome
Date and time (UTC)	Remarks					
3 January; 02:09:16	(United States) Falcon 9 Block 5	F9-583	(United States) Vandenberg SLC-4E		(United States) SpaceX	
3 January; 02:09:16	(Italy) CSG-3	ASI	Low Earth (SSO)	Earth observation	In orbit	Operational
3 January; 02:09:16	Third COSMO-SkyMed 2nd Generation satellite.					
4 January; 06:48:10	(United States) Falcon 9 Block 5	Starlink Group 6-88	(United States) Cape Canaveral SLC-40		(United States) SpaceX	
4 January; 06:48:10	(United States) Starlink × 29	SpaceX	Low Earth	Communications	In orbit	Operational
9 January; 21:41:00	(United States) Falcon 9 Block 5	Starlink Group 6-96	(United States) Cape Canaveral SLC-40		(United States) SpaceX	
9 January; 21:41:00	(United States) Starlink × 29	SpaceX	Low Earth	Communications	In orbit	Operational
11 January; 13:44:50	(United States) Falcon 9 Block 5	Twilight	(United States) Vandenberg SLC-4E		(United States) SpaceX	
11 January; 13:44:50	(United States) Pandora	NASA	Low Earth (SSO)	Space telescope	In orbit	Operational
11 January; 13:44:50	(Canada) Aether 3-12	Kepler Communications	Low Earth (SSO)	Communications	In orbit	Operational
11 January; 13:44:50	(United States) Capella 18 (Acadia 8)	Capella Space	Low Earth (SSO)	Earth observation	In orbit	Operational
11 January; 13:44:50	(United States) Capella 19 (Acadia 9)	Capella Space	Low Earth (SSO)	Earth observation	In orbit	Operational
11 January; 13:44:50	(United Kingdom) CarbSAR-IOD	SSTL	Low Earth (SSO)	Earth observation	In orbit	Operational
11 January; 13:44:50	(Germany) Flamingo 1	Vyoma	Low Earth (SSO)	Space Surveillance	In orbit	Operational
11 January; 13:44:50	(United States) Hawk 13A-C	HawkEye 360	Low Earth (SSO)	SIGINT	In orbit	Operational
11 January; 13:44:50	(Finland) ICEYE X63	ICEYE	Low Earth (SSO)	Earth observation	In orbit	Operational
11 January; 13:44:50	(Finland) ICEYE X64	ICEYE	Low Earth (SSO)	Earth observation	In orbit	Operational
11 January; 13:44:50	(United States) Umbra-SAR 12	Umbra Lab	Low Earth (SSO)	Earth observation	In orbit	Operational
11 January; 13:44:50	⚀ (United States) BlackCAT	NASA	Low Earth (SSO)	Space telescope	In orbit	Operational
11 January; 13:44:50	⚀ (Turkey) Conecta-IoT 13-16	Plan-S	Low Earth (SSO)	Communications	In orbit	Operational
11 January; 13:44:50	⚀ (United States) Dcubed-1/Araqys-D1	TBA	Low Earth (SSO)	TBA	In orbit	Operational
11 January; 13:44:50	⚀ (Spain) Hydra-2	Aistech	Low Earth (SSO)	Earth observation	In orbit	Operational
11 January; 13:44:50	⚀ (United States) HyMS-IOD (Lemur-2)	Spire Global	Low Earth (SSO)	Technology demonstration	In orbit	Operational
11 January; 13:44:50	⚀ (United States) Lemur-2 × 8	Spire Global	Low Earth (SSO)	Earth observation	In orbit	Operational
11 January; 13:44:50	⚀ (United States) SPARCS	ASU	Low Earth (SSO)	Space telescope	In orbit	Operational
11 January; 13:44:50	⚀ (United States) Tomorrow S10-S11	Tomorrow.io	Low Earth (SSO)	Meteorology	In orbit	Operational
11 January; 13:44:50	Mission Designated:"Twilight".					
12 January; 04:48:30	(India) PSLV-DL	C62	(India) Satish Dhawan FLP		(India) NSIL	
12 January; 04:48:30	(India) EOS-N1 (ANVESHA)	DRDO	Low Earth (SSO)	Earth observation	12 January	Launch failure
12 January; 04:48:30	(India) Aayulsat	OrbitAID	Low Earth (SSO)	Technology demonstration	12 January	Launch failure
12 January; 04:48:30	(Spain) KID	Orbital Paradigm	Low Earth (SSO)	Re-entry Capsule	12 January	Partial success
12 January; 04:48:30	(Thailand) THEOS-2A	GISTDA	Low Earth (SSO)	Earth observation	12 January	Launch failure
12 January; 04:48:30	⚀ (Brazil) Aldebaran-1	Federal University of Maranhão	Low Earth (SSO)	Amateur radio	12 January	Launch failure
12 January; 04:48:30	⚀ (India) CGUSat	CV Raman Global University	Low Earth (SSO)	Technology demonstration / Amateur radio	12 January	Launch failure
12 January; 04:48:30	⚀ (India) DUSAT-1	Dayanand Sagar University	Low Earth (SSO)	Technology demonstration / Amateur radio	12 January	Launch failure
12 January; 04:48:30	⚀ (India) LACHIT-1	Assam Don Bosco University	Low Earth (SSO)	Amateur radio / Educational	12 January	Launch failure
12 January; 04:48:30	⚀ (India) MOI-1	TakeMe2Space	Low Earth (SSO)	Technology demonstration	12 January	Launch failure
12 January; 04:48:30	⚀ (Nepal) Munal	NAST / APN	Low Earth (SSO)	Earth observation	12 January	Launch failure
12 January; 04:48:30	⚀ (India) SanskarSat	Laxman Gyanpith School	Low Earth (SSO)	Educational	12 January	Launch failure
12 January; 04:48:30	⚀ (India) Thybolt 3	Dhruva Space	Low Earth (SSO)	Technology demonstration / Amateur radio	12 January	Launch failure
12 January; 04:48:30	▫ (Brazil) EduSat	TBA	Low Earth (SSO)	IoT	12 January	Launch failure
12 January; 04:48:30	▫ (Brazil) GalaxySat-1	Galaxy Explorer	Low Earth (SSO)	Study Lightning Formation	12 January	Launch failure
12 January; 04:48:30	▫ (Brazil) Orbital Temple	Edson Pavoni	Low Earth (SSO)	Art Project	12 January	Launch failure
12 January; 04:48:30	▫ (Brazil) UaiSat	Federal University of São João del-Rei	Low Earth (SSO)	Amateur radio / Lightning Detection	12 January	Launch failure
12 January; 04:48:30	Return to flight of PSLV after a launch failure on 18 May 2025. Rocket failed during third stage flight. Orbital Paradigm's KID reentry capsule managed to separate and transmitted engineering data for three minutes, but no customer data. All other spacecraft were lost. Rocket presumed to have crashed around 75°E, 18°S over the Southern Indian Ocean.					
12 January; 21:08:20	(United States) Falcon 9 Block 5	Starlink Group 6-97	(United States) Cape Canaveral SLC-40		(United States) SpaceX	
12 January; 21:08:20	(United States) Starlink × 29	SpaceX	Low Earth	Communications	In orbit	Operational
13 January; 14:16:00	(China) Long March 6A	6A-Y27	(China) Taiyuan LA-9A		(China) CASC	
13 January; 14:16:00	(China) Yaogan-50 01	TBA	Low Earth (Retrograde)	TBA	In orbit	Operational
13 January; 15:25:00	(China) Long March 8A	8A-Y7/SatNet LEO Group 18	(China) Wenchang Commercial LC-1		(China) CASC	
13 January; 15:25:00	(China) Guowang × 9	CAST	Low Earth	Communications	In orbit	Operational
14 January; 18:08:20	(United States) Falcon 9 Block 5	Starlink Group 6-98	(United States) Cape Canaveral SLC-40		(United States) SpaceX	
14 January; 18:08:20	(United States) Starlink × 29	SpaceX	Low Earth	Communications	In orbit	Operational
15 January; 04:01:00	(China) Long March 2C	2C-Y?	(China) Jiuquan SLS-2		(China) CASC	
15 January; 04:01:00	(Algeria) AlSat-3A	Algerian Space Agency	Low Earth (SSO)	Earth observation	In orbit	Operational
15 January; 20:10:00	(China) Ceres-1S	Y7	(China) Special Launch Platform, Yellow Sea		(China) Galactic Energy	
15 January; 20:10:00	(China) Tianqi 37-40	Guodian Gaoke	Low Earth	IoT	In orbit	Operational
16 January; 16:55:00	(China) Long March 3B/E	3B-Y?	(China) Xichang LC-3		(China) CASC	
16 January; 16:55:00	(China) Shijian 32	TBA	Geosynchronous	TBA	16 January	Launch failure
17 January; 04:05	(China) Ceres-2	Y1	(China) Jiuquan		(China) Galactic Energy	
17 January; 04:05	(China) LilacSat 3 (Zidingxiang 3)	TBA	Low Earth (SSO)	TBA	17 January	Launch failure
17 January; 04:05	(China) Jilin-1 Gaofen-07A	Chang Guang Satellite Technology	Low Earth (SSO)	Earth observation	17 January	Launch failure
17 January; 04:05	(China) Dongpo	TBA	Low Earth (SSO)	TBA	17 January	Launch failure
17 January; 04:05	(China) Jinjian Xing	TBA	Low Earth (SSO)	TBA	17 January	Launch failure
17 January; 04:05	(China) Xiguang-1 06 (Dafu-1)	TBA	Low Earth (SSO)	Earth observation	17 January	Launch failure
17 January; 04:05	(China) Yunyao-2 01	TBA	Low Earth (SSO)	TBA	17 January	Launch failure
17 January; 04:05	Maiden flight of Ceres-2.					
17 January; 04:18:00	(United States) Falcon 9 Block 5	F9-589	(United States) Vandenberg SLC-4E		(United States) SpaceX	
17 January; 04:18:00	(United States) USA-572 - USA-580 (Starshield Group 1-11)	NRO	Low Earth (SSO)	Reconnaissance	In orbit	Operational
17 January; 04:18:00	NROL-105 (NRO Proliferated Architecture Mission). Twelfth batch of SpaceX/Northrop built 9 Starshield satellites for the National Reconnaissance Office.					
18 January; 23:31:40	(United States) Falcon 9 Block 5	Starlink Group 6-100	(United States) Cape Canaveral SLC-40		(United States) SpaceX	
18 January; 23:31:40	(United States) Starlink × 29	SpaceX	Low Earth	Communications	In orbit	Operational
19 January; 07:48:00	(China) Long March 12	Y5	(China) Wenchang LC-2		(China) CASC	
19 January; 07:48:00	(China) Guowang × 9	CAST	Low Earth	Communications	In orbit	Operational
22 January; 05:47:29	(United States) Falcon 9 Block 5	Starlink Group 17-30	(United States) Vandenberg SLC-4E		(United States) SpaceX	
22 January; 05:47:29	(United States) Starlink × 25	SpaceX	Low Earth	Communications	In orbit	Operational
22 January; 10:52:00	(United States) Electron	"The Cosmos Will See You Now"	(New Zealand) Mahia LC-1		(United States) Rocket Lab	
22 January; 10:52:00	⚀ (Spain) MR-1	Open Cosmos	Low Earth (Polar)	Communications	In orbit	Operational
22 January; 10:52:00	⚀ (Spain) MR-2	Open Cosmos	Low Earth (Polar)	Communications	In orbit	Operational
25 January; 17:30:39	(United States) Falcon 9 Block 5	Starlink Group 17-20	(United States) Vandenberg SLC-4E		(United States) SpaceX	
25 January; 17:30:39	(United States) Starlink × 25	SpaceX	Low Earth	Communications	In orbit	Operational
28 January; 04:53:16	(United States) Falcon 9 Block 5	F9-593	(United States) Cape Canaveral SLC-40		(United States) SpaceX	
28 January; 04:53:16	(United States) USA-581 (GPS-III 09 Ellison Onizuka)	U.S. Space Force	Medium Earth	Navigation	In orbit	Operational
28 January; 04:53:16	Named after NASA astronaut Ellison Onizuka. It was originally scheduled to launch on a ULA's Vulcan rocket, was reassigned to Falcon 9. As a result, GPS IIIF-3, originally planned to launch on a Falcon Heavy will now launch on Vulcan.					
29 January; 15:17:00	(United States) Falcon 9 Block 5	Starlink Group 17-19	(United States) Vandenberg SLC-4E		(United States) SpaceX	
29 January; 15:17:00	(United States) Starlink × 25	SpaceX	Low Earth	Communications	In orbit	Operational
30 January; 00:55:39	(United States) Electron	"Bridging The Swarm"	(New Zealand) Mahia LC-1A		(United States) Rocket Lab	
30 January; 00:55:39	(South Korea) Neonsat-1A	KASA	Low Earth (SSO)	Technology demonstration	In orbit	Operational
30 January; 07:22:00	(United States) Falcon 9 Block 5	Starlink Group 6-101	(United States) Cape Canaveral SLC-40		(United States) SpaceX	
30 January; 07:22:00	(United States) Starlink × 29	SpaceX	Low Earth	Communications	In orbit	Operational
31 January; 04:01:00	(China) Long March 2C	2C-Y?	(China) Jiuquan SLS-2		(China) CASC	
31 January; 04:01:00	(Algeria) AlSat-3B	Algerian Space Agency	Low Earth (SSO)	Earth observation	In orbit	Operational

- ← Jan
- Feb
- Mar
- Apr
- May
- Jun
- Jul
- Aug
- Sep
- Oct
- Nov
- Dec →

=== February ===
Date and time (UTC)	Rocket	Flight number	Launch site		LSP	
Date and time (UTC)	Payload (⚀ = CubeSat)	Operator	Orbit	Function	Decay (UTC)	Outcome
Date and time (UTC)	Remarks					
2 February; 15:47:11	(United States) Falcon 9 Block 5	Starlink Group 17-32	(United States) Vandenberg SLC-4E		(United States) SpaceX	
2 February; 15:47:11	(United States) Starlink × 25	SpaceX	Low Earth	Communications	In orbit	Operational
2 February; 15:47:11	The upper stage engine on this launch failed to ignite for a planned re-entry burn after payload deployment.					
5 February; 18:59:00	(Russia) Soyuz-2.1b / Fregat-M		(Russia) Plesetsk Site 43/4		(Russia) RVSN RF	
5 February; 18:59:00	(Russia) Kosmos 2600 (EO MKA №7)	VKS	Low Earth (SSO)	TBA	In orbit	Operational
5 February; 18:59:00	(Russia) Kosmos 2601 (RU UNK A1)	VKS	Low Earth (SSO)	TBA	In orbit	Operational
5 February; 18:59:00	(Russia) Kosmos 2602 (RU UNK A2)	VKS	Low Earth (SSO)	TBA	In orbit	Operational
5 February; 18:59:00	(Russia) Kosmos 2603 (RU UNK A3)	VKS	Low Earth (SSO)	TBA	In orbit	Operational
5 February; 18:59:00	(Russia) Kosmos 2604 (RU UNK A4)	VKS	Low Earth (SSO)	TBA	In orbit	Operational
5 February; 18:59:00	(Russia) Kosmos 2605 (RU UNK A5)	VKS	Low Earth (SSO)	TBA	In orbit	Operational
5 February; 18:59:00	(Russia) Kosmos 2606 (RU UNK A6)	VKS	Low Earth (SSO)	TBA	In orbit	Operational
5 February; 18:59:00	(Russia) Kosmos 2607 (RU UNK A7)	VKS	Low Earth (SSO)	TBA	In orbit	Operational
5 February; 18:59:00	(Russia) Kosmos 2608 (RU UNK A8)	VKS	Low Earth (SSO)	TBA	In orbit	Operational
7 February; 03:55:00	(China) Long March 2F/T	2F-T6	(China) Jiuquan SLS-1		(China) CASC	
7 February; 03:55:00	(China) Reusable Experimental Spacecraft (CSSHQ 4)	CASC	Low Earth	Technology demonstration	In orbit	Operational
7 February; 03:55:00	Fourth flight of the reusable experimental spacecraft.					
7 February; 20:58:09	(United States) Falcon 9 Block 5	Starlink Group 17-33	(United States) Vandenberg SLC-4E		(United States) SpaceX	
7 February; 20:58:09	(United States) Starlink × 25	SpaceX	Low Earth	Communications	In orbit	Operational
11 February; 17:11:29	(United States) Falcon 9 Block 5	Starlink Group 17-34	(United States) Vandenberg SLC-4E		(United States) SpaceX	
11 February; 17:11:29	(United States) Starlink × 24	SpaceX	Low Earth	Communications	In orbit	Operational
12 February; 06:30:00	(China) Jielong 3	Y9	(China) Special Launch Platform, Yellow Sea		China Rocket	
12 February; 06:30:00	(Pakistan) PRSC-E02	SUPARCO	Low Earth	TBA	In orbit	Operational
12 February; 06:30:00	(China) Gangzhongda 1	TBA	Low Earth	TBA	In orbit	Operational
12 February; 06:30:00	(China) Dianli Hongwai A	TBA	Low Earth	TBA	In orbit	Operational
12 February; 06:30:00	(China) Shutainyuxing 03-05	TBA	Low Earth	TBA	In orbit	Operational
12 February; 06:30:00	(China) Kongjian Huanjing Jiance	TBA	Low Earth	TBA	In orbit	Operational
12 February; 08:52:15	(Russia) Proton-M / DM-03		(Kazakhstan) Baikonur Site 81/24		(Russia) Roscosmos	
12 February; 08:52:15	(Russia) Elektro-L №5	Roscosmos	Geosynchronous	Meteorology	In orbit	Operational
12 February; 08:52:15	(Iran) Jam-e Jam 1	IRIB	Geosynchronous	Communications	In orbit	Operational
12 February; 08:52:15	Last launch of Proton-M in Proton-M/DM-03 Configuration. Future launches using DM-03 upper stage will fly on Angara A5 as Persei/Orion Upper stage from Plesetsk and Vostochny and is the last time the upper stage will fly from Baikonur.					
12 February; 09:22:00	(United States) Vulcan Centaur VC4S	V-004	(United States) Cape Canaveral SLC-41		(United States) ULA	
12 February; 09:22:00	(United States) USA-582 (GSSAP-7/Hornet-7)	USSF	Geosynchronous	Space surveillance	In orbit	Operational
12 February; 09:22:00	(United States) USA-583 (GSSAP-8/Hornet-8)	USSF	Geosynchronous	Space surveillance	In orbit	Operational
12 February; 09:22:00	(United States) USA-584	USSF	Geosynchronous	TBA	In orbit	Operational
12 February; 09:22:00	(United States) USA-643	USSF	Geosynchronous	TBA	In orbit	Operational
12 February; 09:22:00	USSF-87 Mission. Approximately 1 minute and 7 seconds into the launch, the nozzle on one of solid rocket boosters (SRB) fell off resulting in a shower of debris in the exhaust plume. Although the SRB continued to function for its full 90-second burn, the anomaly led to reduced, asymmetrical thrust. This caused the rocket to roll before the guidance system and main engines successfully corrected and extended their burn to compensate. Despite the anomaly, the rocket achieved a perfect orbital insertion.					
12 February; 16:45:00	(France) Ariane 64	VA267/LE-01	(France) Kourou ELA-4		(France) Arianespace	
12 February; 16:45:00	(United States) KuiperSat × 32	Amazon Leo	Low Earth	Communications	In orbit	Operational
12 February; 16:45:00	Maiden flight of Ariane 6 in A64 Configuration and First of 18 Ariane 6 launches for Amazon Leo.					
13 February; 10:15:00	(United States) Falcon 9 Block 5	F9-599	(United States) Cape Canaveral SLC-40		(United States) SpaceX	
13 February; 10:15:00	(United States) SpaceX Crew-12	NASA	Low Earth (ISS)	Expedition 74 / 75	In orbit	Docked to ISS
13 February; 10:15:00	Twelfth operational Crew Dragon mission to the ISS. First landing on LZ-40, a new booster landing zone located at SLC-40.					
15 February; 01:59:59	(United States) Falcon 9 Block 5	Starlink Group 17-13	(United States) Vandenberg SLC-4E		(United States) SpaceX	
15 February; 01:59:59	(United States) Starlink × 24	SpaceX	Low Earth	Communications	In orbit	Operational
16 February; 07:59:40	(United States) Falcon 9 Block 5	Starlink Group 6-103	(United States) Cape Canaveral SLC-40		(United States) SpaceX	
16 February; 07:59:40	(United States) Starlink × 29	SpaceX	Low Earth	Communications	In orbit	Operational
20 February; 01:41:40	(United States) Falcon 9 Block 5	Starlink Group 10-36	(United States) Cape Canaveral SLC-40		(United States) SpaceX	
20 February; 01:41:40	(United States) Starlink × 29	SpaceX	Low Earth	Communications	In orbit	Operational
20 February; 01:41:40	Booster has landed within The Bahamas, first operational launch to do so after the trajectory was tested during launch of Starlink Group 10-12 in February 2025.					
21 February; 09:04:19	(United States) Falcon 9 Block 5	Starlink Group 17-25	(United States) Vandenberg SLC-4E		(United States) SpaceX	
21 February; 09:04:19	(United States) Starlink × 25	SpaceX	Low Earth	Communications	In orbit	Operational
22 February; 03:47:19	(United States) Falcon 9 Block 5	Starlink Group 6-104	(United States) Cape Canaveral SLC-40		(United States) SpaceX	
22 February; 03:47:19	(United States) Starlink × 28	SpaceX	Low Earth	Communications	In orbit	Operational
24 February; 23:04:10	(United States) Falcon 9 Block 5	Starlink Group 6-110	(United States) Cape Canaveral SLC-40		(United States) SpaceX	
24 February; 23:04:10	(United States) Starlink × 29	SpaceX	Low Earth	Communications	In orbit	Operational
25 February; 14:17:49	(United States) Falcon 9 Block 5	Starlink Group 17-26	(United States) Vandenberg SLC-4E		(United States) SpaceX	
25 February; 14:17:49	(United States) Starlink × 25	SpaceX	Low Earth	Communications	In orbit	Operational
27 February; 12:16:10	(United States) Falcon 9 Block 5	Starlink Group 6-108	(United States) Cape Canaveral SLC-40		(United States) SpaceX	
27 February; 12:16:10	(United States) Starlink × 29	SpaceX	Low Earth	Communications	In orbit	Operational

- ← Jan
- Feb
- Mar
- Apr
- May
- Jun
- Jul
- Aug
- Sep
- Oct
- Nov
- Dec →

=== March ===
Date and time (UTC)	Rocket	Flight number	Launch site		LSP	
Date and time (UTC)	Payload (⚀ = CubeSat)	Operator	Orbit	Function	Decay (UTC)	Outcome
Date and time (UTC)	Remarks					
1 March; 10:10:39	(United States) Falcon 9 Block 5	Starlink Group 17-23	(United States) Vandenberg SLC-4E		(United States) SpaceX	
1 March; 10:10:39	(United States) Starlink × 25	SpaceX	Low Earth	Communications	In orbit	Operational
2 March; 02:56:40	(United States) Falcon 9 Block 5	Starlink Group 10-41	(United States) Cape Canaveral SLC-40		(United States) SpaceX	
2 March; 02:56:40	(United States) Starlink × 29	SpaceX	Low Earth	Communications	In orbit	Operational
4 March; 10:52:20	(United States) Falcon 9 Block 5	Starlink Group 10-40	(United States) Cape Canaveral SLC-40		(United States) SpaceX	
4 March; 10:52:20	(United States) Starlink × 29	SpaceX	Low Earth	Communications	In orbit	Operational
5 March; 02:10:00	(Japan) KAIROS	F3	(Japan) Spaceport Kii		(Japan) Space One	
5 March; 02:10:00	(Japan) TATARA-1R	Terra Space	Low Earth (SSO)	Technology demonstration	5 March	Launch failure
5 March; 02:10:00	⚀ (Japan) SC-Sat1a	Space Cubics	Low Earth (SSO)	Technology demonstration	5 March	Launch failure
5 March; 02:10:00	⚀ (Japan) HErO	Hiroo Gakuen	Low Earth (SSO)	Technology demonstration / Educational	5 March	Launch failure
5 March; 02:10:00	⚀ (Japan) AETS-1	ArkEdge Space	Low Earth (SSO)	TBA	5 March	Launch failure
5 March; 02:10:00	⚀ (Taiwan) NutSat-3	TASA	Low Earth (SSO)	Amateur radio	5 March	Launch failure
5 March; 23:53	(United States) Electron	"Insight At Speed Is A Friend Indeed"	(New Zealand) Mahia LC-1		(United States) Rocket Lab	
5 March; 23:53	(United States) BlackSky Global 34	BlackSky Global	Low Earth	Technology demonstration	In orbit	Operational
8 March; 11:00:19	(United States) Falcon 9 Block 5	Starlink Group 17-18	(United States) Vandenberg SLC-4E		(United States) SpaceX	
8 March; 11:00:19	(United States) Starlink × 25	SpaceX	Low Earth	Communications	In orbit	Operational
10 March; 04:19:00	(United States) Falcon 9 Block 5	F9-612	(United States) Cape Canaveral SLC-40		(United States) SpaceX	
10 March; 04:19:00	(United States) EchoStar XXV	EchoStar	Geosynchronous	Communications	In orbit	Operational
10 March; 04:19:00	With a mass of 6.8 tonnes, EchoStar XXV is the second heaviest satellite to be launched into GTO by Falcon 9.					
12 March; 00:50:00	(United States) Alpha Block 1	FLTA007	(United States) Vandenberg SLC-2W		(United States) Firefly Aerospace	
12 March; 00:50:00	(United States) ICOR SV	Lockheed Martin	Low Earth (Retrograde)	TBA	In orbit	Operational
12 March; 00:50:00	Final flight of Firefly Aerospace’s Alpha Block 1 rocket.					
12 March; 19:48:00	(China) Long March 8A	8A-Y8 / SatNet LEO Group 18	(China) Wenchang Commercial LC-1		(China) CASC	
12 March; 19:48:00	(China) Guowang × 9	CAST	Low Earth	Communications	In orbit	Operational
12 March; 22:33:00	(China) Long March 2D	2D-Y95	(China) Xichang LC-3		(China) CASC	
12 March; 22:33:00	(China) Shiyan 30C	TBA	Low Earth	Technology demonstration	In orbit	Operational
12 March; 22:33:00	(China) Shiyan 30D	TBA	Low Earth	Technology demonstration	In orbit	Operational
13 March; 14:57:59	(United States) Falcon 9 Block 5	Starlink Group 17-31	(United States) Vandenberg SLC-4E		(United States) SpaceX	
13 March; 14:57:59	(United States) Starlink × 25	SpaceX	Low Earth	Communications	In orbit	Operational
14 March; 12:30:00	(United States) Falcon 9 Block 5	Starlink Group 10-48	(United States) Cape Canaveral SLC-40		(United States) SpaceX	
14 March; 12:30:00	(United States) Starlink × 29	SpaceX	Low Earth	Communications	In orbit	Operational
15 March; 13:20:00	(China) Long March 6A	6A-Y28	(China) Taiyuan LA-9A		(China) CASC	
15 March; 13:20:00	(China) Yaogan 50-02	TBA	Low Earth (Retrograde)	TBA	In orbit	Operational
16 March; 04:12:00	(China) Kuaizhou 11	Y7	(China) Jiuquan LS-95A		(China) ExPace	
16 March; 04:12:00	(China) Juntian-1 04A	Beijing Juntian Aerospace Technology	Low Earth (SSO)	Earth observation	In orbit	Operational
16 March; 04:12:00	(China) Dongpo-11	Huantian Wisdom Technology	Low Earth (SSO)	Earth observation	In orbit	Operational
16 March; 04:12:00	(China) Dongpo-12	Huantian Wisdom Technology	Low Earth (SSO)	Earth observation	In orbit	Operational
16 March; 04:12:00	(China) Dongpo-16	Huantian Wisdom Technology	Low Earth (SSO)	Earth observation	In orbit	Operational
16 March; 04:12:00	(China) Weitong-1 01	Xingzhong Space Jiaxing Technology	Low Earth (SSO)	Technology demonstration	In orbit	Operational
16 March; 04:12:00	(China) Xiguang-1 06	Xi'an Zhongke Xiguang Aerospace Technology	Low Earth (SSO)	Earth observation	In orbit	Operational
16 March; 04:12:00	(China) Yuxing-3 05	Zhejiang Xingmu Tanyu Technology	Low Earth (SSO)	Technology demonstration	In orbit	Operational
16 March; 04:12:00	(China) Yuxing-3 06	Hunan University of Science and Technology	Low Earth (SSO)	Technology demonstration	In orbit	Operational
17 March; 05:19:09	(United States) Falcon 9 Block 5	Starlink Group 17-24	(United States) Vandenberg SLC-4E		(United States) SpaceX	
17 March; 05:19:09	(United States) Starlink × 25	SpaceX	Low Earth	Communications	In orbit	Operational
17 March; 13:27:34	(United States) Falcon 9 Block 5	Starlink Group 10-46	(United States) Cape Canaveral SLC-40		(United States) SpaceX	
17 March; 13:27:34	(United States) Starlink × 29	SpaceX	Low Earth	Communications	In orbit	Operational
19 March; 14:20:10	(United States) Falcon 9 Block 5	Starlink Group 10-33	(United States) Cape Canaveral SLC-40		(United States) SpaceX	
19 March; 14:20:10	(United States) Starlink × 29	SpaceX	Low Earth	Communications	In orbit	Operational
20 March; 18:10:00	(United States) Electron	Eight Days A Week	(New Zealand) Mahia LC-1		(United States) Rocket Lab	
20 March; 18:10:00	(Japan) StriX-6	Synspective	Low Earth	Earth observation	In orbit	Operational
20 March; 18:10:00	Eighth of 16 dedicated launches for Synspective's StriX constellation.					
20 March; 21:48:00	(United States) Falcon 9 Block 5	Starlink Group 17-15	(United States) Vandenberg SLC-4E		(United States) SpaceX	
20 March; 21:48:00	(United States) Starlink × 25	SpaceX	Low Earth	Communications	In orbit	Operational
22 March; 11:59:51	(Russia) Soyuz-2.1a		(Kazakhstan) Baikonur Site 31/6		(Russia) Roscosmos	
22 March; 11:59:51	(Russia) Progress MS-33 / 94P	Roscosmos	Low Earth (ISS)	ISS logistics	In orbit	Operational
22 March; 11:59:51	First launch from Baikonur Site 31/6 following the collapse of the pad's mobile maintenance platform on 27 November 2025.					
22 March; 14:43:00	(United States) Falcon 9 Block 5	Starlink Group 10-62	(United States) Cape Canaveral SLC-40		(United States) SpaceX	
22 March; 14:43:00	(United States) Starlink × 29	SpaceX	Low Earth	Communications	In orbit	Operational
22 March; 15:49:00	(China) Jielong 3	Y10	(China) Dong Fang Hang Tian Gang platform, Yellow Sea		China Rocket	
22 March; 15:49:00	(China) CentiSpace-1 (Weili Kongjian) × 10	Beijing Future Navigation Technology	Low Earth	Navigation	In orbit	Operational
23 March; 17:24:00	(Russia) Soyuz-2.1b / Fregat-M		(Russia) Plesetsk Site 43		(Russia) Roscosmos	
23 March; 17:24:00	(Russia) Rassvet × 16	Bureau 1440	Low Earth (Polar)	Communications	In orbit	Operational
23 March; 17:24:00	(Russia) MKA-OBZP 1	TBA	Low Earth (Polar)	TBA	In orbit	Operational
23 March; 17:24:00	First dedicated Soyuz-2 launches for Bureau 1440's Rassvet communication satellite constellation.					
25 March; 22:51:00	(China) Long March 2D	2D-Y105	(China) Taiyuan LC-9		(China) CASC	
25 March; 22:51:00	(China) SuperView Neo-2 05	SAST	Low Earth	Earth observation	In orbit	Operational
25 March; 22:51:00	(China) SuperView Neo-2 06	SAST	Low Earth	Earth observation	In orbit	Operational
26 March; 23:03:20	(United States) Falcon 9 Block 5	Starlink Group 17-17	(United States) Vandenberg SLC-4E		(United States) SpaceX	
26 March; 23:03:20	(United States) Starlink × 25	SpaceX	Low Earth	Communications	In orbit	Operational
27 March; 04:11:00	(China) Long March 2C / YZ-1S	2C-Y	(China) Jiuquan SLS-2		(China) CASC	
27 March; 04:11:00	(China) Shiyan-33	TBA	Low Earth	Space Science	In orbit	Operational
28 March; 09:14:00	(United States) Electron	Daughter Of The Stars	(New Zealand) Mahia LC-1		(United States) Rocket Lab	
28 March; 09:14:00	⚀ (European Union) Celeste IOD-1 (Pathfinder A1)	ESA	Low Earth	Technology demonstration	In orbit	Operational
28 March; 09:14:00	⚀ (European Union) Celeste IOD-2 (Pathfinder A2)	ESA	Low Earth	Technology demonstration	In orbit	Operational
28 March; 09:14:00	First Electron launch for European Space Agency (ESA) to deploy the first pair of satellites for a future navigation constellation, Celeste (LEO-PNT) (Low Earth Orbit Positioning, Navigation, and Timing). Rocket Lab will launch two "Pathfinder A" spacecraft, provided by European satellite prime contractors Thales Alenia Space and GMV, to a 510km low Earth orbit.					
30 March; 11:00:00	(China) Kinetica 2	Y1	(China) Jiuquan LS-140		(China) CAS Space	
30 March; 11:00:00	(China) New March 01	CAS	Low Earth	Technology demonstration	In orbit	Operational
30 March; 11:00:00	(China) New March 02 (Qingzhou Prototype Demo)	CAS	Low Earth	Technology demonstration	In orbit	Operational
30 March; 11:00:00	(China) TS 01	TBA	Low Earth	TBA	In orbit	Operational
30 March; 11:00:00	Maiden launch of Kinetica 2. First launch of the Qingzhou spacecraft.					
30 March; 11:02:00	(United States) Falcon 9 Block 5	Transporter-16	(United States) Vandenberg SLC-4E		(United States) SpaceX	
30 March; 11:02:00	(United States) Acadia-10	Capella Space	Low Earth (SSO)	Earth observation	In orbit	Operational
30 March; 11:02:00	(Turkey) FGN-100-d3	Fergani Space	Low Earth (SSO)	Technology demonstration	In orbit	Operational
30 March; 11:02:00	(United States) Gravitas	K2 Space	Low Earth (SSO)	Payload hosting	In orbit	Operational
30 March; 11:02:00	(United States) Hawk 14A-C	HawkEye 360	Low Earth (SSO)	SIGINT	In orbit	Operational
30 March; 11:02:00	(United Kingdom) HotSat-2	SatVu	Low Earth (SSO)	Earth observation	In orbit	Operational
30 March; 11:02:00	(Finland) ICEYE X × 6	ICEYE	Low Earth (SSO)	Earth observation	In orbit	Operational
30 March; 11:02:00	(Italy) ION SCV Astounding Alexandra	D-Orbit	Low Earth (SSO)	Space Tug	In orbit	Operational
30 March; 11:02:00	(Italy) IRIDE-MS1-EAGLET2 × 8	ASI	Low Earth (SSO)	Earth observation	In orbit	Operational
30 March; 11:02:00	(Norway) Mimir 1	Space Norway	Low Earth (SSO)	Payload Hosting	In orbit	Operational
30 March; 11:02:00	(Argentina) NuSat 53,54	Satellogic	Low Earth (SSO)	Earth observation	In orbit	Operational
30 March; 11:02:00	(France) Spacevan-002	Exotrail	Low Earth (SSO)	Space Tug	In orbit	Operational
30 March; 11:02:00	(United States) Vigoride-7	Momentus Space	Low Earth (SSO)	Space Tug	In orbit	Operational
30 March; 11:02:00	(United States) Vindlér 2.0 × 3	Sierra Nevada Corporation	Low Earth (SSO)	Earth observation	In orbit	Operational
30 March; 11:02:00	(United States) Winnebago-6	Varda Space Industries	Low Earth (SSO)	Reentry capsule	In orbit	Operational
30 March; 11:02:00	⚀ (Japan) AE1a	ArkEdge Space	Low Earth (SSO)	Communications	In orbit	Operational
30 March; 11:02:00	⚀ (Switzerland) AiglonSat-1	Aiglon College	Low Earth (SSO)	Educational	In orbit	Operational
30 March; 11:02:00	⚀ (Norway) AISSat-4	Norwegian Space Agency / Statsat AS	Low Earth (SSO)	AIS ship tracking	In orbit	Operational
30 March; 11:02:00	⚀ (France) BRO 19	Unseenlabs	Low Earth (SSO)	Radio frequency spectrum monitoring	In orbit	Operational
30 March; 11:02:00	⚀ (Taiwan) Black Kite-2	Rapidtek Technologies / Taiwan Space Agency	Low Earth (SSO)	Communications	In orbit	Operational
30 March; 11:02:00	⚀ (United States) COSMO	University of Colorado Boulder	Low Earth (SSO)	Earth's magnetic field measurement	In orbit	Operational
30 March; 11:02:00	⚀ (Denmark) DISCO-2	Danish Student CubeSat Program	Low Earth (SSO)	Climate change research	In orbit	Operational
30 March; 11:02:00	⚀ (Romania) EMISAR	Institute of Space Science - INFLPR Subsidiary	Low Earth (SSO)	Technology demonstration	In orbit	Operational
30 March; 11:02:00	⚀ (Greece) ERMIS-1,2,3	NKUA	Low Earth (SSO)	Technology demonstration	In orbit	Operational
30 March; 11:02:00	⚀ (Spain) FEMTO-1 (ARQSAT-1)	ARQUIMEA Research Center	Low Earth (SSO)	Technology demonstration	In orbit	Operational
30 March; 11:02:00	⚀ (France) Flylab-1,2	ONERA	Low Earth (SSO)	Technology demonstration	In orbit	Operational
30 March; 11:02:00	⚀ (Spain) FOSSASat 2E25	FOSSA Systems	Low Earth (SSO)	IoT	In orbit	Operational
30 March; 11:02:00	⚀ (Spain) GARAI B - Innosat Unamuno	SATLANTIS	Low Earth (SSO)	Earth observation	In orbit	Operational
30 March; 11:02:00	⚀ (United States) GEMS2-Amethyst	Weather Stream	Low Earth (SSO)	Meteorology	In orbit	Operational
30 March; 11:02:00	⚀ (United States) GENIE N1-ATLAS	NOVI Space, Inc.	Low Earth (SSO)	Technology demonstration	In orbit	Operational
30 March; 11:02:00	⚀ Ghost Rider	TBA	Low Earth (SSO)	TBA	In orbit	Operational
30 March; 11:02:00	⚀ Harbinger	TBA	Low Earth (SSO)	TBA	In orbit	Operational
30 March; 11:02:00	⚀ (United Kingdom) Io-1	Iota Technology	Low Earth (SSO)	Earth's magnetic field measurement	In orbit	Operational
30 March; 11:02:00	⚀ (South Korea) JACK-002	TBA	Low Earth (SSO)	TBA	In orbit	Operational
30 March; 11:02:00	⚀ (United States) Lemur-2 × 9	Spire Global	Low Earth (SSO)	Earth observation	In orbit	Operational
30 March; 11:02:00	⚀ (Taiwan) Lilium-4	NYCU	Low Earth (SSO)	Educational / Amateur radio	In orbit	Operational
30 March; 11:02:00	⚀ LUNA-2	TBA	Low Earth (SSO)	TBA	In orbit	Operational
30 March; 11:02:00	⚀ (Greece) OptiSat	Planetek Hellas	Low Earth (SSO)	Technology demonstration	In orbit	Operational
30 March; 11:02:00	⚀ (France) Out Of The Box	SpaceLocker	Low Earth (SSO)	Payload hosting	In orbit	Operational
30 March; 11:02:00	⚀ (Taiwan) PARUS-6U1	Taipei Tech	Low Earth (SSO)	Educational	In orbit	Operational
30 March; 11:02:00	⚀ (Greece) PeakSat	AUTh	Low Earth (SSO)	TBA	In orbit	Operational
30 March; 11:02:00	⚀ (United States) Phobos	Aethero	Low Earth (SSO)	Technology demonstration	In orbit	Operational
30 March; 11:02:00	⚀ (United Arab Emirates) Sharjah-Sat-2	Sharjah Academy of Astronomy, Space Sciences & Technology	Low Earth (SSO)	Earth observation	In orbit	Operational
30 March; 11:02:00	⚀ (United States) SAL-E	Cal Poly CubeSat Laboratory	Low Earth (SSO)	Educational	In orbit	Operational
30 March; 11:02:00	⚀ SERT3	TBA	Low Earth (SSO)	TBA	In orbit	Operational
30 March; 11:02:00	⚀ SM-1.2	TBA	Low Earth (SSO)	TBA	In orbit	Operational
30 March; 11:02:00	⚀ (United Kingdom) SPOQC	Quantum Communications Hub	Low Earth (SSO)	Quantum key distribution	In orbit	Operational
30 March; 11:02:00	⚀ (Taiwan) T.MicroSat-2	Tron Future Tech	Low Earth (SSO)	Technology demonstration	In orbit	Operational
30 March; 11:02:00	⚀ (United States) TES-23 (TechEdSat 23)	Ames Research Center	Low Earth (SSO)	Technology demonstration	In orbit	Operational
30 March; 11:02:00	⚀ (United States) ThinSat × 6 (Dream Big Constellation)	Purdue University Fort Wayne / Taylor University / University of Notre Dame / University of Toledo / Valparaiso University / Western Michigan University	Low Earth (SSO)	Educational	In orbit	Operational
30 March; 11:02:00	⚀ (Taiwan) TORO 3	Pyras Technology	Low Earth (SSO)	Oceanography	In orbit	Operational
30 March; 11:02:00	⚀ (United States) TROOP-F3	NearSpace Launch	Low Earth (SSO)	Payload hosting	In orbit	Operational
30 March; 11:02:00	⚀ (United Kingdom) (Sweden) VIREON 1, 2	AAC Clyde Space	Low Earth (SSO)	Earth observation	In orbit	Operational
30 March; 11:02:00	▫ (Singapore) (Malaysia) Decimal-Sat1	OCULLOSPACE	Low Earth (SSO)	DNA digital data storage	In orbit	Operational
30 March; 11:02:00	▫ (Spain) HADES-SA (SpinnyONE)	AMSAT EA	Low Earth (SSO)	Technology demonstration	In orbit	Operational
30 March; 11:02:00	▫ (United States) Helloworld-1	Upkoi, Inc.	Low Earth (SSO)	Technology demonstration	In orbit	Operational
30 March; 11:02:00	▫ (United Kingdom) Unicorn 2S, R	Alba Orbital	Low Earth (SSO)	Earth observation	In orbit	Operational
30 March; 11:02:00	▫ (Vietnam) VegaFly-1	Vega Space and Geospace Institute	Low Earth (SSO)	Educational / Amateur radio	In orbit	Operational
30 March; 11:02:00	Dedicated SmallSat Rideshare mission to sun-synchronous orbit, designated Transporter-16.					
30 March; 21:15:00	(United States) Falcon 9 Block 5	Starlink Group 10-44	(United States) Cape Canaveral SLC-40		(United States) SpaceX	
30 March; 21:15:00	(United States) Starlink × 29	SpaceX	Low Earth	Communications	In orbit	Operational
30 March; 21:15:00	B1067 will become the first booster to launch 34 missions.					
For flights after 31 March, see List of spaceflight launches in April–June 2026

- ← Jan
- Feb
- Mar
- Apr
- May
- Jun
- Jul
- Aug
- Sep
- Oct
- Nov
- Dec →

== Suborbital flights ==
Date and time (UTC)	Rocket	Flight number	Launch site		LSP	
Date and time (UTC)	Payload (⚀ = CubeSat)	Operator	Orbit	Function	Decay (UTC)	Outcome
Date and time (UTC)	Remarks					
8 January; 21:30	(Russia) Oreshnik		(Russia) Kapustin Yar		(Russia)	
8 January; 21:30	(Russia) Warhead(s)		Suborbital	Missile	8 January	Successful
8 January	(United States) ICBM Target Vehicle		Unknown		(United States) Northrop Grumman	
8 January	(United States)		Suborbital	Test Flight	8 January	Successful
12 January; 08:00	(China) Lihong-1		(China) Jiuquan		(China) CAS Space	
12 January; 08:00	(China) Lihong-1 Capsule		Suborbital	Research	12 January	Successful
12 January; 08:00	Apogee 120 km (75 mi).					
22 January; 14:30	(United States) New Shepard	NS-38	(United States) Corn Ranch		(United States) Blue Origin	
22 January; 14:30	(United States) Blue Origin NS-38	Blue Origin	Suborbital	Space Tourism	22 January	Successful
22 January; 14:30	Last flight of the New Shepard before Blue Origin suspended all New Shepard flights to focus on lunar exploration and moved all employees on the New Shepard program to the lunar exploration department at Blue Origin. The suspension will last no less than two years. Apogee 107 km (66 mi).					
30 January; 13:20	(Canada) Black Brant IX		(United States) Poker Flat Research Range		(United States) NASA	
30 January; 13:20	(United States) PolarNOx 3	Virginia Tech	Suborbital	Geospace science	30 January	Successful
3 February; 10:14:45	(Germany) (United Kingdom) SCOOTER HS-1		(Norway) Andøya		(Germany) (United Kingdom) Hypersonica	
3 February; 10:14:45	(Germany) (United Kingdom) SCOOTER	Hypersonica	Suborbital	Hypersonic Test	3 February	Successful
3 February; 10:14:45	First flight of SCOOTER HS-1, a single-stage launch vehicle. It accelerated to speeds exceeding Mach 6, with a range of over 300 km (190 mi).					
9 February; 12:30	(Canada) Black Brant IX		(United States) Poker Flat Research Range		(United States) NASA	
9 February; 12:30	(United States) AURORA (BaDASS)	Goddard Space Flight Center	Suborbital	Auroral science	9 February	Successful
9 February; 12:30	Black and Diffuse Aurora Science Surveyor (BaDASS).					
10 February; 10:30	(Canada) Black Brant IX		(United States) Poker Flat Research Range		(United States) NASA	
10 February; 10:30	(United States) GNEISS	Dartmouth College	Suborbital	Auroral science	10 February	Successful
10 February; 10:30	First of two launches.					
10 February; 10:30	(Canada) Black Brant IX		(United States) Poker Flat Research Range		(United States) NASA	
10 February; 10:30	(United States) GNEISS	Dartmouth College	Suborbital	Auroral science	10 February	Successful
10 February; 10:30	Second of two launches. Launched ~30s after the first launch.					
11 February; 03:00	(China) Long March 10A		(China) Wenchang Space Launch Site LC-3		(China) CASC	
11 February; 03:00	(China) Mengzhou	CASC	Suborbital	Test flight	11 February	Successful
11 February; 03:00	In-flight Abort Test completed successfully: the Mengzhou spacecraft separated, escaped from the launch vehicle and got retrieved. First stage reached an apogee of 105 kilometres (65 mi), performed a controlled reentry and splashdown.					
27 February; 21:00	(United States) HASTE	That’s Not A Knife	(United States) MARS LC-2		(United States) Rocket Lab	
27 February; 21:00	(Australia) (United States) Cassowary Vex	Hypersonix / DIU	Suborbital	Hypersonic Test	27 February	Successful
4 March; 07:01	(United States) Minuteman III	GT-255GM	(United States) Vandenberg LF-10?		(United States) AFGSC	
4 March; 07:01	(United States)	AFGSC	Suborbital	Test flight	4 March	Successful
4 March; 07:01	Re-entered ~4,200 mi (6,800 km) downrange near Kwajalein Atoll.					
10 March; 06:02	(United States) Improved Orion		(Sweden) Esrange		(Germany) MORABA / (Sweden) SNSA	
10 March; 06:02	(Germany) (Sweden) REXUS-35	DLR / SNSA	Suborbital	Education	10 March	Successful
10 March; 06:02	Apogee 75.5 km (46.9 mi).					
11 March; 00:25	(Norway) ICI-5b		(Norway) Andøya		(Norway) Andøya Space / (United States) NASA	
11 March; 00:25	(Norway) (Germany) (United States)	University of Oslo / Leibniz Institute of Atmospheric Physics / University of Iowa	Suborbital	Plasma turbulence	11 March	Successful
11 March; 00:25	Investigation of CUSP Irregularities-5b. Apogee 304 km (189 mi).					
12 March; 11:35	(United States) Improved Orion		(Sweden) Esrange		(Germany) MORABA / (Sweden) SNSA	
12 March; 11:35	(Germany) (Sweden) REXUS-36	DLR / SNSA	Suborbital	Education	12 March	Successful
18 March; 00:00 - 04:00	(United States) Terrier-Oriole?	JFTX-01 E1	(United States) Wallops Flight Facility		(United States) NASA	
18 March; 00:00 - 04:00	(United States)	MDA	Suborbital	Technology demonstration	18 March	Successful
20 March; 00:00 - 04:00	(United States) Terrier-Oriole?	JFTX-01 E2	(United States) Wallops Flight Facility		(United States) NASA	
20 March; 00:00 - 04:00	(United States)	MDA	Suborbital	Technology demonstration	20 March	Successful
26 March; 16:30	(United States) Long-Range Hypersonic Weapon		(United States) Cape Canaveral SLC-46		United States Army / United States Navy	
26 March; 16:30	(United States) Common-Hypersonic Glide Body (C-HGB)	United States Army / United States Navy	Suborbital	Missile test	26 March	Successful
26 March; 16:30	Third live-fire event for the Long-Range Hypersonic Weapon also known as Dark Eagle					
