= List of spaceflight launches in October–December 2026 =

This article lists orbital and suborbital launches during the fourth quarter of the year 2026.

For all other spaceflight activities, see 2026 in spaceflight. For launches during the rest of 2026, see List of spaceflight launches in January–March 2026, List of spaceflight launches in April–June 2026, and List of spaceflight launches in July–September 2026.

== Orbital launches ==
- ← Jan
- Feb
- Mar
- Apr
- May
- Jun
- Jul
- Aug
- Sep
- Oct
- Nov
- Dec →

=== October ===
Date and time (UTC)	Rocket	Flight number	Launch site		LSP	
Date and time (UTC)	Payload (⚀ = CubeSat)	Operator	Orbit	Function	Decay (UTC)	Outcome
Date and time (UTC)	Remarks					
1 October; 15:10	(United States) Falcon 9 Block 5		(United States) Cape Canaveral SLC-40		(United States) SpaceX	
1 October; 15:10	(United States) SpaceX Crew-13	NASA	Low Earth (ISS)	Expedition 75 / 76	In orbit	Docked to ISS
1 October; 15:10	Thirteenth operational Crew Dragon mission to the ISS.					
1 October; 18:18	(United States) Falcon 9 Block 5	Transporter-18	(United States) Vandenberg SLC-4E		(United States) SpaceX	
1 October; 18:18	(United States) SPRITE	NASA/LASP	Low Earth (SSO)	Space observatory	In orbit	Operational
1 October; 18:18	(Ukraine) UASAT-NANO	STETMAN/GomSpace	Low Earth (SSO)	Communications satellite	In orbit	Operational
1 October; 18:18	(Canada) GHGSat C18 and C19	GHGSat	Low Earth (SSO)	Earth observation satellite	In orbit	Operational
1 October; 18:18	(United States) Flock 4J-17 and 4J-18	Planet Labs	Low Earth (SSO)	Earth observation satellite	In orbit	Operational
1 October; 18:18	(United States) Tanager-2	Planet Labs	Low Earth (SSO)	Earth observation satellite	In orbit	Operational
1 October; 18:18	(United States) Project Suncatcher prototype satellite	Planet Labs and Google	Low Earth (SSO)	Technology demonstration	In orbit	Operational
1 October; 18:18	(Denmark) GOMX-5	ESA/GomSpace	Low Earth (SSO)	Technology demonstration	In orbit	Operational
1 October; 18:18	(Singapore) Crimson-1	Nanyang Technological University	Low Earth (SSO)	Technology demonstration	In orbit	Operational
1 October; 18:18	(Malaysia) KENSAT	Cosmoworks	Low Earth (SSO)	Technology demonstration	In orbit	Operational
1 October; 18:18	(South Korea) JACK-006	CosmoWorks	Low Earth (SSO)	Earth observation satellite	In orbit	Operational
1 October; 18:18	(South Korea) GyeonggiSat-2A	Naraspace	Low Earth (SSO)	Earth observation	In orbit	Operational
1 October; 18:18	(United States) Green Propulsion Dual Mode (GPDM)	NASA	Low Earth (SSO)	Technology demonstration	In orbit	Operational
1 October; 18:18	(Italy) IRIDE-MS1-EAGLET2 17 to 24	ESA/ASI	Low Earth (SSO)	Earth observation	In orbit	Operational
1 October; 18:18	(Netherlands) eLEAF-01	eLEAF	Low Earth (SSO)	Earth observation	In orbit	Operational
1 October; 18:18	(United States) Blackwing Space Baby Bird	Blackwing Space	Low Earth (SSO)	Technology demonstration	In orbit	Operational
1 October; 18:18	(United States) NewSat-? (56,57,64)	Satellogic	Low Earth (SSO)	Earth observation satellite	In orbit	Operational
1 October; 18:18	(United States) Merlin-1	Satellogic	Low Earth (SSO)	Earth observation satellite	In orbit	Operational
1 October; 18:18	(Italy) HERMES	INAF and Italian Space Agency	Low Earth (SSO)	Technology demonstration	In orbit	Operational
1 October; 18:18	(Canada) Terra Nova	NordSpace	Low Earth (SSO)	Technology demonstration	In orbit	Operational
1 October; 18:18	(India) (France) HORUS Star Tracker / LEAP-2	Dhruva Space and Sodern	Low Earth (SSO)	Technology demonstration	In orbit	Operational
1 October; 18:18	(United States) Meridian FCL	Meridian Space (formerly part of SpinLaunch)	Low Earth (SSO)	Communications satellite	In orbit	Operational
1 October; 18:18	(Italy) ION SCV ×3	D-Orbit	Low Earth (SSO)	Communications satellite	In orbit	Operational
1 October; 18:18	(United States) GNOMES-10	PlanetiQ	Low Earth (SSO)	Earth observation satellite	In orbit	Operational
1 October; 18:18	(Finland) ICEYE-X83, 85, 86, 87	ICEYE	Low Earth (SSO)	Earth observation	In orbit	Operational
1 October; 18:18	(Germany) (Luxembourg) ATHENE-1	University of the Bundeswehr Munich and Luxspace	Low Earth (SSO)	Technology demonstration	In orbit	Operational
1 October; 18:18	(Spain) OSSIE	UARX Space	Low Earth (SSO)	Technology demonstration	In orbit	Operational
1 October; 18:18	(Italy) BOB	D-Orbit	Low Earth (SSO)	Technology demonstration	In orbit	Operational
1 October; 18:18	(Italy) KEVIN	D-Orbit	Low Earth (SSO)	Technology demonstration	In orbit	Operational
1 October; 18:18	(Italy) STUART	D-Orbit	Low Earth (SSO)	Technology demonstration	In orbit	Operational
1 October; 18:18	(United Kingdom) F2G1	BAE Systems	Low Earth (SSO)	Reconnaissance satellite	In orbit	Operational
1 October; 18:18	(United Arab Emirates) Altair-1	Orbitworks	Low Earth (SSO)	Earth observation satellite	In orbit	Operational
1 October; 18:18	(United States) Element-1	CesiumAstro	Low Earth (SSO)	Communications satellite	In orbit	Operational
1 October; 18:18	(United States) SSPICY Otter	Starfish Space	Low Earth (SSO)	Space Debris Inspection	In orbit	Operational
1 October; 18:18	(United States) Reason-1	Cowboy Space Corporation	Low Earth (SSO)	Technology demonstration	In orbit	Operational
1 October; 18:18	(United Kingdom) HotSat-3	Surrey Satellite Technology	Low Earth (SSO)	Earth observation satellite	In orbit	Operational
1 October; 18:18	(United States) W-8 and W-9	Varda Space Industries	Low Earth (SSO)	Space manufacturing	In orbit	Operational
1 October; 18:18	⚀ (Japan) AE4LA	ArkEdge Space	Low Earth (SSO)	Communications satellite	In orbit	Operational
1 October; 18:18	⚀ (France) BRO-23 & 32	Unseenlabs	Low Earth (SSO)	Signals intelligence	In orbit	Operational
1 October; 18:18	⚀ (Paraguay) GuaraniSat-2	Agencia Especial de Paraguay (AEP)	Low Earth (SSO)	Earth observation satellite	In orbit	Operational
1 October; 18:18	⚀ (United States) Lemur-2 ×3	Spire Global	Low Earth (SSO)	Earth observation satellite	In orbit	Operational
1 October; 18:18	⚀ (Spain) Sateliot_5 to 9	Sateliot	Low Earth (SSO)	Communications satellite	In orbit	Operational
1 October; 18:18	⚀ (United States) Tomorrow-S ×2	Tomorrow.io	Low Earth (SSO)	Meteorological satellite	In orbit	Operational
1 October; 18:18	⚀ (United States) Watchdog-v0 ×2	Spire Global	Low Earth (SSO)	Space domain awareness	In orbit	Operational
1 October; 18:18	(Poland) MikroGLOB-2 to 4	Ministry of National Defence	Low Earth (SSO)	Earth observation satellite	In orbit	Operational
1 October; 18:18	Dedicated SmallSat Rideshare mission to sun-synchronous orbit, designated Transporter-18. Includes 45 client payloads via Exolaunch.					
2 October; 03:53:00	(United States) Falcon Heavy		(United States) Kennedy LC-39A		(United States) SpaceX	
2 October; 03:53:00	(United States) USA-708	NRO	TBA	TBA	In orbit	Operational
2 October; 03:53:00	NROL-97 Mission. First NRO launch on a Falcon Heavy.					
7 October; 03:23:00	(South Korea) Nuri		(South Korea) Naro LC-2		(South Korea) KARI	
7 October; 03:23:00	(South Korea) NeonSat ×5	KAIST	Low Earth (SSO)	Earth Observation	In orbit	Operational
7 October; 03:23:00	(South Korea) SLEDGE	OnB Space	Low Earth (SSO)	Meteorology	In orbit	Operational
7 October; 03:23:00	(South Korea) GBSAT	KAIST	Low Earth (SSO)	Space Weather Observation	In orbit	Operational
7 October; 03:23:00	(South Korea) PERSAT-02	Quaternion	Low Earth (SSO)	Earth Observation	In orbit	Deployment failure
7 October; 03:23:00	(South Korea) UEL-Y-Sys	Unmanned Exploration Laboratory	Low Earth (SSO)	Earth Observation	In orbit	Operational
7 October; 03:23:00	(South Korea) SD-1 SAT	Space&Bean	Low Earth (SSO)	Technology demonstration	In orbit	Operational
7 October; 03:23:00	(South Korea) E3_TESTER-KARI-2	KARI	Low Earth (SSO)	Technology demonstration	In orbit	Operational
7 October; 03:23:00	(South Korea) DaejonSat-1	Daejeon City Council	Low Earth (SSO)	Earth Observation	In orbit	Operational
7 October; 03:23:00	(South Korea) BEE-1012	Space LiinTech	Low Earth (SSO)	Technology demonstration	In orbit	Operational
7 October; 03:23:00	(South Korea) JACK-007	CosmosWorks	Low Earth (SSO)	Earth Observation	In orbit	Operational
7 October; 03:23:00	(South Korea) CPSat	Chosun University and Pusan National University	Low Earth (SSO)	Technology demonstration	In orbit	Operational
9 October; 19:27:58	(China) Long March 12	Y10 / SatNet LEO Group 27	(China) Wenchang LC-2		(China) CASC	
9 October; 19:27:58	(China) Guowang × 9	CAST	Low Earth	Communications	In orbit	Operational
10 October; 07:39:00	(United States) Falcon 9 Block 5		(United States) Vandenberg SLC-4E		(United States) SpaceX	
10 October; 07:39:00	(United States) T1TL-A × 21	SDA	Low Earth (SSO)	Military Communications	In orbit	Operational
13 October; 00:28:11	(United States) Falcon 9 Block 5	Starlink Group 15-25	(United States) Vandenberg SLC-4E		(United States) SpaceX	
13 October; 00:28:11	(United States) Starlink × 27	SpaceX	Low Earth	Communications	In orbit	Operational
13 October; 10:33:44	(United States) Falcon 9 Block 5		(United States) Cape Canaveral SLC-40		(United States) SpaceX	
13 October; 10:33:44	(United States) SpaceX CRS-35	NASA	Low Earth (ISS)	ISS logistics	In orbit	Docked to ISS
14 October; 11:40:00	(China) Zhuque-2E	Y4	(China) Jiuquan Dongfeng Zone		(China) LandSpace	
14 October; 11:40:00	(China) 10 satelites		Low Earth (SSO)	Communications	In orbit	Operational
14 October; 11:40:00	Flight test mission					
16 October; 00:01:05	(United States) Falcon 9 Block 5		(United States) Vandenberg Space Force Base SLC-4E		(United States) SpaceX	
16 October; 00:01:05	(United States) USA-709 - USA-725 (Starshield Group 1-18)	United States Space Force	Low Earth (Polar)	Military Communications	In orbit	Operational
16 October; 00:01:05	USSF-481 (SBST TH-2) mission. Fifth of 18 planned missions for the USSF's Space Based Sensing and Targeting (SBST) portfolio. 17 Modified Starshields, suspected to be second batch of Airborne Moving Target Indicator Satellites.					
19 October; 19:41:03	(Japan) H3-24L	F10	(Japan) Tanegashima LA-Y2		(Japan) JAXA	
19 October; 19:41:03	(Japan) Martian Moons eXploration (MMX)	JAXA	Areocentric to Earth	Mars orbiter Phobos sample return	In orbit	En route
19 October; 19:41:03	(France) (Germany) Idefix	DLR / CNES	Areocentric	Phobos rover	In orbit	En route
19 October; 19:41:03	Sample return mission from Phobos.					
20 October; 11:04	(United States) Falcon 9 Block 5	Bandwagon 5	(United States) Cape Canaveral SLC-40		(United States) SpaceX	
20 October; 11:04	⚀ (Taiwan) T-MicroSat 3 and 4	Tron Future Tech	Low Earth	Communications satellite	In orbit	Operational
20 October; 11:04	(Singapore) SIRIUS-A and B	ST Satellite Engineering Systems	Low Earth	Communications satellite	In orbit	Operational
20 October; 11:04	⚀ (Spain) FossaSat-2E27	FOSSA Systems	Low Earth	Communications satellite	In orbit	Operational
20 October; 11:04	⚀ (United States) Tomorrow-S 14 and 15	Tomorrow.io	Low Earth	Weather satellite	In orbit	Operational
20 October; 11:04	(United States) LEO Express 4	Impulse Space	Low Earth	Technology demonstration	In orbit	Operational
20 October; 11:04	(United States) Hawk-15 x3	HawkEye 360	Low Earth	Reconnaissance satellite	In orbit	Operational
20 October; 11:04	(Finland) (Portugal) ICEYE X84, 88, 109, 110	ICEYE	Low Earth	Earth observation satellite	In orbit	Operational
20 October; 11:04	(United States) Pulsar-01,02,03,04	Xona Space Systems	Low Earth	Navigation satellite	In orbit	Operational
20 October; 11:04	(United States) PTS-1 and 2	Xona Space Systems	Low Earth	Navigation satellite	In orbit	Operational
20 October; 11:04	(United States) Acadia-11 and 12	Capella Space	Low Earth	Earth observation satellite	In orbit	Operational
20 October; 11:04	(Turkey) FRG-100D4	Fergani Space	Low Earth	Technology demonstration	In orbit	Operational
20 October; 11:04	(United States) Starburst-1	Portal Space Systems	Low Earth	Technology demonstration	In orbit	Operational
20 October; 11:04	(United States) Pelican-12	Planet Labs	Low Earth	Earth observation satellite	In orbit	Operational
20 October; 11:04	(United States) GNOMES-11	PlanetiQ	Low Earth	Earth observation satellite	In orbit	Operational
20 October; 11:04	⚀ (United States) Maxwell	University of Colorado Boulder, NASA, Viasat and Rocket Lab	Low Earth	Technology demonstration	In orbit	Operational
20 October; 11:04	(United States) W-Series 7	Varda Space Industries	Low Earth	Technology demonstration	In orbit	Operational
20 October; 11:04	(United States) Umbra-13 and 14	Umbra Lab	Low Earth	Earth observation satellite	In orbit	Operational
20 October; 11:04	(United States) Starfall Demo 2	SpaceX	Low Earth	Technology demonstration	20 October	Successful
20 October; 11:04	Fifth Bandwagon mission					
21 October; 03:39	(China) Ceres-1S		(China) Haiyang Oriental Spaceport Rizhao Offshore Launch Location		(China) Galactic Energy	
21 October; 03:39	(China) Xiguang-4 01	Guangzhou University	Low Earth	Earth observation satellite	In orbit	Operational
23 October; 07:11	(United States) Electron	We're Not Hawking Around	(New Zealand) Mahia LC-1A		(United States) Rocket Lab	
23 October; 07:11	(United States) HawkEye 360 Cluster 16	HawkEye 360	Low Earth	SIGINT (Signals Intelligence)	In orbit	Operational
23 Oct; 10:15	(China) Long March 6A	6A-Y?	(China) Taiyuan LC-9A		(China) CASC	
23 Oct; 10:15	(China) Yaogan 50-03	TBA	Low Earth (Retrograde)	Reconnaissance	In orbit	Operational
23 October; 19:25	(China) Long March 4B	4B-Y59	(China) Jiuquan Site 94		(China) CASC	
23 October; 19:25	(China) Yaogan 53-07 to 09	TBA	Low Earth	Reconnaissance	In orbit	Operational
23 October; 19:25	(China) Yaogan 56-19 to 21	TBA	Low Earth	Reconnaissance	In orbit	Operational
23 October; 22:48	(United States) Falcon 9 Block 5	Starlink Group 15-15	(United States) Vandenberg SLC-4E		(United States) SpaceX	
23 October; 22:48	(United States) Starlink × 27	SpaceX	Low Earth	Communications	In orbit	Operational
25 October; 02:03	(China) Long March 8A	Y12 / SatNet LEO Group 28	(China) Wenchang LC-1		(China) CASC	
25 October; 02:03	(China) Guowang × 9	SatNet	Low Earth	Communications satellite	In orbit	Operational
27 October; 07:25:51	(United States) Falcon 9 Block 5	Starlink Group 15-16	(United States) Vandenberg SLC-4E		(United States) SpaceX	
27 October; 07:25:51	(United States) Starlink × 27	SpaceX	Low Earth	Communications	In orbit	Operational
27 October; 07:25:51	700th Falcon 9 Launch.					
30 October; 18:21	(India) GSLV Mk II	GSLV F18	(India) Satish Dhawan SLP		(India) ISRO	
30 October; 18:21	(India) NVS-03	ISRO	Geosynchronous	Navigation	In orbit	Operational
30 October; 18:21	Third launch of the next gen NaVIC satellites					
31 October; 04:04:34	(United States) Falcon 9 Block 5	Starlink Group 15-18	(United States) Vandenberg SLC-4E		(United States) SpaceX	
31 October; 04:04:34	(United States) Starlink × 27	SpaceX	Low Earth	Communications	In orbit	Operational

- ← Jan
- Feb
- Mar
- Apr
- May
- Jun
- Jul
- Aug
- Sep
- Oct
- Nov
- Dec →

=== November ===
Date and time (UTC)	Rocket	Flight number	Launch site		LSP	
Date and time (UTC)	Payload (⚀ = CubeSat)	Operator	Orbit	Function	Decay (UTC)	Outcome
Date and time (UTC)	Remarks					
2 November; 16:41	(United States) Electron	The Sea God Surveys	(New Zealand) Mahia LC-1		(United States) Rocket Lab	
2 November; 16:41	(Japan) QPS-SAR-20	iQPS	Low Earth	Earth observation satellite	In orbit	Operational
3 November; 00:15	(China) Kinetica 2		(China) Jiuquan Site 140		(China) CAS Space	
3 November; 00:15	(China) SpaceSail Polar Group #17	SpaceSail	Low Earth (Polar)	Communications satellite	In orbit	Operational
5 November; 15:58	(China) Long March 2C		(China) Xichang LC-3		(China) CASC	
5 November; 15:58	(China) Yaogan 51-07 to 09	Chinese Armed Forces	Low Earth	Remote Sensing	In orbit	Operational
6 November; 23:37	(China) Ceres-2		(China) Jiuquan Site 95A		(China) Galactic Energy	
6 November; 23:37	(China) Guanlan	QNLM	Low Earth (SSO)	Earth observation satellite	In orbit	Operational
6 November; 23:37	(China) Yunyao-1 28	TBA	Low Earth (SSO)	Earth observation satellite	In orbit	Operational
6 November; 23:37	North University of China No. 1	North University of China	Low Earth (SSO)	Technology demonstration	In orbit	Operational
6 November; 23:37	(China) Juntian-1 06A	TBA	Low Earth (SSO)	Technology demonstration	In orbit	Operational
6 November; 23:37	First successful Ceres-2 flight.					
7 November; 00:48:42	(United States) Falcon 9 Block 5		(United States) Vandenberg SLC-4E		(United States) SpaceX	
7 November; 00:48:42	(United States) USA-726 - USA-748 (Starshield Group 1-19)	United States Space Force	Low Earth	TBA	In orbit	Operational
7 November; 00:48:42	USSF-432 (SBST R-4) mission. Sixth of 18 planned missions for the USSF's Space Based Sensing and Targeting (SBST) portfolio. 23 Modified Starshields, suspected to be part of the new Starshield-based Space Data Network Backbone.					
7 November; 13:22	(Russia) Soyuz 2.1b / Fregat-M		(Russia) Plesetsk Cosmodrome Site 43/3		(Russia) RVSN RF	
7 November; 13:22	(Russia) GLONASS-K	Roscosmos	Medium Earth	Navigation	In orbit	Operational
8 November; 20:24	(China) Long March 12		(China) Wenchang LC-2		(China) CASC	
8 November; 20:24	(China) SatNet LEO Group 29	SatNet	Low Earth	Communications	In orbit	Operational
11 November; 11:41	(China) Long March 2D		(China) Jiuquan Site-94		(China) CASC	
11 November; 11:41	(China) Tanluzhe-A (CAS Pathfinder-1A)	Chinese Academy of Sciences	Low Earth (SSO)	Technology demonstration	In orbit	Operational
11 November; 11:41	(China) Tanluzhe-B (CAS Pathfinder-1B)	Chinese Academy of Sciences	Low Earth (SSO)	Technology demonstration	In orbit	Operational
11 November; 11:41	(China) Tanluzhe-C (CAS Pathfinder-1C)	Chinese Academy of Sciences	Low Earth (SSO)	Technology demonstration	In orbit	Operational
11 November; 11:41	(China) Tanluzhe-D (CAS Pathfinder-1D)	Chinese Academy of Sciences	Low Earth (SSO)	Technology demonstration	In orbit	Operational
12 November; 04:36:30	(United States) Falcon 9 Block 5		(United States) Vandenberg SLC-4E		(United States) SpaceX	
12 November; 04:36:30	(United States) USA-749 - USA-771 (Starshield Group 1-20)	United States Space Force	Low Earth	TBA	In orbit	Operational
12 November; 04:36:30	USSF-627 (SBST R-5) mission. Seventh of 18 planned missions for the USSF's Space Based Sensing and Targeting (SBST) portfolio. 23 Modified Starshields, suspected to be part of the new Starshield-based Space Data Network Backbone.					
13 November; 22:47:36	(United States) Starship	Starlink Group 31-2	(United States) Starbase Pad 2		(United States) SpaceX	
13 November; 22:47:36	Starlink × 26	Starlink	Low Earth	Technology demonstration	In orbit	Operational
13 November; 22:47:36	Starship Test Flight 15 became the first launch to feature a successful upper stage recovery					
14 November; 01:16	(Russia) Soyuz-2.1b / Fregat-M		(Russia) Vostochny Site 1S		(Russia) Roscosmos	
14 November; 01:16	(Russia) MKA Kinosputnik	NPK Barl	Low Earth (SSO)	Earth observation satellite	In orbit	Operational
14 November; 01:16	(Russia) KOEN	MT-Lab	Low Earth (SSO)	Earth observation satellite	In orbit	Operational
14 November; 01:16	(Russia) NPO Kaisant (with Germes modem)	NPO Kaisant	Low Earth (SSO)	Technology demonstration	In orbit	Operational
14 November; 01:16	(Russia) NPO Kaisant (with Gonets modem)	NPO Kaisant	Low Earth (SSO)	Technology demonstration	In orbit	Operational
14 November; 05:30	(United States) Electron	The Mountain God Rises	(New Zealand) Mahia LC-1		(United States) Rocket Lab	
14 November; 05:30	(Japan) QPS-SAR-19	iQPS	Low Earth	Earth observation satellite	In orbit	Operational
14 November; 05:30	100th Launch of Rocket Lab Electron.					
15 November; 17:40	(United States) Vulcan Centaur VC6L	LV-01	(United States) Cape Canaveral SLC-41		(United States) ULA	
15 November; 17:40	(United States) LeoSat × 40	Amazon Leo	Low Earth	Communications	15 November 2026	Launch failure
15 November; 17:40	Maiden flight of Vulcan Centaur VC6L Configuration. First launch of the LEO optimized Centaur V upper stage. The launch will also serve as a certification flight for this new configuration for the USSF. First of 38 Vulcan Centaur launches for Amazon Leo. The launch vehicle experienced low booster performance, resulting in stage separation occurring when the vehicle was low in altitude and below minimal velocity to reach orbit.					
18 November; 22:50	(China) Long March 2D		(China) Taiyuan LC-9		(China) CASC	
18 November; 22:50	Shijian-24	TBA	Low Earth (SSO)	TBA	In orbit	Operational
20 November; 11:59	(China) Long March 8A	Y13	(China) Wenchang LC-1		(China) CASC	
20 November; 11:59	(China) SatNet LEO Group 30	SatNet	Low Earth	Communications satellite	In orbit	Operational
21 November; 02:32	(United States) Falcon 9 Block 5		(United States) Vandenberg SLC-4E		(United States) SpaceX	
21 November; 02:32	(United States) USSF-317	United States Space Force	Low Earth	TBA	In orbit	Operational
22 November; 12:23	(United States) Falcon 9 Block 5		(United States) Vandenberg SLC-4E		(United States) SpaceX	
22 November; 12:23	(United States) NROL-136	SpaceX	Low Earth	Reconnaissance satellite	In orbit	Operational
↓ Upcoming launches ↓
23 November; 11:09	(France) Ariane 64	LE-04	(France) Kourou ELA-4		(France) Arianespace	
23 November; 11:09	(United States) LeoSat ×35	Amazon Leo	Low Earth	Communications		
24 November; 05:03	(Russia) Soyuz-2.1b		(Kazakhstan) Baikonur Site 31/6		(Russia) Roscosmos	
24 November; 05:03	(Russia) Progress MS-36	Roscosmos	Low Earth (ISS)	ISS logistics		
24 November; 15:55	(United States) Falcon 9 Block 5		(United States) Vandenberg SLC-4E		(United States) SpaceX	
24 November; 15:55	(United States) USSF-266	United States Space Force	Low Earth	TBA		
25 November; 00:18	(China) Long March 2F		(China) Jiuquan Site 91 (SLS-1)		(China) CASC	
25 November; 00:18	(China) Shenzhou 24	CMSA	Low Earth (TSS)	Human spaceflight		
26 November; 09:35	(China) Long March 2D		(China) Jiuquan Site-94		(China) CASC	
26 November; 09:35	TBA	TBA	TBA	TBA		
27 November; 00:05	(United States) Electron	Night Owl Never Sleeps	(New Zealand) Mahia LC-1B		(United States) Rocket Lab	
27 November; 00:05	(Japan) StriX-13	Synspective	Low Earth	Earth observation		
27 November; 00:05	14th StriX satellite launched by Rocket Lab for Synspective.					
27 November; 13:00	(China) Long March 6A		(China) Taiyuan LC-9A		(China) CASC	
27 November; 13:00	TBA	TBA	TBA	TBA		
29 November; 01:00	(China) Kinetica 1		(China) Haiyang Oriental Spaceport		(China) CAS Space	
29 November; 01:00	TBA	TBA	TBA	TBA		
29 November; 03:50	(China) Long March 6C		(China) Taiyung LC-9A		(China) CASC	
29 November; 03:50	TBA	TBA	TBA	TBA		
29 November; 04:39	(United States) Falcon 9 Block 5		(United States) Vandenberg SLC-4E		(United States) SpaceX	
29 November; 04:39	(United States) USSF-380	United States Space Force	Low Earth	TBA		
29 November; 15:50	(United States) Falcon 9 Block 5		(United States) Cape Canaveral SLC-40		(United States) SpaceX	
29 November; 15:50	(United States) CRS NG-25	Northrop Grumman	Low Earth (ISS)	ISS logistics		
November (TBD)	(South Korea) Mir		(South Korea) Anheung Proving Ground		(South Korea) ADD	
November (TBD)	(South Korea) Demo Flight	ADD	Low Earth	Test flight		
November (TBD)	Maiden flight of Mir					
November (TBD)	(China) Kuaizhou 11		(China) Jiuquan Site 95A		(China) ExPace	
November (TBD)	TBA	TBA	TBA	TBA		

- ← Jan
- Feb
- Mar
- Apr
- May
- Jun
- Jul
- Aug
- Sep
- Oct
- Nov
- Dec →

=== December ===
Date and time (UTC)	Rocket	Flight number	Launch site		LSP	
Date and time (UTC)	Payload (⚀ = CubeSat)	Operator	Orbit	Function	Decay (UTC)	Outcome
Date and time (UTC)	Remarks					
10 December; 07:00	(China) Long March 12		(China) Wenchang LC-2		(China) CASC	
10 December; 07:00	(China) SatNet LEO Group ?	SatNet	Low Earth	Communications		
17 December	(France) Ariane 62		(France) Kourou ELA-4		(France) Arianespace	
17 December	MetOp-SG B1	EUMETSAT	Low Earth (SSO)	Meteorology		
17 December	Second of six MetOp-SG launches					
December (TBD)	(India) HLVM3	G1	(India) Satish Dhawan SLP		(India) ISRO	
December (TBD)	(India) Gaganyaan-1	ISRO	Low Earth	Flight test		
December (TBD)	Maiden flight of HLVM3, the human-rated version of LVM3. First Gaganyaan flight test.					
December (TBD)	(Italy) Vega-C		(France) Kourou ELV		(Italy) Avio	
December (TBD)	(Italy) IRIDE Mission 1	ASI	Low Earth	Earth observation		
December (TBD)	First launch for the Italian IRIDE satellite constellation.					
December (TBD)	(United States) Falcon 9 Block 5		(United States) Cape Canaveral SLC-40		(United States) SpaceX	
December (TBD)	(United States) CHORUS C	MDA	Low Earth	Earth observation		
December (TBD)	(United States) CHORUS X	MDA	Low Earth	Earth observation		
December (TBD)	(United States) Falcon 9 Block 5		(United States) Cape Canaveral SLC-40		(United States) SpaceX	
December (TBD)	(United States) Globalstar 2-R Mission 2	Globalstar	Low Earth orbit	Communications satellite		
December (TBD)	Second Globalstar 2-R mission.					
December (TBD)	(United States) Falcon 9 Block 5		(United States) Vandenberg SLC-4E		(United States) SpaceX	
December (TBD)	(France) Oneweb #21	Oneweb	Low Earth (Polar)	Communications satellite		
December (TBD)	(United States) Falcon 9 Block 5	Starlink Group 15-21	(United States) Vandenberg SLC-4E		(United States) SpaceX	
December (TBD)	(United States) Starlink × 27	SpaceX	Low Earth	Communications		
December (TBD)	(United States) Falcon 9 Block 5		(United States) Vandenberg SLC-4E		(United States) SpaceX	
December (TBD)	(United States) NROL-195	SpaceX	Low Earth	Reconnaissance satellite		

- ← Jan
- Feb
- Mar
- Apr
- May
- Jun
- Jul
- Aug
- Sep
- Oct
- Nov
- Dec →

=== To be determined Q4 ===
Date and time (UTC)	Rocket	Flight number	Launch site		LSP	
Date and time (UTC)	Payload (⚀ = CubeSat)	Operator	Orbit	Function	Decay (UTC)	Outcome
Date and time (UTC)	Remarks					
Q4 (TBD)	(United States) Falcon 9 Block 5		(United States) Vandenberg SLC-4E		(United States) SpaceX	
Q4 (TBD)	(United States) T1TL-D × 21	SDA	Low Earth (SSO)	Military communications		
Q4 (TBD)	(United States) Falcon 9 Block 5		(United States) Vandenberg SLC-4E		(United States) SpaceX	
Q4 (TBD)	(United States) T1TR-C × 7	SDA	Low Earth (SSO)	Missile tracking		
Q4 (TBD)	(United States) Falcon 9 Block 5		(United States) Vandenberg SLC-4E		(United States) SpaceX	
Q4 (TBD)	(United States) T1TR-D × 7	SDA	Low Earth (SSO)	Missile tracking		
Q4 (TBD)	(United States) Falcon 9 Block 5		(United States) Vandenberg SLC-4E		(United States) SpaceX	
Q4 (TBD)	(United States) T1TL-F × 21	SDA	Low Earth	Military Communication		
Q4 (TBD)	(United States) Falcon 9 Block 5		(United States) Vandenberg SLC-4E		(United States) SpaceX	
Q4 (TBD)	(United States) T1TR-A × 7	SDA	Low Earth	Missile tracking		
Q4 (TBD)	(United States) Falcon 9 Block 5		(United States) TBA		(United States) SpaceX	
Q4 (TBD)	(United States) FOO Fighter × 8	SDA	Low Earth	Technology demonstration		
Q4 (TBD)	(United States) Electron		(New Zealand) Mahia LC-1A		(United States) Rocket Lab	
Q4 (TBD)	(United States) BlackSky Gen-3 Mission 6	BlackSky Technology	Low Earth (SSO)	Earth Observation		
Q4 (TBD)	(United States) Electron		(New Zealand) Mahia LC-1A		(United States) Rocket Lab	
Q4 (TBD)	(United States) BlackSky Gen-3 Mission 7	BlackSky Technology	Low Earth (SSO)	Earth Observation		
Q4 (TBD)	(Germany) Spectrum		(Norway) Andøya		(Germany) Isar Aerospace	
Q4 (TBD)	(Austria) AT-Astra	R-Space	Low Earth (SSO)	Technology demonstration		
Q4 (TBD)	(United States) Falcon 9 Block 5		(United States) Cape Canaveral SLC-40		(United States) SpaceX	
Q4 (TBD)	(United States) BlueBird 14	AST SpaceMobile	Low Earth orbit	Communications		
Q4 (TBD)	(United States) BlueBird 15	AST SpaceMobile	Low Earth orbit	Communications		
Q4 (TBD)	(United States) BlueBird 16	AST SpaceMobile	Low Earth orbit	Communications		
Q4 (TBD)	(United States) Starship	Starlink Group 31-3	(United States) Starbase Pad-2		(United States) SpaceX	
Q4 (TBD)	Starlink 31-3	Starlink	Low Earth orbit	Communications satellite		
Q4 (TBD)	(India) LVM3	M7	(India) Satish Dhawan SLP		(India) ISRO	
Q4 (TBD)	(India) GSAT-32 (GSAT-N3)	ISRO	Geosynchronous	Communications		
Q4 (TBD)	GSAT-32 is also Known as GSAT-N3. Planned replacement for GSAT-6A.					
Q4 (TBD)	(France) Zephyr		(France) Kourou ELD		(France) Latitude	
Q4 (TBD)	(France)	Latitude	Low Earth	Flight test		
Q4 (TBD)	Maiden flight of Zephyr.					
Q4 (TBD)	(Russia) Angara A5/Blok DM-03		(Russia) Plesetsk Site 35		(Russia) RVSN RF	
Q4 (TBD)	(Russia) Kosmos Tundra 7L	VKS	Molniya	Early warning		
Q4 (TBD)	(Russia) Rokot-M / Briz-KM		(Russia) Plesetsk Site 133/3		(Russia) Khrunichev / RVSN RF	
Q4 (TBD)	(Russia) Kosmos (Strela-3M)	VKS	Low Earth	Military communications		
Q4 (TBD)	(Russia) Kosmos (Strela-3M)	VKS	Low Earth	Military communications		
Q4 (TBD)	(Russia) Kosmos (Strela-3M)	VKS	Low Earth	Military communications		
Q4 (TBD)	First flight of Rokot-M, a Rokot variant built in Russia without Ukrainian cooperation.					
Q4 (TBD)	(United States) Electron		(New Zealand) Mahia LC-1		(United States) Rocket Lab	
Q4 (TBD)	(United States) LOXSAT 1	Eta Space	Low Earth (SSO)	Propellant depot Technology demonstration		
Q4 (TBD)	(United States) Vulcan Centaur VC6L	LV-02	(United States) Cape Canaveral SLC-41		(United States) ULA	
Q4 (TBD)	(United States) LeoSat × 40	Amazon Leo	Low Earth	Communications		
Q4 (TBD)	(United States) Falcon 9		(United States) Cape Canaveral SLC-40		(United States) SpaceX	
Q4 (TBD)	(United States) USSF-31	U.S. Space Force	TBA	TBA		
Q4 (TBD)	(China) Tianlong-3		(China) Wenchang LC-2		(China) Space Pioneer	
Q4 (TBD)	(China) Test Flight	Space Pioneer	TBA	Flight test		
Q4 (TBD)	Second launch of the Tianlong-3					
Q4 (TBD)	(China) Tianlong-3		(China) Wenchang LC-2		(China) Space Pioneer	
Q4 (TBD)	(China) Test Flight	Space Pioneer	TBA	Flight test		
Q4 (TBD)	Third launch of the Tianlong-3					
Q4 (TBD)	(United States) Vulcan Centaur VC6L	LV-03	(United States) Cape Canaveral SLC-41		(United States) ULA	
Q4 (TBD)	(United States) LeoSat × 40	Amazon Leo	Low Earth	Communications		
Q4 (TBD)	(India) PSLV-XL	C63	(India) Satish Dhawan FLP		(India) ISRO	
Q4 (TBD)	(India) TDS-01	ISRO	Low Earth orbit	Technology demonstration		
Q4 (TBD)	First launch of PSLV since the failure of C62					
Q4 (TBD)	(United States) Electron		(New Zealand) Mahia LC-1		(United States) Rocket Lab	
Q4 (TBD)	(United States) Acadia Mission 4	Capella Space	Low Earth	Earth observation satellite		
Q4 (TBD)	(Germany) Spectrum		(Norway) Andøya		(Germany) Isar Aerospace	
Q4 (TBD)	(Netherlands) CASSINI	ISISpace	Low Earth	Technology demonstration		
Q4 (TBD)	(United States) Electron		(New Zealand) Mahia LC-1		(United States) Rocket Lab	
Q4 (TBD)	(Japan) iQPS Mission 12	iQPS	Low Earth	Earth observation satellite		
Q4 (TBD)	(China) Hyperbola-3		(China) Jiuquan LA-4		(China) i-Space	
Q4 (TBD)	(China) Demo Flight	i-Space	Low Earth	Flight test		
Q4 (TBD)	Maiden flight of Hyperbola-3.					
Q4 (TBD)	(China) Gravity-2		(China) TBA		(China) Orienspace	
Q4 (TBD)	(China) Demo Flight	Orienspace	Low Earth	Flight test		
Q4 (TBD)	Maiden flight of Gravity-2.					
Q4 (TBD)	(China) Long March 10A		(China) Wenchang LC-3		(China) CASC	
Q4 (TBD)	(China) Demo flight	CNSA	Low Earth	Flight test		
Q4 (TBD)	First flight of the single-core Long March 10A variant.					
Q4 (TBD)	(Germany) Spectrum		(Norway) Andøya		(Germany) Isar Aerospace	
Q4 (TBD)	(United States) ΣYNDEO-3	Redwire Corporation	Low Earth	Technology demonstration		
Q4 (TBD)	(China) Long March 12A		(China) Juiquan Long March 12 series pad		(China) CASC	
Q4 (TBD)	(China) Flight 2	CASC	TBA	Flight Test		
Q4 (TBD)	(United States) Starship	Starlink Group 30-1	(United States) Kennedy LC-39A Starship Pad		(United States) SpaceX	
Q4 (TBD)	Starlink 30-1	Starlink	Low Earth orbit	Communications satellite		
Q4 (TBD)	(India) SSLV	SSLV/L-1	(India) Satish Dhawan FLP		(India) ISRO	
Q4 (TBD)	(India) AayulSAT-1A	OrbitAID	Low Earth	Technology demonstration		
Q4 (TBD)	First commercial launch of ISRO's Small Satellite Launch Vehicle (SSLV)					
Q4 (TBD)	(India) Vikram	Flight 2	(India) Satish Dhawan FLP		(India) Skyroot Aerospace	
Q4 (TBD)	⚀ (India) NILA-III	HEX20	Low Earth	Technology demonstration		
Q4 (TBD)	⚀ (India) SCOPE	Skyroot Aerospace	Low Earth	Technology demonstration		

- ← Jan
- Feb
- Mar
- Apr
- May
- Jun
- Jul
- Aug
- Sep
- Oct
- Nov
- Dec →

== Suborbital flights ==
Date and time (UTC)	Rocket	Flight number	Launch site		LSP	
Date and time (UTC)	Payload (⚀ = CubeSat)	Operator	Orbit	Function	Decay (UTC)	Outcome
Date and time (UTC)	Remarks					
1 October; 06:51	(Germany) Red Kite/Impr. Malemute		(Sweden) Esrange		(Germany) MORABA	
1 October; 06:51	(Germany) MAPHEUS-17	DLR	Suborbital	Microgravity research	1 October	Successful
6 October	(France) M51.3		(France) French submarine Le Vigilant Off the coast Finistère		(France) DGA	
6 October	(France)	DGA	Suborbital	Missile test	6 October	Successful
9 October; 07:43	(United States) Minotaur I		(United States) Vandenberg Space Force Base		(United States) Northrop Grumman	
9 October; 07:43	(United States) Mk21A reentry vehicle	Air Force Nuclear Weapons Center	Suborbital	Technology demonstration	9 October	Successful
20 October; 07:07	(Canada) Black Brant IX		(United States) Poker Flat Research Range		(United States) NASA	
20 October; 07:07	(United States) INFUSE-2	University of Colorado	Suborbital	Astronomy	20 October	Successful
20 October; 07:07	Second Integral Field Ultraviolet Spectroscopic Experiment (INFUSE).					
22 October; 05:30	(Canada) Black Brant IX		(United States) Poker Flat Research Range		(United States) NASA	
22 October; 05:30	(United States) DUST III	Goddard Space Flight Center	Suborbital	Astronomy	22 October	Successful
28 October	(Russia) Bulava		(Russia) Generalissimus Suvorov		(Russia) Ministry of Defence	
28 October	(Russia)	Ministry of Defence	Suborbital	Missile test	28 October	Successful
4 November	(France) SyLEx Single-stage		(France) DGA Essais de missiles		(France) Direction générale de l'armement	
4 November	(France) ?	Direction générale de l'armement	Suborbital	?	4 November	Successful
11 November 2026; 22:09	(Canada) Black Brant V		(Sweden) Esrange		(Sweden) SSC	
11 November 2026; 22:09	(Sweden) SYSTER / (United States) COUSIN	KTH	Suborbital	Thermospheric research	11 November 2026	Successful
18 November; 07:01	(United States) Minuteman III	GT-257GM	(United States) Vandenberg LF-10?		(United States) AFGSC	
18 November; 07:01	(United States)	AFGSC	Suborbital	Test flight	18 November	Successful
18 November; 07:01	Re-entered ~4,200 mi (6,800 km) downrange near Kwajalein Atoll.					
↓ Upcoming launches ↓
29 November	(South Korea) Sebit		(Brazil) Alcântara		(South Korea) Innospace	
29 November			Suborbital			
TBD	(Argentina) Tronador II-70		(Argentina) Centro Espacial de Punta Indio		(Argentina) CONAE	
TBD	TBA		Suborbital	Flight test		
TBD	Maiden flight of Tronador II-70. Expected apogee: 150 km (93 mi).					
October (TBD)	(Argentina) Tronador II-70		(Argentina) Centro Espacial de Punta Indio		(Argentina) CONAE	
October (TBD)	TBA		Suborbital	Flight test		
October (TBD)	Second flight of Tronador II-70. Expected apogee: 150 km (93 mi).					
October (TBD)	(Brazil) (Germany) VS-50	V01	(Brazil) Alcântara		(Brazil) IAE / (Germany) DLR	
October (TBD)	TBA	TBA	Suborbital	TBA		
October (TBD)	(Netherlands) T-minus Barracuda		(Canada) Spaceport Nova Scotia		(Canada) Maritime Launch Services	
October (TBD)			Suborbital			
December	(Canada) Black Brant IX		(United States) White Sands Missile Range		(United States) NASA	
December	(United States) MaGIXS-3	Marshall Space Flight Center	Suborbital	Solar physics		
TBD	(Poland) Perun	FLIGHT 5	(Poland) Central Air Force Training Range, Ustka		(Poland) SpaceForest	
TBD			Suborbital			
H2 2026 (TBD)	(Poland) Perun	FLIGHT 6	(Denmark) Eurospaceport North Sea		(Poland) SpaceForest	
H2 2026 (TBD)			Suborbital			
2026 (TBD)	(Canada) Black Brant XIIA		(Norway) Andøya		(United States) NASA	
2026 (TBD)	(United States) Ochre	University of Iowa	Suborbital	Geospace science		
2026 (TBD)	Observing Cusp High-altitude Reconnection and Electrodynamics (OCHRE) mission. Expected apogee 1,100 km (680 mi).					
2026 (TBD)	(Canada) Black Brant IX		(Sweden) Esrange		(United States) NASA	
2026 (TBD)	(United States) LAMP 2	Goddard Space Flight Center	Suborbital	Auroral science		
2026 (TBD)	Second LAMP mission; the first flew on 5 March 2022.					
2026 (TBD)	(Canada) Black Brant IX		(United States) Wallops Flight Facility		(United States) NASA	
2026 (TBD)	(United States) Dynamo-3	Goddard Space Flight Center	Suborbital	Geospace science		
2026 (TBD)	First of two launches.					
2026 (TBD)	(Canada) Black Brant IX		(United States) Wallops Flight Facility		(United States) NASA	
2026 (TBD)	(United States) Dynamo-3	Goddard Space Flight Center	Suborbital	Geospace science		
2026 (TBD)	Second of two launches.					
2026 (TBD)	(Brazil) VSB-30		(Sweden) Esrange		(France) CNES	
2026 (TBD)	(France) CRYOFENIX II	CNES	Suborbital	Technology demonstration		
2026 (TBD)	(Brazil) VSB-30	S1X-6/M18	(Sweden) Esrange		(Sweden) SSC Space	
2026 (TBD)	(Sweden) MASER-18	SSC Space	Suborbital	Microgravity research		
2026 (TBD)	SubOrbital Express Microgravity flight opportunity 6.					
2026 (TBD)	(Brazil) VSB-30		(Sweden) Esrange		(Germany) MORABA	
2026 (TBD)	(Germany) TEXUS-61	DLR / ESA	Suborbital	Microgravity research		
2026 (TBD)	(Brazil) VSB-30		(Sweden) Esrange		(Germany) MORABA	
2026 (TBD)	(Germany) TEXUS-62	DLR / ESA	Suborbital	Microgravity research		
2026 (TBD)	(Brazil) VSB-30		(Sweden) Esrange		(Germany) MORABA	
2026 (TBD)	(Germany) TEXUS-63	DLR / ESA	Suborbital	Microgravity research		
2026 (TBD)	(Canada) Black Brant IX		(Marshall Islands) Reagan Test Site		(United States) NASA	
2026 (TBD)	(United States) Evex-2	Goddard Space Flight Center	Suborbital	Geospace science		
2026 (TBD)	Second Equatorial Vortex Experiment (EVEX). First of two launches.					
2026 (TBD)	(Canada) Black Brant IX		(Marshall Islands) Reagan Test Site		(United States) NASA	
2026 (TBD)	(United States) Evex-2	Goddard Space Flight Center	Suborbital	Geospace science		
2026 (TBD)	Second Equatorial Vortex Experiment (EVEX). Second of two launches.					
2026 (TBD)	(Canada) Black Brant IX		(United States) Poker Flat Research Range		(United States) NASA	
2026 (TBD)	(United States) OGRE	Penn State University	Suborbital	X-ray astronomy		
2026 (TBD)	Off-Plane Grating Rocket Experiment (OGRE).					
2026 (TBD)	(Canada) Black Brant IX		(United States) White Sands Missile Range		NASA	
2026 (TBD)	(United States) LXT	University of Miami	Suborbital	Astrophysics		
2026 (TBD)	Lobster-eye X-ray Telescope (LXT).					
2026 (TBD)	(Canada) Black Brant IX		(United States) White Sands Missile Range		(United States) NASA	
2026 (TBD)	(United States) VERIS-2	United States Naval Research Laboratory	Suborbital	Solar observation		
2026 (TBD)	Second Very High Resolution Imaging Spectrograph (VERIS).					
2026 (TBD)	(United States) Terrier-Improved Malemute?		(United States) Wallops Flight Facility		(United States) NASA	
2026 (TBD)	(United States) Subtec-10	Wallops Flight Facility	Suborbital	Technology demonstration		
2026 (TBD)	(Canada) Aurora-1		(Australia) Koonibba Test Range		(Canada) Reaction Dynamics	
2026 (TBD)	(Canada)		Suborbital	Test flight		
2026 (TBD)	(Australia) Kestrel I	VS02	(Australia) Whalers Way Pad 1		(Australia) AtSpace	
2026 (TBD)	(Australia)	AtSpace	Suborbital	Test flight		
2026 (TBD)	ECO TEST VS02. Second of three test launches from Pad 1 at Whalers Way. Launch vehicle previously tested under the name "Hapith I". Expected apogee: 200 km (120 mi).					
2026 (TBD)	(Australia) Kestrel I	VS03	(Australia) Whalers Way Pad 1		(Australia) AtSpace	
2026 (TBD)	(Australia) TBA	Inovor Technologies	Suborbital	Test flight		
2026 (TBD)	ECO TEST VS03. Third of three test launches from Pad 1 at Whalers Way. Expected apogee: 200 km (120 mi).					
2026 (TBD)	(Germany) SR75		(United Kingdom) SaxaVord Spaceport or (Australia) Koonibba Test Range		(Germany) HyImpulse	
2026 (TBD)	TBA		Suborbital			
2026 (TBD)	First commercial mission.					
TBD	(France) Mesange		(France) Kourou		(France) OPUS Aerospace	
TBD	(France)	OPUS Aerospace	Suborbital	Technology demonstration		
TBD	(Netherlands) T-minus DART		(Republic of Ireland) Location on the West coast of Ireland		(Republic of Ireland) SUAS Aerospace	
TBD	(Republic of Ireland) PATHFINDER	SUAS Aerospace	Suborbital			
TBD	Pathfinder is Ireland's first commercial rocket launch.					
TBD	(South Korea) Blue Whale 1		(South Korea) Setesia 1 offshore platform, Jeju Island		(South Korea) Perigee Aerospace	
TBD	(South Korea)	Perigee Aerospace	Low Earth	Flight Test		
TBD	Suborbital test flight of the Blue Whale 1 orbital launch vehicle.					
TBD	(Netherlands) T-minus DART		(Germany) North Sea launch platform		(Germany) European Spaceport Company GmbH	
TBD	(Netherlands)	T-Minus Engineering	Suborbital	Test flight		
TBD	First launch from the North Sea spaceport. Part of the EOS Demo #1 launch campaign.					
TBD	(New Zealand) KEA-1	Duqm-2	(Oman) Etlaq Spaceport		(Oman) NASCOM	
TBD	⚀ (United Kingdom) Jovian-O	JUPITER	Suborbital	Earth observation / Education		
TBD	⚀ (Taiwan) PocketQube II	SIGHT Space	Suborbital	Record data during flight		
