= ATHENE-1 =

European technology demonstration satellite

- Mission type: Technology demonstration
- COSPAR ID: 2026-227BB
- Website: seranis.de/mission-1

Spacecraft properties
- Bus: Triton-X Heavy
- Manufacturer: (Luxembourg) LuxSpace (Germany) University of the Bundeswehr Munich

Start of mission
- Launch date: 2 October 2026
- Rocket: Falcon 9

Orbital parameters
- Reference system: Geocentric
- Regime: Sun-synchronous
- Seamless Radio Access Network for Internet of Space (SeRANIS)

ATHENE-1 is a technology demonstration satellite developed by LuxSpace and the University of the Bundeswehr Munich as part of the Bundeswehr's research program Seamless Radio Access Networks for Internet of Space (SeRANIS). The satellite's objective is to perform 22 experiments focused on topics including satellite communications, reconnaissance, navigation, machine learning, and in-space data processing. The 400 kg spacecraft is based on the Triton-X Heavy small satellite platform created by LuxSpace. It was launched to Low Earth orbit on 2 October 2026 aboard the Falcon 9 rideshare mission Transporter-18.

Transporter-18 encapsulation
