= Hydra (satellite constellation) =

Spanish thermal imaging satellite constellation

- Country of origin: Spain
- Operator: Aistech
- Website: aistechspace.com

Specifications
- Bus: CubeSat

Production
- Planned: 48
- Launched: 2
- Maiden launch: 11 January 2026
- Last launch: 3 May 2026, 7:00 UTC

Related spacecraft
- Launch vehicle: Falcon 9

Hydra is a satellite constellation of thermal imaging Earth observation small satellites under development by the Spanish company Aistech. It is designed to provide thermal infrared imagery for agriculture, hydrology, environmental risk monitoring, and security applications. In 2023, Hydra has been selected by ESA as one of the Copernicus Contributing Missions (CCMs) providing data to the EU's Copernicus Programme.

== Satellites ==
The first satellite of the constellation, the 6U CubeSat Hydra 2 was launched on 11 January 2026 aboard Falcon 9's rideshare mission Twilight. Aistech published the first images from Hydra 2 in April 2026. The second satellite, Hydra 3, was launched on Falcon 9's CAS500-2 rideshare mission on 3 May 2026 at 7:00 UTC.

== See also ==
- OroraTech – German aerospace company
- HiVE – Earth observation satellite constellation
