= Kasa =

Kasa may refer to

== Places ==
- Kasa (kingdom), a former kingdom in Senegal
- Kasa, Sweden, a village in northern Sweden
- Kasa District, Kyoto, a district in Kyoto, Japan
- Kasa Khurd, a village in Maharashtra, India
- Kasa-Vubu (commune), a district in the Kinshasa, Congo
- Mount Kasa, a mountain in Gifu Prefecture, Japan.

== Radio and television stations ==
- KASA (AM), a defunct radio station (1540 AM) formerly licensed to serve Phoenix, Arizona, United States
- KASA-TV, a television station (channel 27, virtual 2) licensed to Santa Fe, New Mexico, United States

== People ==
- Joseph Kasa-Vubu, first president of Congo
- Lady Kasa, Japanese poet
- Nadasi Kasa, ancient Indian queen
- Tamás Kásás, Hungarian water polo player

== Other uses ==
- Gasa (poetry), a form of Korean poetry
- KASA Stadium, a multipurpose stadium in Assam, India
- Kasa (hat), a Japanese hat
- Kasa-obake, a spirit or monster in Japanese folklore
- Kibera Aeronautics and Space Academy, a project of the Tunapanda Institute, Nairobi, Kenya
- Korea AeroSpace Administration, space agency of South Korea

== See also ==
- Kassa (disambiguation)
- Casa (disambiguation)
