= Space Weather =

- Discipline: Space physics
- Language: English
- Edited by: Noé Lugaz

Publication details
- Publisher: American Geophysical Union
- Impact factor: 4.456 (2020)

Standard abbreviations
- ISO 4: Space Weather

Indexing
- ISSN: 1542-7390

Links
- Journal homepage

Space Weather is an academic journal about space weather published by the American Geophysical Union. Its editor-in-chief is Noé Lugaz. According to the Journal Citation Reports, the journal has a 2020 impact factor of 4.456.
