= Hypersonix =

Australian launch vehicle startup

Hypersonix Launch Systems
- Type: Private
- Industry: Aerospace; Defence; Government
- Founded: December 2019; 6 years ago
- Founders: Michael Smart; David Waterhouse
- Headquarters: Brisbane, Queensland, Australia
- Key people: Matt Hill (CEO); Michael Smart (CTO); Arthur Sinodinos (Board Chairman); James Chiswell (Board Director)
- Services: Aerospace engineering; Additive manufacturing; Hypersonic technology
- Website: hypersonix.com.au

Hypersonix Launch Systems Pty Ltd is an aerospace engineering and advanced manufacturing company based in Australia, developing hydrogen-fuelled scramjet propulsion technology and hypersonic flight vehicles for defence and aerospace applications.

Founded in 2019, the company was established to commercialise hypersonic and scramjet technologies developed through research and flight programs led by founder and Chief Technology Officer Michael Smart, including work with NASA and the University of Queensland's Centre for Hypersonics. The company's stated mission is to develop reusable hydrogen-powered scramjet aircraft capable of sustained hypersonic flight, with a long-term vision of achieving flight to space.

== Technology ==
=== Scramjet engine ===
==== SPARTAN ====
SPARTAN is Hypersonix's proprietary hydrogen-fuelled scramjet engine that is entirely 3D-printed. The air-breathing engine uses CMC materials and has no moving parts. The SPARTAN is designed to deliver improved reliability, sustainability, and cost advantages over more bespoke manufacturing methods.

=== Launch vehicles ===
==== DART AE ====
DART AE is a 3D-printed hypersonic flyer powered by the SPARTAN scramjet engine. Built using additive manufacturing, the boosted launch vehicle is designed to sustain hypersonic flight and emit zero CO2. With a length of 3m, mass of 300kg, range of 1000km, and maximum speed of Mach 7, the aircraft is designed to fly non-ballistic flight patterns at hypersonic speeds.

==== VISR ====
VISR is a fully autonomous, reusable hypersonic aircraft designed hypersonic flight test and evaluation. Operational from a control centre, it can accelerate from Mach 5 to Mach 10 before returning to land on a conventional runway. This aircraft is purpose-built for in-flight manoeuvrability and high-cadence missions, with a flight range of over 2000km.

==== Delta Velos ====
Delta Velos is a fully reusable launch system powered by four, fifth-generation SPARTAN scramjet engines, designed to fly to space and deliver satellites to low Earth orbit. The aircraft is designed to reach speeds of up to Mach 12 and enable access to “any orbit, from any launch site,” with time-to-launch measured in days rather than months.

Hypersonix has also outlined a proposed multi-stage launch architecture for the Delta-Velos, incorporating a rocket booster and additional stages intended for orbital insertion. Delta Velos is described as 12 m long with a 3.5 m wingspan, associated with payload figures of 150 kg and up to 300 kg to low Earth orbit.

== Missions ==
=== HyCAT mission ===
Hypersonix Launch Systems was selected by the United States Defense Innovation Unit (DIU) to provide a hypersonic vehicle under the HyCAT (Hypersonic and High-Cadence Airborne Testing Capabilities) program. The company was selected from over 60 respondents which sought vehicles for high-cadence, long-endurance testing of hypersonic technologies, including platform components, sensing systems, and communications, navigation, guidance, and control systems.

Hypersonix proposed its DART AE vehicle for the program, powered by the company's hydrogen-fuelled SPARTAN scramjet engine.

The HyCAT flight demonstration involves a partnership between Hypersonix and Rocket Lab, which will provide launch services using its HASTE suborbital launch vehicle. Rocket Lab has stated the mission will deploy the DART AE payload during ascent while still within Earth's atmosphere, from NASA’s Launch Complex 2 at the Mid-Atlantic Regional Spaceport on Wallops Island, Virginia.

=== HTCDF initiative ===
In July 2024, Hypersonix Launch Systems was announced as a supplier under the United Kingdom Ministry of Defence’s (UK MoD) Hypersonic Technologies and Capability Development Framework (HTCDF). The framework includes more than 90 accredited suppliers, with the UK MoD stating it expects to spend £1 billion over seven years to deliver the program by sourcing services, technologies and testing capabilities from participating organisations.

Hypersonix stated the HTCDF agreement follows its earlier selection for the United States DIU HyCAT program, and described the HTCDF award as an opportunity to contribute hypersonic technology to defence programs in AUKUS nations. The DART flight vehicle will be used as a hypersonic testbed aircraft to capture in-flight data for future mission capabilities.

== Funding ==
In 2025, Hypersonix Launch Systems raised $46 million AUD in a Series A funding round backed by a consortium of aerospace, defence, and government-linked investors, including the National Reconstruction Fund Corporation (NRFC) and Queensland Investment Corporation (QIC). The round was led by High Tor Capital, with significant contributions from Saab and RKKVC.

The funding will be used to accelerate development and flight testing of its hypersonic platforms, especially ahead of the DART AE flight for the United States Defense Innovation Unit’s HyCAT program. Hypersonix will also use proceeds to expand advance manufacturing capabilities in Queensland and support development of VISR – a next-gen reusable hypersonic aircraft concept intended for defence-related missions.

== Links ==
- Official site
