= Long March 12 =

Chinese medium-lift carrier rocket

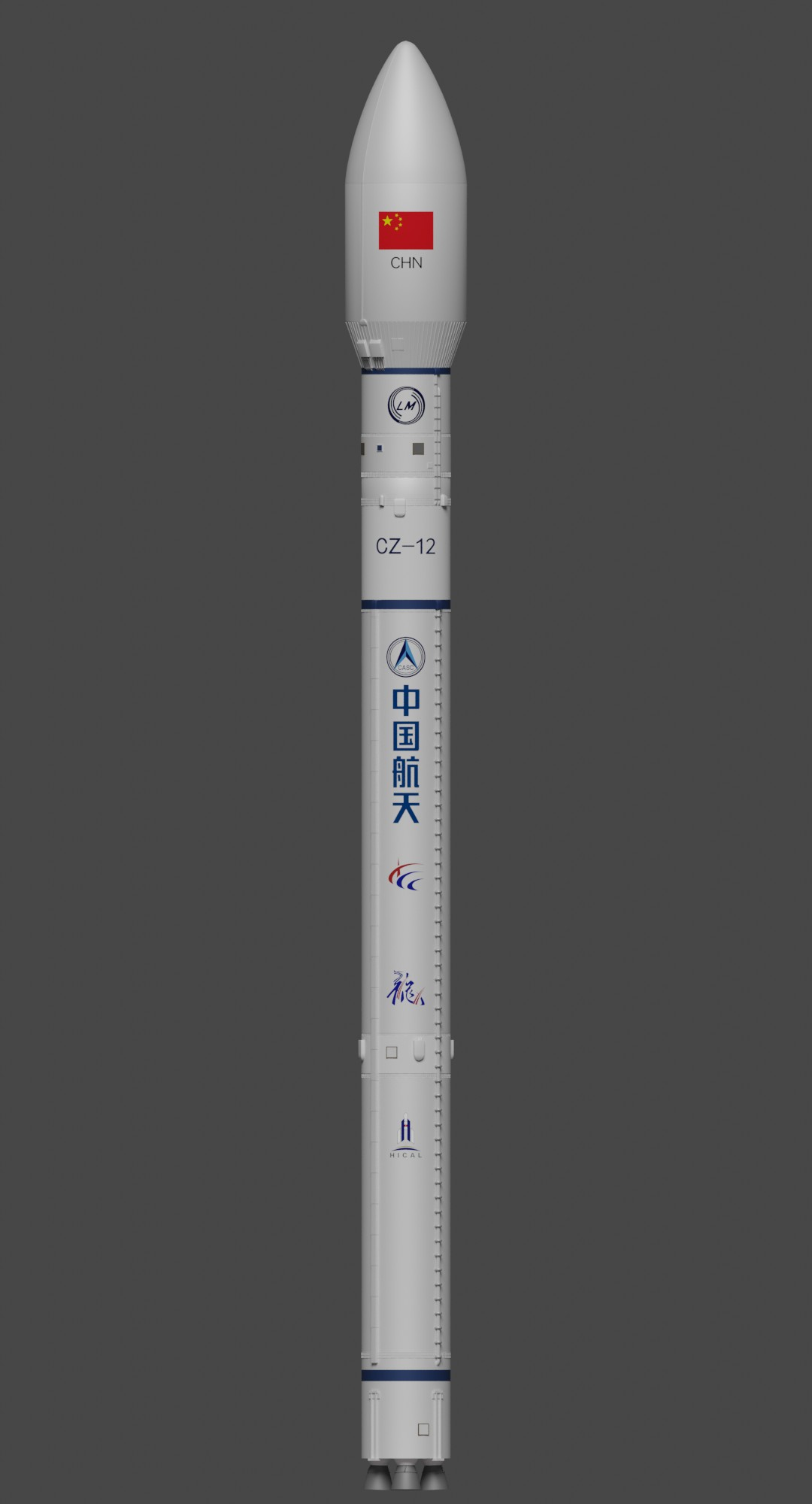
- Rendering of a Long March 12
- Function: Medium-lift launch vehicle
- Manufacturer: Shanghai Academy of Spaceflight Technology
- Country of origin: China

Size
- Height: 62 m (203 ft 5 in)
- Diameter: 3.8 m (12 ft 6 in)
- Mass: 433 t (954,602 lb)
- Stages: 2

Capacity

Payload to LEO
- Altitude: 200 km (120 mi)
- Mass: 12,000 kg (26,000 lb)

Payload to LEO
- Altitude: 300 km (190 mi)
- Mass: 10,000 kg (22,000 lb)

Payload to SSO
- Altitude: 700 km (430 mi)
- Mass: 6,000 kg (13,000 lb)

Associated rockets
- Family: Long March
- Comparable: Long March 7; Long March 8; Angara A5; Ariane 6; Atlas V; Falcon 9; GSLV; H3; LVM3; Soyuz-2; Zenit 2

Launch history
- Status: Active
- Launch sites: Wenchang Commercial, LC-2
- Total launches: 10
- Success(es): 10
- First flight: 30 November 2024
- Last flight: 8 November 2026 (most recent)

First stage
- Powered by: 4 × YF-100K
- Maximum thrust: 5,000 kN (1,100,000 lb_{f})
- Propellant: RP-1 / LOX

Second stage
- Powered by: 2 × YF-115
- Maximum thrust: 360 kN (81,000 lb_{f})
- Propellant: RP-1 / LOX

The Long March 12 (LM-12, Chinese: 长征十二号运载火箭; pinyin: Chang Zheng 12, CZ-12) is a Chinese kerolox medium-lift launch vehicle manufactured by Shanghai Academy of Spaceflight Technology. Capable of placing at least 12 tonnes (26,000 lb) of payload in low Earth orbit (LEO) and at least 6 tonnes (13,000 lb) in a 700 kilometres (430 mi) Sun-synchronous orbit, it first launched in November 2024, from Wenchang Space Launch Site.

The CZ-12 has flown six launches up to June 2026, all to LEO with a Guowang satellite internet constellation payload. Its first stage is powered by four YF-100K engines while its second stage is powered by two YF-115 engines. It is more economical than the medium-lift/heavy-lift Long March 7, which was designed to become human-rated.

There are also two reusable versions of the rocket, Long March 12A and Long March 12B. The CZ-12A variant first flew in December 2025; it successfully reached orbit although the initial first-stage recovery attempt was not successful. The CZ-12B, a commercially-oriented variant, first flew in June 2026; first stage recovery was not attempted.

== History and details ==
=== CZ-12 ===
On 26 February 2024, the China Aerospace Science and Technology Corporation (CASC) released its annual "Blue Book" which detailed the company's launch plans for the coming year; one of the projects revealed in the Blue Book is the new Long March 12 medium-lift rocket. Long March 12 (CZ-12) is designed as a two-stage rocket: its first stage is powered by four YF-100K 1250 KN engines using RP-1 and liquid oxygen while its second stage is powered by two YF-115 180 kN engines also using RP-1/LOX. The rocket offers two payload fairing choices, one with a diameter of 5.2 metres and another with a diameter of 4.2 metres.

CZ-12 has a stage diameter of 3.8 metres, a first for China. It is launched from the new commercial launch site located at China's coastal spaceport in Wenchang.

The maiden launch of the new rocket occurred at 14:25 UTC on 30 November 2024 from the Hainan International Commercial Aerospace Launch Site. There were two payloads on the launch: the “Satellite Internet Technology Test Satellite” and the “Technology Test Satellite-3”. Notably, this launch featured the new YF-100K rocket engine in its initial orbital launch attempt; the engine is a critical component of the under-development superheavy-lift Long March 10 lunar rocket. In addition, the maiden launch of the CZ-12 also constitutes the debut launch from the new Hainan commercial launch site.

=== CZ-12A reusable variant ===
SAST introduced a variant with a reusable first stage, the Long March 12A (CZ-12A), on 23 December 2025. The initial attempt to recover the first stage of the new rocket during its December 2025 first flight was not successful although the rocket successfully placed a mass simulator in orbit. The CZ-12A employs rocket engines based on methane for fuel and liquid-oxygen for the fuel's oxidizer; the CZ-12A's methane-based first-stage engines are built by commercial providers. Despite the different fuel, it has the same 3.8 m diameter as the CZ-12.

=== CZ-12B reusable variant ===
The China Aerospace Science and Technology Corporation Commercial Rocket Co., Ltd. (CACL) is also developing a more powerful variant of the CZ-12A carrier rocket, currently known as the Long March 12B. CACL is an R&D and operations oriented commercial joint venture that appears to operate under the state-owned China Aerospace Science and Technology Corporation (CASC).

CZ-12B has a 4.37 m diameter (in contrast to the 3.8 m diameter of both CZ-12 and CZ-12A). A static fire test of the CZ-12B first stage took place on 16 January 2026 at the Dongfeng Commercial Space Innovation Test Zone within the Jiuquan Satellite Launch Center, northwest China. Its first launch occurred on 1 June 2026.

== Launch statistics ==
CZ-12 only, not including CZ-12A or CZ-12B.

- Failure
- Partial failure
- Success
- Planned

== List of launches ==
Flight Number	Serial number	Date/Time (UTC)	Launch site	Payload	Orbit	Result	Note
1	Y1	30 November 2024; 14:25	Wenchang Commercial, LC-2	Hulianwang Jishu Shiyan 5A; JSW-03	LEO	Success	Maiden flight of Long March 12. - First flight of YF-100K engines. - First launch from WC-LC-2
2	Y2	4 August 2025; 10:21	Wenchang Commercial, LC-2	Hulianwang × 9 (SatNet LEO Group 07)	LEO	Success	
3	Y3	10 November 2025; 02:41	Wenchang Commercial, LC-2	Hulianwang × 9 (SatNet LEO Group 13)	LEO	Success	
4	Y4	11 December 2025; 23:00	Wenchang Commercial, LC-2	Hulianwang × 9 (SatNet LEO Group 16)	LEO	Success	
5	Y5	19 January 2026; 07:48	Wenchang Commercial, LC-2	Hulianwang × 9 (SatNet LEO Group 19)	LEO	Success	
6	Y7	17 June 2026; 02:44	Wenchang Commercial, LC-2	Huliangwang × 9 (SatNet LEO Group 22)	LEO	Success	
7	Y8	16 August 2026; 04:10	Wenchang Commercial, LC-2	Huliangwang × 9 (SatNet LEO Group 24)	LEO	Success	
8	Y9	17 September 2026; 00:32	Wenchang Commercial, LC-2	Huliangwang × 9 (SatNet LEO Group 25)	LEO	Success	
9	Y10	9 October 2026; 19:27	Wenchang Commercial, LC-2	Huliangwang × 9 (SatNet LEO Group 27)	LEO	Success	
10	Y11	8 November 2026; 20:24	Wenchang Commercial, LC-2	Huliangwang × 9 (SatNet LEO Group 29)	LEO	Success	
11	Y?	10 December 2026; 07:00	Wenchang Commercial, LC-2	Huliangwang × 9 (SatNet LEO Group ??)	LEO	Planned	

== See also ==
- China National Space Administration
- List of Long March launches (2025-2029)
- Comparison of orbital launchers families
- Comparison of orbital launch systems
