= List of Long March launches (2025–2029) =

This is a list of launches made by the Long March rocket family between 2025 and 2029.

== Launch statistics ==
=== Rocket configurations ===
- Long March 2C
- Long March 2D
- Long March 2F
- Long March 3B
- Long March 3C
- Long March 4B
- Long March 4C
- Long March 5
- Long March 5B
- Long March 6
- Long March 6A
- Long March 6C
- Long March 7
- Long March 7A
- Long March 8
- Long March 8A
- Long March 10
- Long March 10A
- Long March 10B
- Long March 11
- Long March 12
- Long March 12A
- Long March 12B

=== Launch outcomes ===
- Failure
- Partial failure
- Success
- Planned

== Launch history ==
=== 2025 ===
Date/time (UTC)	Rocket	Serial number	Launch site	Outcome
Date/time (UTC)	Payload	Separation orbit	Operator	Function
Date/time (UTC)	Remarks			
6 January 2025; 20:00 [2025-1] (Note: Local code for 2025 CZ launches used only in the current table)	Long March 3B	Y104	Xichang LC-3	Successful
6 January 2025; 20:00 [2025-1]	Shijian 25	Geostationary transfer	CNSA	Technology verification
6 January 2025; 20:00 [2025-1]	Verification of satellite life-extension technologies, including on-orbit fuel replenishment			
17 January 2025; 4:07 [2025-2]	Long March 2D	Y101	Jiuquan SLS-2	Successful
17 January 2025; 4:07 [2025-2]	Bajisitan PRSC-E01 巴基斯坦PRSC-EO1	Sun-synchronous	Space and Extraordinary Research Commission (SUPARCO)	Earth observation
17 January 2025; 4:07 [2025-2]	Tianlu-1 天路一号	Sun-synchronous	Jianghuai Frontier Technology Collaborative Innovation Center	Earth observation
17 January 2025; 4:07 [2025-2]	Lantan-1 蓝碳一号	Sun-synchronous	Hangzhou University of Electronic Science and Technology	Earth observation
17 January 2025; 4:07 [2025-2]	PRSC-E01 is the first of a three-satellites Pakistani optical remote-sensing constellation			
23 January 2025; 05:15 [2025-3]	Long March 6A	Y6	Taiyuan LA-9A	Successful
23 January 2025; 05:15 [2025-3]	Qianfan Jigui 06 zu 千帆极轨06组 (Thousand Sails Polar Orbit 06 group) (18 satellites)	Polar	Shanghai Spacecom Satellite Technology	Communications
23 January 2025; 05:15 [2025-3]	Fourth batch of 18 satellites launched for the Qianfan megaconstellation			
23 January 2025; 15:32 [2025-4]	Long March 3B	Y---	Xichang LC-2	Successful
23 January 2025; 15:32 [2025-4]	Tongxin Jishu Shiyan Weixing-14	Geostationary transfer	CNSA	Communications/Technology verification
23 January 2025; 15:32 [2025-4]	Classified communications and technology verification satellite			
11 February 2025; 9:30 [2025-5]	Long March 8A	Y1	Wenchang LC-201	Successful
11 February 2025; 9:30 [2025-5]	Weixing Huliangwang Digui Group 02 (01-09)	Low Earth	China Satellite Network Group Co., Ltd. (China SatNet)	Communications
11 February 2025; 9:30 [2025-5]	Maiden launch of the CZ-8A, second batch (9 satellites) of "Guowang" broadband communications megaconstellation			
22 February 2025; 12:11 [2025-6]	Long March 3B	Y101	Xichang LC-2	Successful
22 February 2025; 12:11 [2025-6]	Zhongxing 10R (ChinaSat 10R)	Geostationary transfer	China Satellite Communications Co., Ltd. (China Satcom)	Communications
22 February 2025; 12:11 [2025-6]	Replacement satellite for ChinaSat-10 launched in 2011			
27 February 2025; 7:08 [2025-7]	Long March 2C	Y81	Jiuquan SLS-2	Successful
27 February 2025; 7:08 [2025-7]	Siwei Gaojing-1 03,04 四维高景一号 03,04 (Superview Neo-1 03/04)	Polar	China Siwei (operates under CASC)	Earth observation
27 February 2025; 7:08 [2025-7]	Payload forms part of four on-orbit ultra high-resolution Neo-1 optical satellites (there are also four existing Neo-2 SAR satellites and one Neo-3 ultra-large width satellite). This commercially-focused Earth-observation constellation is expected to grow to 28 satellites eventually. All satellites in this constellation are in 500 km near-polar orbits.			
9 March 2025; 17:17 [2025-8]	Long March 3B	Y--	Xichang LC-3	Successful
9 March 2025; 17:17 [2025-8]	Tongxin Jishu Shiyan Weixing 15 通信技术试验卫星十五号 (Communication Technology Experimental Satellite No. 15)	Geostationary transfer	CNSA	Communications/Technology verification
9 March 2025; 17:17 [2025-8]	"该卫星主要用于开展多频段、高速率卫星通信技术验证。" (This satellite is mainly used to develop and verify multi-band high-speed satellite communication technologies.) Possible classified payload with military applications.			
11 March 2025; 16:38 [2025-9]	Long March 8	Y6	Wenchang Commercial Space Launch Site LC-1	Successful
11 March 2025; 16:38 [2025-9]	Qianfan Xingzhuo Diwu pi zu 千帆星座第五批组 (Thousand Sails Constellation Fifth Group) (18 sattellites)	Polar	Shanghai Spacecom Satellite Technology	Communications
11 March 2025; 16:38 [2025-9]	Fifth batch of 18 satellites launched for the Qianfan megaconstellation. Inaugural launch from Launch Complex 1 of HICAL's Wenchang Commercial Space Launch Site.			
15 March 2025; 4:11 [2025-10]	Long March 2D	Y100	Jiuquan SLS-2	Successful
15 March 2025; 4:11 [2025-10]	Siwei Gaojing-3 02 四维高景三号02	Sun-synchronous	China Siwei	Earth observation
15 March 2025; 4:11 [2025-10]	Tianyan 23 天雁23	Sun-synchronous		Earth observation
15 March 2025; 4:11 [2025-10]	Siwei Gaojing-3 02 is the sister spacecraft of Siwei Gaojing-3 01 launched on 15 April 2024. Siwei Gaojing-3 01 and 02 are likely characterized as "Neo-3 ultra-large width" component of the Siwei Gaojing constellation.			
26 March 2025; 15:55 [2025-11]	Long March 3B	Y---	Xichang LC-2	Successful
26 March 2025; 15:55 [2025-11]	Tianlian-2 04 天链二号04	Geostationary transfer	CNSA	Communications
26 March 2025; 15:55 [2025-11]	Tianlian-2 04 is a "second-generation geosynchronous orbit data relay satellite, mainly used to provide data relay and measurement and control services for manned spacecraft...and space stations, provide data relay and measurement and control services for medium and low orbit resource satellites, and provide measurement and control support for spacecraft launches."			
29 March 2025; 16:05 [2025-12]	Long March 7A	Y11	Wenchang, LC-2	Successful
29 March 2025; 16:05 [2025-12]	Tongxin Jishu Shiyan Weixing 16 通信技术试验卫星十六号 (Communication Technology Test Satellite No. 16)	Geostationary transfer	CNSA	Communications/Technology verification
29 March 2025; 16:05 [2025-12]	The satellite will carry out "...multi-band, high-speed satellite communication technology verification."			
1 April 2025; 4:00 [2025-13]	Long March 2D	Y78	Jiuquan SLS-2	Successful
1 April 2025; 4:00 [2025-13]	Weixing Hulianwang Jishu Shiyan 06 (0001) 卫星互联网技术试验06 (0001)	Low Earth	CNSA	Communications/Technology verification
1 April 2025; 4:00 [2025-13]	Weixing Hulianwang Jishu Shiyan 06 (0002) 卫星互联网技术试验06 (0002)	Low Earth	CNSA	Communications/Technology verification
1 April 2025; 4:00 [2025-13]	Weixing Hulianwang Jishu Shiyan 06 (0003) 卫星互联网技术试验06 (0003)	Low Earth	CNSA	Communications/Technology verification
1 April 2025; 4:00 [2025-13]	Weixing Hulianwang Jishu Shiyan 06 (0004) 卫星互联网技术试验06 (0004)	Low Earth	CNSA	Communications/Technology verification
1 April 2025; 4:00 [2025-13]	The satellites are intended to verify technologies such as mobile broadband direct-to-satellite connection and orbit-to-ground network integration (four Ka-band satellites deployed by this launch)			
3 April 2025; 2:12 [2025-14]	Long March 6	Y14	Taiyuan LA-9A	Successful
3 April 2025; 2:12 [2025-14]	Tianping-3A (02) 天平三号A星02星	Low Earth	CNSA	Radar calibration/Atmospheric research
3 April 2025; 2:12 [2025-14]	Tianping-3A02 is described to be mainly used for ground radar equipment calibration and RCS measurement; it would also provide support for ground optical equipment imaging tests and low-orbit space environment detection and monitoring tests, and provides services for atmospheric space environment measurement and orbit prediction model correction.			
10 April 2025; 16:47 [2025-15]	Long March 3B	Y--	Xichang LC-3	Successful
10 April 2025; 16:47 [2025-15]	Tongxin Jishu Shiyan Weixing 17 通信技术试验卫星十七号 (Communication Technology Experimental Satellite No. 17)	Geostationary transfer	CNSA	Communications/Technology verification
10 April 2025; 16:47 [2025-15]	Just as the previous two similarly-namad satellites launched in March 2025, this satellite is intended to verify multi-band high-speed satellite communication technologies (likely military payload).			
18 April 2025; 22:51 [2025-16]	Long March 6A	Y11	Taiyuan LA-9A	Successful
18 April 2025; 22:51 [2025-16]	Shiyan 27-01 试验二十七号01	Sun-synchronous	CNSA	SSA/Technology verification
18 April 2025; 22:51 [2025-16]	Shiyan 27-02 试验二十七号02	Sun-synchronous	CNSA	SSA/Technology verification
18 April 2025; 22:51 [2025-16]	Shiyan 27-03 试验二十七号03	Sun-synchronous	CNSA	SSA/Technology verification
18 April 2025; 22:51 [2025-16]	Shiyan 27-04 试验二十七号04	Sun-synchronous	CNSA	SSA/Technology verification
18 April 2025; 22:51 [2025-16]	Shiyan 27-05 试验二十七号05	Sun-synchronous	CNSA	SSA/Technology verification
18 April 2025; 22:51 [2025-16]	Shiyan 27-06 试验二十七号06	Sun-synchronous	CNSA	SSA/Technology verification
18 April 2025; 22:51 [2025-16]	"该卫星主要用于空间环境探测及相关技术试验。" (These satellites are mainly used for space environment monitoring and related technical tests.)			
24 April 2025; 9:17:31 [2025-17]	Long March 2F	Y20	Jiuquan SLS-1	Successful
24 April 2025; 9:17:31 [2025-17]	Shenzhou 20	Low Earth (TSS)	CMSA	Crewed spaceflight
24 April 2025; 9:17:31 [2025-17]	Ninth crewed flight to the Tiangong space station, fifteenth Chinese crewed space flight overall			
27 April 2025; 15:54 [2025-18]	Long March 3B	Y--	Xichang LC-2	Successful
27 April 2025; 15:54 [2025-18]	Tianlian 2-05 天链二号05	Geostationary transfer	CNSA	Communications
27 April 2025; 15:54 [2025-18]	" Tianlian II-05 is China's second-generation geosynchronous orbit data-relay satellite. It will provide data relay and TT&C (telemetry, tracking and command) services for manned spacecraft such as spaceships and space stations, for medium and low-Earth-orbit resource satellites, and TT&C support for spacecraft launches."			
28 April 2025; 20:10 [2025-19]	Long March 5B + YZ-2	Y7 + Y3	Wenchang LC-1	Successful
28 April 2025; 20:10 [2025-19]	Weixing Huliangwang Digui Group 03 (01-10) 卫星互联网低轨卫星03组 (Satellite internet low-orbit 03 group)	Low Earth/Polar	China Satellite Network Group Co., Ltd. (China SatNet)	Communications
28 April 2025; 20:10 [2025-19]	Third batch of low-orbit satellites (ten satellites in this batch) for the "Guowang" broadband communications megaconstellation.			
11 May 2025; 13:27 [2025-20]	Long March 6A	Y9	Taiyuan LA-9A	Successful
11 May 2025; 13:27 [2025-20]	Yaogan 40 group 02-01 遥感四十号02组 01 (Remote Sensing No. 40 Group 02-01)	Sun-synchronous	CNSA	ELINT/Technology verification
11 May 2025; 13:27 [2025-20]	Yaogan 40 group 02-02 遥感四十号02组 02 (Remote Sensing No. 40 Group 02-02)	Sun-synchronous	CNSA	ELINT/Technology verification
11 May 2025; 13:27 [2025-20]	Yaogan 40 group 02-03 遥感四十号02组 03 (Remote Sensing No. 40 Group 02-03)	Sun-synchronous	CNSA	ELINT/Technology verification
11 May 2025; 13:27 [2025-20]	"遥感四十号02组卫星主要用于开展电磁环境探测及相关技术试验。" (Yaogan 40 group 02 satellites are mainly used to carry out electromagnetic environment detection and related technical experiments.)			
12 May 2025; 18:09 [2025-21]	Long March 3C	Y--	Xichang LC-3	Successful
12 May 2025; 18:09 [2025-21]	Tongxin Jishu Shiyan Weixing 19 Hao 通信技术试验卫星十九号 (Communication Technology Experimental Satellite No. 19)	Geostationary transfer	CNSA	Communications/Technology verification
12 May 2025; 18:09 [2025-21]	"通信技术试验卫星十九号主要用于开展多频段、高速率卫星通信技术验证。"(The Communication Technology Experimental Satellite No. 19 is mainly used to carry out multi-band, high-speed satellite communication technology verification.)			
14 May 2025; 4:12 [2025-22]	Long March 2D	Y107	Jiuquan SLS-2	Successful
14 May 2025; 4:12 [2025-22]	Taikong Jisuan Weixing Xingzuo (01-12) 太空计算卫星星座 (01-12); Space Computing Satellite Constellation (01-12)	Sun-synchronous	ADA Space, Zhejiang Lab	Communications/Data-processing
14 May 2025; 4:12 [2025-22]	Payload consists of 12 "computing satellites" which are the first components of the future 2,800-satellites strong Three-Body Computing Constellation. "The satellites feature advanced AI capabilities, up to 100 Gbps laser inter-satellite links and remote sensing payloads—data from which will be processed onboard, reducing data transmission requirements. One satellite also carries a cosmic X-ray polarimeter developed by Guangxi University and the National Astronomical Observatories of the Chinese Academy of Sciences (NAOC), which will detect, identify and classify transient events such as gamma-ray bursts, while also triggering messages to enable followup observations by other missions."			
20 May 2025; 11:50 [2025-23]	Long March 7A	Y15	Wenchang, LC-201	Successful
20 May 2025; 11:50 [2025-23]	Zhongxing 3B 中星3B (ChinaSat 3B)	Geostationary transfer	CNSA	Communications
20 May 2025; 11:50 [2025-23]	中星3B卫星主要用于为用户提供话音、数据、广播电视传输业务。 (ChinaSat 3B satellite is mainly used to provide users with voice, data, radio and television transmission services.)			
28 May 2025; 17:31 [2025-24]	Long March 3B	Y110	Xichang LC-2	Successful
28 May 2025; 17:31 [2025-24]	Tianwen-2 天问二号	Heliocentric	CNSA	Asteroid-comet space probe/Asteroid sample-return
28 May 2025; 17:31 [2025-24]	Space probe to orbit and return sample from the co-orbital near-Earth asteroid 469219 Kamoʻoalewa; subsequently to become an orbiter of the main-belt comet 311P/PanSTARRS.			
29 May 2025; 4:12 [2025-25]	Long March 4B	Y62	Jiuquan SLS-2	Successful
29 May 2025; 4:12 [2025-25]	Shijian-26 实践二十六号	Sun-synchronous	CNSA	Earth observation
29 May 2025; 4:12 [2025-25]	实践二十六号卫星主要用于国土普查、环境治理等领域，为国民经济建设提供信息服务。 (The Practice 26 satellite is mainly used in the fields of land survey, environmental governance, etc., and provides information services for national economic construction.)			
5 June 2025; 20:45 [2025-26]	Long March 6A	Y8	Taiyuan LA-9A	Successful
5 June 2025; 20:45 [2025-26]	Weixing Huliangwang Digui 04 Zu 卫星互联网低轨04组 (Satellite internet low-orbit 04 group)	Low Earth/Polar	China Satellite Network Group Co., Ltd. (China SatNet)	Communications
5 June 2025; 20:45 [2025-26]	Fourth batch of low-orbit satellites (five satellites) for the "Guowang" broadband communications megaconstellation.			
14 June 2025; 7:56 [2025-27]	Long March 2D	Y42	Jiuquan SLS-2	Successful
14 June 2025; 7:56 [2025-27]	Zhangheng 1-02 张衡一号-02	Sun-synchronous	CNSA	Earth observation
14 June 2025; 7:56 [2025-27]	"地球物理场空间观测领域探测" (Space decection of in-situ geophysical fields) Current mission will complement the 张衡一号-01 mission, launched in 2018. Mission involves Chinese-Italian collaboration.)			
20 June 2025; 12:37 [2025-28]	Long March 3B	Y--	Xichang LC-2	Successful
20 June 2025; 12:37 [2025-28]	Zhongxing 9C 中星9C (ChinaSat 9C)	Geostationary transfer	China Satellite Communications, a subsidiary of the CASC	Communications
20 June 2025; 12:37 [2025-28]	"中星9C卫星由中国航天科技集团有限公司五院抓总研制，是广播电视专用直播卫星，采用我国自主研发的东方红四号增强型卫星平台，星上设计了Ku BSS等频段载荷。该卫星起飞重量为5.5吨，设计寿命15年，整星功率14.4千瓦，有效载荷功耗达11千瓦，" (The ChinaSat 9C satellite was developed by the Fifth Academy of China Aerospace Science and Technology Corporation. It is a live broadcast satellite dedicated to radio and television. It uses the Dongfanghong-4 enhanced satellite platform independently developed by our nation. The satellite is designed with Ku BSS and other frequency band payloads. The satellite has a takeoff weight of 5.5 tons, a design life of 15 years, a total satellite power of 14.4 kilowatts, and a payload power consumption of 11 kilowatts,) "该星投入使用后，我国在轨广电专用传输和直播卫星将全面实现国产化。" (After the satellite is put into use, our nation's on-orbit television-transmission and broadcast satellites will be fully localized [i.e. "made in China"].)			
3 July 2025; 9:35 [2025-29]	Long March 4C	Y63	Xichang LC-3	Successful
3 July 2025; 9:35 [2025-29]	Shiyan 28B-01 试验二十八号B星01星	Low Earth	CNSA	SSA/Technology verification
3 July 2025; 9:35 [2025-29]	"试验二十八号B星01星主要用于空间环境探测及相关技术试验。" (Shiyan 28B-01 is mainly used for space environment detection and related technical tests.)			
14 July 2025; 21:34 [2025-30]	Long March 7	Y10	Wenchang, LC-201	Successful
14 July 2025; 21:34 [2025-30]	Tianzhou 9 天舟九号	Low Earth (TSS)	CNSA	Space logistics
14 July 2025; 21:34 [2025-30]	Eighth cargo flight to the CSS, delivering routine supplies along with 2 new spacesuits and 776 kg of scientific payload. Heaviest payload (~7,400 kg) ever delivered by a Tianzhou spacecraft			
27 July 2025; 10:03 [2025-31]	Long March 6A	Y14	Taiyuan LA-9A	Successful
27 July 2025; 10:03 [2025-31]	Weixing Huliangwang Digui 05 Zu 卫星互联网低轨05组 (Satellite internet low-orbit 05 group)	Low Earth/Polar	China Satellite Network Group Co., Ltd. (China SatNet)	Communications
27 July 2025; 10:03 [2025-31]	Fifth batch of low-orbit satellites (five satellites) for the "Guowang" broadband communications megaconstellation.			
30 July 2025; 07:49 [2025-32]	Long March 8A	Y3	Wenchang Commercial Space Launch Site LC-1	Successful
30 July 2025; 07:49 [2025-32]	Weixing Huliangwang Digui 06 Zu 卫星互联网低轨06组 (Satellite internet low-orbit 06 group)	Low Earth	China Satellite Network Group Co., Ltd. (China SatNet)	Communications
30 July 2025; 07:49 [2025-32]	Sixth batch of low-orbit satellites (nine satellites) for the "Guowang" broadband communications megaconstellation.			
4 August 2025; 10:21 [2025-33]	Long March 12	Y2	Wenchang Commercial Space Launch Site LC-2	Successful
4 August 2025; 10:21 [2025-33]	Weixing Huliangwang Digui 07 Zu 卫星互联网低轨07组 (Satellite internet low-orbit 07 group)	Low Earth	China Satellite Network Group Co., Ltd. (China SatNet)	Communications
4 August 2025; 10:21 [2025-33]	Seventh batch of satellites (9 satellites) for the "Guowang" broadband communications megaconstellation.			
13 August 2025; 06:43 [2025-34]	Long March 5B + YZ-2	Y8 + Y4	Wenchang LC-101	Successful
13 August 2025; 06:43 [2025-34]	Weixing Huliangwang Digui 08 Zu (01-10) 卫星互联网低轨08组 (Satellite internet low-orbit 08 group)	Low Earth/Polar	China Satellite Network Group Co., Ltd. (China SatNet)	Communications
13 August 2025; 06:43 [2025-34]	Eighth batch of low-orbit satellites (ten satellites) for the "Guowang" broadband communications megaconstellation.			
17 August 2025; 08:55 [2025-35]	Long March 4C	Y64	Xichang LC-3	Successful
17 August 2025; 08:55 [2025-35]	Shiyan 28B-02 试验二十八号B星02星 (Experimental satellite 28B-02)	Low Earth	CNSA	SSA/Technology verification
17 August 2025; 08:55 [2025-35]	"Shiyan satellite 28B-02 is primarily used for space environment monitoring and related technology experiments." ("试验二十八号B星02星主要用于空间环境探测及相关技术试验。")			
17 August 2025; 14:15 [2025-36]	Long March 6A	Y10	Taiyuan LA-9A	Successful
17 August 2025; 14:15 [2025-36]	Weixing Huliangwang Digui 09 Zu 卫星互联网低轨09组 (Satellite internet low-orbit 09 group)	Low Earth/Polar	China Satellite Network Group Co., Ltd. (China SatNet)	Communications
17 August 2025; 14:15 [2025-36]	Ninth batch of low-orbit satellites (five satellites) for the "Guowang" broadband communications megaconstellation.			
25 August 2025; 19:08 [2025-37]	Long March 8A	Y2	Wenchang Commercial Space Launch Site LC-1	Successful
25 August 2025; 19:08 [2025-37]	Weixing Huliangwang Digui 10 Zu 卫星互联网低轨10组 (Satellite internet low-orbit group 10)	Low Earth	China Satellite Network Group Co., Ltd. (China SatNet)	Communications
25 August 2025; 19:08 [2025-37]	10th batch of low-orbit satellites (9 satellites) for the "Guowang" broadband communications megaconstellation.			
5 September 2025; 02:34 [2025-38]	Long March 3C + YZ-1	Y-- + Y-	Xichang LC-2	Successful
5 September 2025; 02:34 [2025-38]	Shiyan 29 Hao Weixing 试验二十九号卫星 (Experimental Satellite No. 29)	Geostationary transfer	CNSA	SSA/Technology verification
5 September 2025; 02:34 [2025-38]	"试验二十九号卫星主要用于空间环境探测及相关技术试验。"(Shiyan 29 Satellite is primarily used for space environment monitoring and related technology testing.)			
6 September 2025; 16:34 [2025-39]	Long March 6A	Y12	Taiyuan LA-9A	Successful
6 September 2025; 16:34 [2025-39]	Yaogan 40 Hao 03 Zu Weixing (01) 遥感四十号03组卫星 (01) (Remote Sensing Satellite number 40 group 03-01)	Sun-synchronous	CNSA	ELINT/Technology verification
6 September 2025; 16:34 [2025-39]	Yaogan 40 Hao 03 Zu Weixing (02) 遥感四十号03组卫星 (02) (Remote Sensing Satellite number 40 group 03-02)	Sun-synchronous	CNSA	ELINT/Technology verification
6 September 2025; 16:34 [2025-39]	Yaogan 40 Hao 03 Zu Weixing (03) 遥感四十号03组卫星 (03) (Remote Sensing Satellite number 40 group 03-03)	Sun-synchronous	CNSA	ELINT/Technology verification
6 September 2025; 16:34 [2025-39]	"遥感四十号03组卫星主要用于开展电磁环境探测及相关技术试验。" (Remote Sensing Satellite number 40 group 03 is primarily designed to conduct electromagnetic environment monitoring and related technical testing.) Three satellites in this group.			
9 September 2025; 02:00 [2025-40]	Long March 7A	Y14	Wenchang, LC-201	Successful
9 September 2025; 02:00 [2025-40]	Yaogan 45 Weixing 遥感四十五号卫星 (Remote Sensing Satellite number 45)	MEO	CNSA	Earth observation
9 September 2025; 02:00 [2025-40]	"遥感四十五号卫星主要用于科学试验、国土资源普查、农产品估产和防灾减灾等领域。 " (The Remote Sensing Satellite No. 45 is mainly used in scientific experiments, land and resources surveys, agricultural product estimation, and disaster prevention and mitigation.)			
16 September 2025; 1:06 [2025-41]	Long March 2C + YZ-1S	Y-- + Y--	Jiuquan SLS-2	Successful
16 September 2025; 1:06 [2025-41]	Wèixīng hùliánwǎng jìshù shìyàn wèixīng (01) 衛星互聯網技術試驗衛星 (01) (Satellite Internet Technology Experimental Satellite [01])	Low Earth	CNSA	Communications/Technology verification
16 September 2025; 1:06 [2025-41]	Wèixīng hùliánwǎng jìshù shìyàn wèixīng (02) 衛星互聯網技術試驗衛星 (02) (Satellite Internet Technology Experimental Satellite [02])	Low Earth	CNSA	Communications/Technology verification
16 September 2025; 1:06 [2025-41]	Wèixīng hùliánwǎng jìshù shìyàn wèixīng (03) 衛星互聯網技術試驗衛星 (03) (Satellite Internet Technology Experimental Satellite [03])	Low Earth	CNSA	Communications/Technology verification
16 September 2025; 1:06 [2025-41]	Wèixīng hùliánwǎng jìshù shìyàn wèixīng (04) 衛星互聯網技術試驗衛星 (04) (Satellite Internet Technology Experimental Satellite [04])	Low Earth	CNSA	Communications/Technology verification
16 September 2025; 1:06 [2025-41]	Four satellites in this launch. "今天，我国在酒泉卫星发射中心使用长征二号丙运载火箭/远征一号S上面级，成功将卫星互联网技术试验卫星发射升空，卫星顺利进入预定轨道，发射任务获得圆满成功。" (Today, our nation successfully launched a satellite internet technology experimental satellite [衛星互聯網技術試驗衛星 Wèixīng hùliánwǎng jìshù shìyàn wèixīng] from the Jiuquan Satellite Launch Center using a Long March 2C carrier rocket and the Yuanzheng 1S upper stage. The satellite smoothly entered its planned orbit, marking a complete success.)			
26 September 2025; 19:28 [2025-42]	Long March 4C	Y45	Jiuquan SLS-2	Successful
26 September 2025; 19:28 [2025-42]	Fengyun-3H (Fengyun 3-08) 风云三号08星 (Wind and Clouds 3-08 satellite)	Sun-synchronous	CNSA	Meteorological
26 September 2025; 19:28 [2025-42]	"本次发射的风云三号H星是我国第二代低轨气象卫星系列风云三号的第8颗卫星，也是风云气象卫星连续成功发射的第22颗卫星，主要用于实现天气预报、大气化学和气候变化监测。" (The Fengyun-3H satellite launched on this occasion is the eighth satellite in our nation's Fengyun-3 series of second-generation low-orbit meteorological satellites, it is also the 22nd consecutive successful launch of the Fengyun meteorological satellites. It is primarily used for weather forecasting, atmospheric chemistry, and climate change monitoring.)			
27 September 2025; 12:40 [2025-43]	Long March 6A	Y16	Taiyuan LA-9A	Successful
27 September 2025; 12:40 [2025-43]	Weixing Huliangwang Digui 11 Zu 卫星互联网低轨11组 (Satellite internet low-orbit 11 group)	Low Earth/Polar	China Satellite Network Group Co., Ltd. (China SatNet)	Communications
27 September 2025; 12:40 [2025-43]	11th batch of low-orbit satellites (five satellites) for the "Guowang" broadband communications megaconstellation.			
29 September 2025; 03:00 [2025-44]	Long March 2D	Y94	Xichang LC-3	Successful
29 September 2025; 03:00 [2025-44]	Shiyan 30 Hao Weixing 01 Xing 试验三十号卫星01星 (Experimental Satellite No.30, 01)	Low Earth	CNSA	Earth observation
29 September 2025; 03:00 [2025-44]	Shiyan 30 Hao Weixing 02 Xing 试验三十号卫星02星 (Experimental Satellite No.30, 02)	Low Earth	CNSA	Earth observation
29 September 2025; 03:00 [2025-44]	"试验三十号卫星01、02星主要用于对地观测技术试验验证"(Experimental Satellite Number-30, 01, 02 will be mainly employed for the experimentation and validation of Earth-observation technologies.)			
13 October 2025; 10:00 [2025-45]	Long March 2D	Y92	Jiuquan SLS-2	Successful
13 October 2025; 10:00 [2025-45]	Shiyan 31 Hao Weixing 试验三十一号卫星 (Experimental Satellite No.31)	Low Earth/Polar	CNSA	Earth observation
13 October 2025; 10:00 [2025-45]	"试验三十一号卫星主要用于开展新型光学成像技术验证。"(Experimental Satellite Number-31 will be mainly employed to develop new optical imaging technologies.)			
16 October 2025; 01:33 [2025-46]	Long March 8A	Y4	Wenchang Commercial Space Launch Site LC-1	Successful
16 October 2025; 01:33 [2025-46]	Weixing Huliangwang Digui 12 Zu 卫星互联网低轨12组 (Satellite internet low-orbit group 12)	Low Earth	China Satellite Network Group Co., Ltd. (China SatNet)	Communications
16 October 2025; 01:33 [2025-46]	12th batch of low-orbit satellites (9 satellites) for the "Guowang" broadband communications megaconstellation. This is also the 600th launch of the Long March series of rockets.			
17 October 2025; 07:08 [2025-47]	Long March 6A	Y24	Taiyuan LA-9A	Successful
17 October 2025; 07:08 [2025-47]	Qianfan Jigui 18 Zu 千帆极轨18组 (Thousand Sails Polar Orbit 18th group)	Polar	Shanghai Spacecom Satellite Technology	Communications
17 October 2025; 07:08 [2025-47]	Sixth batch of 18 satellites launched for the Qianfan megaconstellation.			
23 October 2025; 14:30 [2025-48]	Long March 5	Y9	Wenchang LC-101	Successful
23 October 2025; 14:30 [2025-48]	Tongxin Jishu Shiyan Weixing 20 Hao 通信技术试验卫星二十号 (Communications Technology Experimental Satellite No. 20)	Geostationary transfer	CNSA	Communications/Technology verification
23 October 2025; 14:30 [2025-48]	"通信技术试验卫星二十号主要用于开展多频段、高速率卫星通信技术验证。" (Communication Technology Experimental Satellite (Tōngxìn jìshù shìyàn wèixīng) No. 20 is primarily designed to verify multi-band, high-speed satellite communications technology.)			
26 October 2025; 03:55 [2025-49]	Long March 3B	Yxxx	Xichang LC-3	Successful
26 October 2025; 03:55 [2025-49]	Gaofen-14 Hao 02 Xing 高分十四号02星 (High Resolution No. 14 02)	Sun-synchronous	CNSA	Earth observation
26 October 2025; 03:55 [2025-49]	"高分十四号02星可高效获取全球范围高精度立体影像，测制大比例尺数字地形图，生产数字高程模型、数字表面模型和数字正射影像图等产品，为国民经济和国防建设提供基础地理信息保障。"(The Gaofen-14 satellite can efficiently acquire high-precision stereo imagery across the globe, produce large-scale digital topographic maps, and generate products such as digital elevation models, digital surface models, and digital orthophotos, providing fundamental geographic information support for national economic and national defense development.)			
31 Oclober 2025; 15:44:46 [2025-50]	Long March 2F	Y21	Jiuquan SLS-1	Successful
31 Oclober 2025; 15:44:46 [2025-50]	Shenzhou 21	Low Earth (TSS)	CMSA	Crewed spaceflight
31 Oclober 2025; 15:44:46 [2025-50]	10th crewed flight to the Tiangong space station, sixteenth Chinese crewed space flight overall.			
3 November 2025; 03:47 [2025-51]	Long March 7A	Yx	Wenchang LC-201	Successful
3 November 2025; 03:47 [2025-51]	Yaogan 46 Hao Weixing 遥感四十六号卫星 (Remote Sensing Satellite number 46)	MEO	CNSA	Earth Observation
3 November 2025; 03:47 [2025-51]	"遥感四十六号卫星主要用于防灾减灾、国土资源勘察、水利气象等领域。" (The Yaogan-46 satellite will primarily be used for disaster prevention and mitigation, land resource surveys, and water conservancy and meteorological research.)			
8 November 2025; 21:01 [2025-52]	Long March 11	HY6	"Oriental Aerospace Port" (Dong Fang Hang Tian Gang); Sea-launch from converted barge offshore of Rizhao, in the Yellow Sea	Successful
8 November 2025; 21:01 [2025-52]	Shiyan 32 Hao Weixing 01 试验三十二号卫星01星 (Experimental Satellite Number-32 01)	Low Earth	CNSA	Technology verification
8 November 2025; 21:01 [2025-52]	Shiyan 32 Hao Weixing 02 试验三十二号卫星02星 (Experimental Satellite Number-32 02)	Low Earth	CNSA	Technology verification
8 November 2025; 21:01 [2025-52]	Shiyan 32 Hao Weixing 03 试验三十二号卫星03星 (Experimental Satellite Number-32 03)	Low Earth	CNSA	Technology verification
8 November 2025; 21:01 [2025-52]	"该卫星主要用于开展空间新技术试验。" (The satellites will be mainly used to develop novel space technological experiments.)			
10 November 2025; 02:41 [2025-53]	Long March 12	Y3	Wenchang Commercial Space Launch Site LC-2	Successful
10 November 2025; 02:41 [2025-53]	Weixing Huliangwang Digui 13 Zu 卫星互联网低轨13组 (Satellite internet low-orbit 13th group)	Low Earth	China Satellite Network Group Co., Ltd. (China SatNet)	Communications
10 November 2025; 02:41 [2025-53]	Thirteenth batch of satellites (9 satellites) for the "Guowang" broadband communications megaconstellation.			
19 November 2025; 4:01 [2025-54]	Long March 2C	Yxx	Jiuquan SLS-2	Successful
19 November 2025; 4:01 [2025-54]	Shijian 30-A 实践三十号A星 (Practice No. 30-A satellite)	Low Earth	CNSA	ELINT/Technology verification
19 November 2025; 4:01 [2025-54]	Shijian 30-B 实践三十号B星 (Practice No. 30-B satellite)	Low Earth	CNSA	ELINT/Technology verification
19 November 2025; 4:01 [2025-54]	Shijian 30-C 实践三十号C星 (Practice No. 30-C satellite)	Low Earth	CNSA	ELINT/Technology verification
19 November 2025; 4:01 [2025-54]	"实践三十号A、B、C星主要用于空间环境探测及相关技术验证。" (The Shijian-30 A, B, and C satellites are mainly used for space environment exploration and related technology verification.)			
21 November 2025; 10:55 [2025-55]	Long March 3B	Yxxx	Xichang LC-2	Successful
21 November 2025; 10:55 [2025-55]	Tongxin Jishu Shiyan Weixing 21 Hao 通信技术试验卫星二十一号 (Communication Technology Experimental Satellite No. 21)	MEO/Molniya orbit	CNSA	Communications/Technology verification
21 November 2025; 10:55 [2025-55]	"通信技术试验卫星二十一号主要用于卫星通信、广播电视、数据传输等业务，并开展相关技术试验验证。" (The Communication Technology Test Satellite No. 21 is mainly used for satellite communication, broadcasting, data transmission, and other services, and will conduct related technology tests and verifications.)			
25 November 2025; 04:11:45 [2025-56]	Long March 2F	Y22	Jiuquan SLS-1	Successful
25 November 2025; 04:11:45 [2025-56]	Shenzhou 22	Low Earth (TSS)	CMSA	Uncrewed flight of crewed spacecraft
25 November 2025; 04:11:45 [2025-56]	Delivery of an uncrewed Shenzhou spacecraft to the CSS as a return vehicle for the Shenzhou 21 crew after the SZ-21 spacecraft was used by the SZ-20 crew to return to Earth. The SZ-20 spacecraft sustained some damage from orbital debris and was deemed insufficiently safe as a return vehicle.			
30 November 2025; 12:20 [2025-57]	Long March 7A	Y10	Wenchang LC-201	Successful
30 November 2025; 12:20 [2025-57]	Shijian-28 Weixing 实践二十八号卫星 (Practice No. 28 satellite)	Geostationary transfer	CNSA	SSA/Technology verification
6 December 2025; 07:53 [2025-58]	Long March 8A	Y5	Wenchang Commercial Space Launch Site LC-1	Successful
6 December 2025; 07:53 [2025-58]	Weixing Huliangwang Digui 14 Zu 卫星互联网低轨14组 (Satellite internet low-orbit 14th group)	Low Earth	China Satellite Network Group Co., Ltd. (China SatNet)	Communications
6 December 2025; 07:53 [2025-58]	Foureenth batch of satellites (9 satellites) for the "Guowang" broadband communications megaconstellation.			
8 December 2025; 22:11 [2025-59]	Long March 6A	Y15	Taiyuan LA-9A	Successful
8 December 2025; 22:11 [2025-59]	Weixing Huliangwang Digui 15 Zu 卫星互联网低轨15组 (Satellite internet low-orbit 15 group)	Low Earth/Polar	China Satellite Network Group Co., Ltd. (China SatNet)	Communications
8 December 2025; 22:11 [2025-59]	Fifteenth batch of low-orbit satellites (five satellites) for the "Guowang" broadband communications megaconstellation.			
9 December 2025; 3:41 [2025-60]	Long March 4B	Y64	Jiuquan SLS-2	Successful
9 December 2025; 3:41 [2025-60]	Yaogan 47 Hao Weixing 遥感四十七号卫星 (Remote Sensing Satellite number 47)	Sun-synchronous	CNSA	Earth observation
9 December 2025; 3:41 [2025-60]	"遥感四十七号卫星主要用于国土普查、城市规划、路网设计、农作物估产、环境治理和综合防灾减灾等领域。" (Yaogan 47 satellite will be mainly used in fields such as national land survey, urban planning, road network design, crop yield estimation, environmental management, and comprehensive disaster prevention and mitigation.)			
9 December 2025; 15:08 [2025-61]	Long March 3B	Yxxx	Xichang LC-2	Successful
9 December 2025; 15:08 [2025-61]	Tongxin Jishu Shiyan Weixing 22 Hao 通信技术试验卫星二十二号 (Communication Technology Experimental Satellite No. 22)	MEO	CNSA	Communications/Technology verification
9 December 2025; 15:08 [2025-61]	"通信技术试验卫星二十二号主要用于卫星通信、广播电视、数据传输等业务，并开展相关技术试验验证。" (The satellite will primarily be used for satellite communication, broadcasting, data transmission, and related technology testing and verification.)			
11 December 2025; 23:00 [2025-62]	Long March 12	Y4	Wenchang Commercial Space Launch Site LC-2	Successful
11 December 2025; 23:00 [2025-62]	Weixing Huliangwang Digui 16 Zu 卫星互联网低轨16组 (Satellite internet low-orbit 16th group)	Low Earth	China Satellite Network Group Co., Ltd. (China SatNet)	Communications
11 December 2025; 23:00 [2025-62]	Sixteenth batch of satellites (9 satellites) for the "Guowang" broadband communications megaconstellation.			
16 December 2025; 3:17 [2025-63]	Long March 4B	Y61	Taiyuan LA-xx	Successful
16 December 2025; 3:17 [2025-63]	Ziyuan 3 Hao 04 资源三号04 (Resource Number 3-04)	Sun-synchronous	CNSA	Earth observation
16 December 2025; 3:17 [2025-63]	"资源三号04星是国家民用空间基础设施中长期发展规划的业务卫星，配置了三线阵立体测绘相机、多光谱相机、激光测高仪等载荷，可获取高分辨率立体影像和多光谱影像。资源三号04星将与在轨工作的资源三号02、03星，形成业务卫星组网观测能力，主要用于满足大比例尺立体测绘生产及基础地理信息产品更新需求，为地理信息资源建设、自然资源调查监测、国土空间规划与用途管制、自然资源督察执法等自然资源主体业务提供高精度数据产品。" (The ZY-3 04 satellite is an operational satellite under the National Civil Space Infrastructure Medium- and Long-Term Development Plan. Equipped with a three-line array stereo mapping camera, a multispectral camera, and a laser altimeter, it can acquire high-resolution stereo and multispectral imagery. ZY-3 04 will form an operational satellite network with the already operational ZY-3 02 and 03 satellites, primarily serving to meet the needs of large-scale stereo mapping production and updating basic geographic information products. It will provide high-precision data products for key natural resource operations such as geographic information resource construction, natural resource surveys and monitoring, land spatial planning and land use control, and natural resource supervision and enforcement.)			
20 December 2025; 12:30 [2025-64]	Long March 5	Y10	Wenchang LC-101	Successful
20 December 2025; 12:30 [2025-64]	Tongxin Jishu Shiyan Weixing 23 Hao 通信技术试验卫星二十三号 (Communications Technology Experimental Satellite No. 23)	Geostationary transfer	CNSA	Communications/Technology verification
20 December 2025; 12:30 [2025-64]	"通信技术试验卫星二十三号主要用于开展多频段、高速率卫星通信技术验证。" (The Communication Technology Test Satellite-23 is mainly used to verify multi-band, high-speed satellite communication technology.)			
23 December 2025; 02:00 [2025-65]	Long March 12A	Y1	Jiuquan	Successful
23 December 2025; 02:00 [2025-65]	Mass simulator	Low Earth	CMSA	Test mass
23 December 2025; 02:00 [2025-65]	Maiden flight of the CZ-12A. Orbital mission successful but initial attempt at first-stage recovery via landing failed.			
25 December 2025; 23:26 [2025-66]	Long March 8A	Y6	Wenchang Commercial Space Launch Site LC-1	Successful
25 December 2025; 23:26 [2025-66]	Weixing Huliangwang Digui 17 Zu 卫星互联网低轨17组 (Satellite internet low-orbit 17th group)	Low Earth	China Satellite Network Group Co., Ltd. (China SatNet)	Communications
25 December 2025; 23:26 [2025-66]	Seventeenth batch of satellites (9 satellites) for the "Guowang" broadband communications megaconstellation.			
26 December 2025; 16:07 [2025-67]	Long March 3B	Yxxx	Xichang LC-2	Successful
26 December 2025; 16:07 [2025-67]	Fengyun-4 Hao 03 Xing 风云四号03星 (Weather Satellite No. 4-03)	Geostationary transfer	China Meteorological Administration	Meteorological
26 December 2025; 16:07 [2025-67]	Satellite is part of a weather satellite network that is to be positioned at 133 degrees East longitude above the equator in the geostationary orbital belt.			
30 December 2025; 04:12 [2025-68]	Long March 4B	Y69	Jiuquan SLS-2	Successful
30 December 2025; 04:12 [2025-68]	Tianhui-7 天绘七号; Cosmic Pattern 7	Sun-synchronous	CNSA	Earth observation
30 December 2025; 04:12 [2025-68]	"天绘七号卫星主要用于地理信息测绘、国土资源普查和科学试验研究等任务。 " (The Tianhui-7 satellite is primarily used for tasks such as geographic information mapping, land resource surveys, and scientific research experiments.)			
30 December 2025; 22:40 [2025-69]	Long March 7A	Y7	Wenchang LC-201	Successful
30 December 2025; 22:40 [2025-69]	Shijian-29 Hao Weixing A Xing 实践二十九号卫星A星 (Practice No. 29 satellite A)	Geostationary transfer	CNSA	SSA/Technology verification
30 December 2025; 22:40 [2025-69]	Shijian-29 Hao Weixing B Xing 实践二十九号卫星B星 (Practice No. 29 satellite B)	Geostationary transfer	CNSA	SSA/Technology verification
30 December 2025; 22:40 [2025-69]	"实践二十九号卫星主要开展空间目标探测新技术验证试验。" (Shijian-29 satellite will primarily conduct verification experiments on new technologies for space target detection.)			

=== 2026 ===
Date/time (UTC)	Rocket	Serial number	Launch site	Outcome
Date/time (UTC)	Payload	Separation orbit	Operator	Function
Date/time (UTC)	Remarks			
13 January 2026; 14:16 [2026-1] (Note: Local code for 2026 CZ launches used only in the current table)	Long March 6A	Y27	Taiyuan LA-9A	Successful
13 January 2026; 14:16 [2026-1]	Yaogan 50 Hao 01 Xing 遥感五十号01星 (Remote Sensing No. 50-01)	Low Earth	CNSA	Earth observation
13 January 2026; 14:16 [2026-1]	"遥感五十号01星主要用于国土普查、农作物估产和防灾减灾等领域。" (The Yaogan-50 01 satellite is primarily used for land surveys, crop yield estimation, and disaster prevention and mitigation.) Satellite was injected into a retrograde (142 degrees) 704 × 944 km LEO orbit.			
13 January 2026; 15:25 [2026-2]	Long March 8A	Y7	Hainan Commercial Space Launch Site LC-1	Successful
13 January 2026; 15:25 [2026-2]	Weixing Huliangwang Digui 18 Zu 卫星互联网低轨18组 (Satellite internet low-orbit 18th group)	Low Earth	China Satellite Network Group Co., Ltd. (China SatNet)	Communications
13 January 2026; 15:25 [2026-2]	Eightteenth batch of satellites (9 satellites) for the "Guowang" broadband communications megaconstellation.			
15 January 2026; 4:01 [2026-3]	Long March 2C	Yxx	Jiuquan SLS-2	Successful
15 January 2026; 4:01 [2026-3]	Aerjiliya Yaogan-3 Hao Weixing A Xing 阿尔及利亚遥感三号卫星A星 (Algerian Remote Sensing Satellite No. 3A)	Sun-synchronous	Algeria	Earth observation
15 January 2026; 4:01 [2026-3]	"遥感三号卫星A星主要用于土地规划和防灾减灾领域。"(The Yaogan-3A satellite is primarily used in the fields of land-use planning and disaster prevention and mitigation.) Satellite is known as AlSat-3A in Algeria.			
16 January 2026; 16:55 [2026-4]	Long March 3B	Yxxx	Xichang LC-2	Failure
16 January 2026; 16:55 [2026-4]	Shijian 32 Hao Weixing 实践三十二号卫星 (Practice No. 32 Satellite)	Geostationary transfer	CNSA	unknown
16 January 2026; 16:55 [2026-4]	Launch failed due to third stage underperformance.			
19 January 2026; 7:48 [2026-5]	Long March 12	Y5	Hainan Commercial Space Launch Site LC-2	Successful
19 January 2026; 7:48 [2026-5]	Weixing Huliangwang Digui 19 Zu 卫星互联网低轨19组 (Satellite internet low-orbit 19th group)	Low Earth	China Satellite Network Group Co., Ltd. (China SatNet)	Communications
19 January 2026; 7:48 [2026-5]	Nineteenth batch of satellites (9 satellites) for the "Guowang" broadband communications megaconstellation.			
31 January 2026; 4:01 [2026-6]	Long March 2C	Yxx	Jiuquan SLS-2	Successful
31 January 2026; 4:01 [2026-6]	Aerjiliya Yaogan-3 Hao Weixing B Xing 阿尔及利亚遥感三号卫星B星 (Algerian Remote Sensing Satellite No. 3B)	Sun-synchronous	Algeria	Earth observation
31 January 2026; 4:01 [2026-6]	"阿尔及利亚遥感三号卫星B星主要用于土地规划和防灾减灾领域。"(The Yaogan-3B satellite is primarily used in the fields of land-use planning and disaster prevention and mitigation.) Satellite is known as AlSat-3B in Algeria. This launch is complimentary to the CZ-2C launch on 15 January 2026 which launched the AlSat-3A.			
7 February 2026; ~03:57 [2026-7]	Long March 2F	T6	Jiuquan SLS-1	Successful
7 February 2026; ~03:57 [2026-7]	Kěchóngfùshǐyòng shìyàn hángtiānqì 可重复使用试验航天器 (Reusable experimental spacecraft)	Low Earth	CASC	Technology verification
7 February 2026; ~03:57 [2026-7]	"试验航天器将按计划开展可重复使用试验航天器技术验证，为和平利用太空提供技术支撑。" (The experimental spacecraft will carry out planned technology verification tests for reusable spacecraft, providing technical support for the peaceful use of outer space.) Fourth flight of the reusable spaceplane.			
12 March 2026; 19:48 [2026-8]	Long March 8A	Y8	Hainan Commercial Space Launch Site LC-1	Successful
12 March 2026; 19:48 [2026-8]	Weixing Huliangwang Digui 20 Zu 卫星互联网低轨20组 (Satellite internet low-orbit 20th group)	Low Earth	China Satellite Network Group Co., Ltd. (China SatNet)	Communications
12 March 2026; 19:48 [2026-8]	20th batch of satellites (9 satellites) for the "Guowang" broadband communications megaconstellation.			
12 March 2026; 22:33 [2026-9]	Long March 2D	Yxx	Xichang LC-3	Successful
12 March 2026; 22:33 [2026-9]	Shiyan 30 Hao Weixing 03 Xing 试验三十号卫星03星 (Experimental Satellite No.30, 03)	Low Earth	CNSA	Earth observation
12 March 2026; 22:33 [2026-9]	Shiyan 30 Hao Weixing 04 Xing 试验三十号卫星04星 (Experimental Satellite No.30, 04)	Low Earth	CNSA	Earth observation
12 March 2026; 22:33 [2026-9]	"该卫星主要用于对地观测技术试验验证。"(These satellites are primarily used for testing and verifying Earth observation technologies.)			
15 March 2026; 13:22 [2026-10]	Long March 6A	Y28	Taiyuan LA-9A	Successful
15 March 2026; 13:22 [2026-10]	Yaogan 50 Hao 02 Xing 遥感五十号02星 (Remote Sensing No. 50-02)	Low Earth	CNSA	Earth observation
15 March 2026; 13:22 [2026-10]	"遥感五十号02星主要用于国土普查、农作物估产和防灾减灾等领域。 " (The Yaogan-50 02 satellite is primarily used for land surveys, crop yield estimation, and disaster prevention and mitigation.) Satellite is a companion to the Yaogan-50 01 satellite launched on 13 January 2026 and, similar to the previous spacecraft, was injected into a retrograde (142 degrees) orbit.			
25 March 2026; 22:51 [2026-11]	Long March 2D	Y105	Taiyuan	Successful
25 March 2026; 22:51 [2026-11]	Siwei Gaojing-2 05 四维高景二号05	Sun-synchronous	China Siwei	Earth observation
25 March 2026; 22:51 [2026-11]	Siwei Gaojing-2 06 四维高景二号06	Sun-synchronous	China Siwei	Earth observation
25 March 2026; 22:51 [2026-11]	Earth observation satellites (possibly carrying synthetic aperture radars).			
27 March 2026; 4:11 [2026-12]	Long March 2C + YZ-1S	Y-- + Y--	Jiuquan SLS-2	Successful
27 March 2026; 4:11 [2026-12]	Shiyan 33 Hao Weixing 试验三十三号卫星 (Experimental Satellite No. 33)	Sun-synchronous	CNSA	SSA
27 March 2026; 4:11 [2026-12]	"试验三十三号卫星主要用于空间环境探测科学试验。" (The Shiyan 33 Satellite is primarily used for scientific experiments involving the exploration of the space environment.)			
7 April 2026; 13:32 [2026-13]	Long March 8	Y7	Hainan Commercial Space Launch Site LC-1	Successful
7 April 2026; 13:32 [2026-13]	Qianfan Jigui 07 Zu 千帆极轨07组 (Thousand Sails Polar Orbit 07th group)	Polar	Shanghai Spacecom Satellite Technology	Communications
7 April 2026; 13:32 [2026-13]	Seventh batch of 18 satellites launched for the Qianfan megaconstellation.			
8 April 2026; 19:38 [2026-14]	Long March 6A	Y17	Taiyuan LA-9A	Successful
8 April 2026; 19:38 [2026-14]	Weixing Huliangwang Digui 21 Zu 卫星互联网低轨21组 (Satellite internet low-orbit 21st group)	Low Earth/Polar	China Satellite Network Group Co., Ltd. (China SatNet)	Communications
8 April 2026; 19:38 [2026-14]	21st batch of low-orbit satellites (5 satellites) for the "Guowang" broadband communications megaconstellation.			
17 April 2026; 4:10 [2026-15]	Long March 4C	Y41	Jiuquan SLS-2	Successful
17 April 2026; 4:10 [2026-15]	Gaojingdu Wenshi Qiti Zonghe Tance Weixing 高精度温室气体综合探测卫星; High-Precision Comprehensive Greenhouse Gas Detection Satellite	Sun-synchronous	CNSA	Earth observation
17 April 2026; 4:10 [2026-15]	Satellite is designed to assist atmospheric and climate sciences related research.			
24 April 2026; 6:35 [2026-16]	Long March 2D	Y109	Xichang LC-3	Successful
24 April 2026; 6:35 [2026-16]	Weixing Hulianwang Jishu Shiyan 09 (01) 卫星互联网技术试验09 (01)	Low Earth	CNSA	Communications/Technology verification
24 April 2026; 6:35 [2026-16]	Weixing Hulianwang Jishu Shiyan 09 (02) 卫星互联网技术试验09 (02)	Low Earth	CNSA	Communications/Technology verification
24 April 2026; 6:35 [2026-16]	Weixing Hulianwang Jishu Shiyan 09 (03) 卫星互联网技术试验09 (03)	Low Earth	CNSA	Communications/Technology verification
24 April 2026; 6:35 [2026-16]	Weixing Hulianwang Jishu Shiyan 09 (04) 卫星互联网技术试验09 (04)	Low Earth	CNSA	Communications/Technology verification
24 April 2026; 6:35 [2026-16]	"卫星互联网技术试验卫星主要用于开展手机宽带直连卫星、天地网络融合等技术试验验证。" (The satellite internet technology test satellite will primarily be used for testing and verifying technologies such as direct broadband connection to satellite for mobile phones and the integration of space and ground networks.)			
25 April 2026; 12:15 [2026-17]	Long March 6	Y15	Taiyuan LA-9A	Successful
25 April 2026; 12:15 [2026-17]	PRSC-EO3	Low Earth	SUPARCO	Earth observation
25 April 2026; 12:15 [2026-17]	Pakistani satellite built by SUPARCO.			
11 May 2026; 00:14 [2026-18]	Long March 7	Y11	Wenchang, LC-201	Successful
11 May 2026; 00:14 [2026-18]	Tianzhou 10 天舟十号	Low Earth (TSS)	CNSA	Space logistics
11 May 2026; 00:14 [2026-18]	Ninth cargo flight to the CSS.			
12 May 2026; 11:59 [2026-19]	Long March 6A	Y23	Taiyuan LA-9A	Successful
12 May 2026; 11:59 [2026-19]	Qianfan Jigui 09 Zu 千帆极轨09组 (Thousand Sails Polar Orbit 09th group)	Polar	Shanghai Spacecom Satellite Technology	Communications
12 May 2026; 11:59 [2026-19]	Eighth batch of 18 satellites launched for the Qianfan megaconstellation.			
17 May 2026; 14:42 [2026-20]	Long March 8	Y8	Hainan Commercial Space Launch Site LC-1	Successful
17 May 2026; 14:42 [2026-20]	Qianfan Xingzuo Di 9 Pizu Wangweixing 千帆星座第9批组网卫星 (Thousand Sails Constellation 9th group internet satellites)	Polar	Shanghai Spacecom Satellite Technology	Communications
17 May 2026; 14:42 [2026-20]	Ninth batch of 18 satellites launched for the Qianfan megaconstellation.			
24 May 2026; 15:08:36 [2026-21]	Long March 2F	Y23	Jiuquan SLS-1	Successful
24 May 2026; 15:08:36 [2026-21]	Shenzhou 23	Low Earth (TSS)	CMSA	Crewed spaceflight
24 May 2026; 15:08:36 [2026-21]	11th crewed flight to the Tiangong space station, seventeenth Chinese crewed space flight overall.			
26 May 2026; 16:16 [2026-22]	Long March 7A	Y12	Wenchang LC-201	Successful
26 May 2026; 16:16 [2026-22]	Tongxin Jishu Shiyan Weixing 24 Hao 通信技术试验卫星二十四号 (Communication Technology Experiment Satellite number 24)	Geostationary transfer	CNSA	Communications/Technology verification
26 May 2026; 16:16 [2026-22]	"通信技术试验卫星二十四号主要用于开展多频段、高速率卫星通信技术验证。" (The Communication Technology Experiment Satellite number 24 is primarily used to verify multi-band, high-speed satellite communication technologies.)			
30 May 2026; 18:07 [2026-23]	Long March 2D	Y119	Xichang LC-3	Successful
30 May 2026; 18:07 [2026-23]	Weixing Hulianwang Jishu Shiyan Weixing 卫星互联网技术试验卫星; Satellite internet technology test satellite	LEO	CNSA	Communications/Technology verification
30 May 2026; 18:07 [2026-23]	"卫星互联网技术试验卫星主要用于开展手机宽带直连卫星、天地网络融合等技术试验验证。" (The satellite internet technology test satellite will primarily be used to conduct experiments and verifications of technologies such as direct satellite broadband connections for mobile phones and the integration of space and ground networks.)			
1 June 2026; 08:40 [2026-24]	Long March 12B	Y1	Jiuquan	Successful
1 June 2026; 08:40 [2026-24]	Qianfan Jigui 08 Zu Weixing 千帆极轨08组卫星 (Thousand Sails polar group 08 satellites)	Polar	Shanghai Spacecom Satellite Technology	Communications
1 June 2026; 08:40 [2026-24]	Maiden flight of the CZ-12B. First stage recovery not attempted. Two satellites for the Qianfan constellation.			
4 June 2026; 11:39 [2026-25]	Long March 6A	Y25	Taiyuan LA-9A	Successful
4 June 2026; 11:39 [2026-25]	Qianfan Jigui 11 Zu 千帆极轨11组 (Thousand Sails Polar Orbit 11th group)	Polar	Shanghai Spacecom Satellite Technology	Communications
4 June 2026; 11:39 [2026-25]	Eleventh batch (18 satellites) launched for the Qianfan megaconstellation.			
5 June 2026; 6:34 [2026-26]	Long March 8	Y9	Hainan Commercial Space Launch Site LC-1	Successful
5 June 2026; 6:34 [2026-26]	Qianfan Jigui 12 Zu Weixing 千帆极轨12组卫星 (Thousand Sails Polar Orbit 12th group satellites)	Polar	Shanghai Spacecom Satellite Technology	Communications
5 June 2026; 6:34 [2026-26]	Twelfth batch (18 satellites) launched for the Qianfan megaconstellation.			
11 June 2026; 7:30 [2026-27]	Long March 5	Y11	Wenchang LC-101	Successful
11 June 2026; 7:30 [2026-27]	Tongxin Jishu Shiyan Weixing 25 Hao 通信技术试验卫星二十五号 (Communications Technology Experimental Satellite No. 25)	Geostationary transfer	CNSA	Communications/Technology verification
11 June 2026; 7:30 [2026-27]	"通信技术试验卫星二十五号主要用于开展多频段、高速率卫星通信技术验证。" (This satellite is primarily used to verify multi-band, high-speed satellite communication technologies.)			
16 June 2026; 9:45 [2026-28]	Long March 3B	Yxx	Xichang LC-2	Successful
16 June 2026; 9:45 [2026-28]	Shijian-31 实践三十一号 (CExperimental Satellite No. 33)	Molniya	CNSA	SSA
16 June 2026; 9:45 [2026-28]	"实践三十一号卫星主要用于空间环境探测。" (The Shijian-31 satellite is primarily used for space environment exploration.)			
17 June 2026; 2:44 [2026-29]	Long March 12	Y7	Hainan Commercial Space Launch Site LC-2	Successful
17 June 2026; 2:44 [2026-29]	Weixing Huliangwang Digui 22 Zu 卫星互联网低轨22组 (Satellite internet low-orbit 22nd group)	Low Earth	China Satellite Network Group Co., Ltd. (China SatNet)	Communications
17 June 2026; 2:44 [2026-29]	22nd batch of satellites (9 satellites) for the "Guowang" broadband communications megaconstellation.			
23 June 2026; 2:10 [2026-30]	Long March 7A	Y20	Wenchang LC-201	Successful
23 June 2026; 2:10 [2026-30]	Tongxin Jishu Shiyan Weixing 26 Hao A Xing 通信技术试验卫星二十六号A星 (Communications Technology Experimental Satellite No. 26A)	Geostationary transfer	CNSA	Communications/Technology verification
23 June 2026; 2:10 [2026-30]	"通信技术试验卫星二十六号A星主要用于卫星通信、广播电视、数据传输等业务，并开展相关技术试验验证。" (The Communication Technology Experimental Satellite-26A is primarily used for services such as satellite communications, radio and television broadcasting, and data transmission, as well as for conducting relevant technical tests and verification.)			
1 July 2026; 23:46 [2026-31]	Long March 4B	Yxx	Jiuquan SLS-2	Successful
1 July 2026; 23:46 [2026-31]	Haiyang 2E 海洋二号E; Ocean Number 2E	Sun-synchronous	CNSA	Earth observation
1 July 2026; 23:46 [2026-31]	Spacecraft carries synthetic apeture radar altimeter (wide-swath capability), multi-beam atomspheric correction mircowave radiometer, and the DORIS instrument provided by CNES/Thales.			
4 July 2026; 9:30 [2026-32]	Long March 6A	Yxx	Taiyuan LA-9A	Successful
4 July 2026; 9:30 [2026-32]	Qianfan Jigui 13 Zu Weixing 千帆极轨13组卫星 (Thousand Sails Polar Orbit group 13 satellites)	Polar	Shanghai Spacecom Satellite Technology	Communications
4 July 2026; 9:30 [2026-32]	Thirteenth batch (18 satellites) launched for the Qianfan megaconstellation.			
5 July 2026; 13:43 [2026-33]	Long March 8A	Y9	Hainan Commercial Space Launch Site LC-1	Successful
5 July 2026; 13:43 [2026-33]	Qianfan Jigui 15 Zu Weixing 千帆极轨15组卫星 (Thousand Sails Polar Orbit group 15 satellites)	Polar	Shanghai Spacecom Satellite Technology	Communications
5 July 2026; 13:43 [2026-33]	Fourteenth batch (20 satellites) launched for the Qianfan megaconstellation.			
10 July 2026; 4:15 [2026-34]	Long March 10B	Y1/X1.1 (Note: The "Xa.b" notation denotes the b'th launch of a reusable 1st-stage with ID Xa.)	Hainan Commercial Space Launch Site LC-2	Successful; Successful 1st-stage recovery: (via "Ling Hang Zhe")
10 July 2026; 4:15 [2026-34]	Xing Wang "Xin Xing Ji Hua" CX-26 星网 “新星计划” CX-26 (SatNet "New Star Project" CX-26)	LEO	China Satellite Network Group Co., Ltd. (China SatNet)	Communications/Technology verification
10 July 2026; 4:15 [2026-34]	First launch of the Long March 10B and the Long March 10 family of rockets. First attempt to recover a Long March 10 series rocket first-stage during an orbital launch. First stage recovery was successful making China the second nation to achieve a 1st-stage land/ship landing during an orbital launch.			
23 July 2026; 12:00 [2026-35]	Long March 3B	Yxx	Xichang LC-2	Successful
23 July 2026; 12:00 [2026-35]	Tianlian 2-06 天链二号06星 (Cosmic Chain No. 2-06 Satellite)	Geostationary transfer	CNSA	Communications
23 July 2026; 12:00 [2026-35]	"天链二号06星主要用于为飞船、空间站等载人航天器提供数据中继和测控服务，为中、低轨道资源卫星提供数据中继和测控服务，为航天器发射提供测控支持。" (The Tianlian 2-06 satellite is primarily used to provide data relay and telemetry, tracking, and command (TT&C) services for manned spacecraft—such as spaceships and space stations—as well as for medium- and low-orbit Earth observation satellites, and to provide TT&C support for spacecraft launches.)			
29 July 2026; 11:50 [2026-36]	Long March 7A	Y29	Wenchang LC-201	Successful
29 July 2026; 11:50 [2026-36]	Tianlian 3-01 天链三号01星 (Cosmic Chain No. 3-01 Satellite)	Geostationary transfer	CNSA	Communications
29 July 2026; 11:50 [2026-36]	"天链三号01星主要用于为飞船、空间实验室、空间站等载人航天器提供数据中继和测控服务，为中、低轨道资源卫星提供数据中继和测控服务。" (The Tianlian-3 01 satellite is primarily used to provide data relay, tracking, and control services for manned spacecraft—such as spaceships, space laboratories, and space stations—as well as for medium- and low-orbit Earth observation satellites.)			
30 July 2026; 1:00 [2026-37]	Long March 6A	Y18	Taiyuan LA-9A	Successful
30 July 2026; 1:00 [2026-37]	Tongxin Jishu Shiyan Weixing 27 Hao A/B Xing 通信技术试验卫星二十七号A/B星; Communications Technology Experimental Satellite No. 27-A/B)	Low Earth	CNSA	Communications/Technology verification
30 July 2026; 1:00 [2026-37]	"通信技术试验卫星二十七号A/B星主要用于卫星通信、广播电视、数据传输等业务，并开展相关技术试验验证。"(The TJS 27-A/B will primarily be used for satellite communication, broadcasting, data transmission, and related technology testing and verification.)			
4 August 2026; 8:52 [2026-38]	Long March 8A	Y10	Hainan Commercial Space Launch Site LC-1	Successful
4 August 2026; 8:52 [2026-38]	Weixing Huliangwang Digui 23 Zu 卫星互联网低轨23组 (Satellite internet low-orbit 23rd group)	Low Earth	China Satellite Network Group Co., Ltd. (China SatNet)	Communications
4 August 2026; 8:52 [2026-38]	23rd batch of satellites (9 satellites) for the "Guowang" broadband communications megaconstellation.			
10 August 2026; 12:02 [2026-39]	Long March 7A	Y16	Wenchang LC-201	Failure
10 August 2026; 12:02 [2026-39]	Zhongxing 4B 中星4B (Chinasat-4B)	Geostationary transfer	CNSA	Communications
10 August 2026; 12:02 [2026-39]	Apparent structural breakup of inter-stage between the second and third stages, followed by a smaller explosive event in the second stage, followed by the apparent activation of the vehicle's Flight Termination System which destroyed the rocket. Debris fell into the South China Sea. These events occurred about 80 seconds after liftoff when the rocket was near the "Max-Q" flight regime. Cause of failure is under investigation.			
16 August 2026; 4:10 [2026-40]	Long March 12	Y8	Hainan Commercial Space Launch Site LC-2	Successful
16 August 2026; 4:10 [2026-40]	Weixing Huliangwang Digui 24 Zu 卫星互联网低轨24组 (Satellite internet low-orbit 24th group)	Low Earth	China Satellite Network Group Co., Ltd. (China SatNet)	Communications
16 August 2026; 4:10 [2026-40]	24th batch of satellites (9 satellites) for the "Guowang" broadband communications megaconstellation.			
17 August 2026; 3:02 [2026-41]	Long March 2C	Y68	Taiyuan	Successful
17 August 2026; 3:02 [2026-41]	SEO Weixing; SEO 卫星 (SEO Satellite)	Sun-synchronous	National Space Science and Technology Center at the United Arab Emirates University; UAE Space Agency	Earth observation/Technology verification
17 August 2026; 3:02 [2026-41]	Payload is the Satellite for Earth Observation for the United Arab Emirates.			
25 August 2026; 03:21 [2026-42]	Long March 6C	Y1	Taiyuan LA-9A	Successful
25 August 2026; 03:21 [2026-42]	Zhongke Weixing 14 Xing 中科卫星14星 (China Academy of Science satellite 14)	Sun-synchronous	China Academy of Science	Earth observation
25 August 2026; 03:21 [2026-42]	Zhongke Weixing 15 Xing 中科卫星15星 (China Academy of Science satellite 15)	Sun-synchronous	China Academy of Science	Earth observation
25 August 2026; 03:21 [2026-42]	Muduo 1A Weixing 木铎1A卫星 (Wooden Bell 1A Satellite)	Sun-synchronous	Beijing Normal University	Earth observation
25 August 2026; 03:21 [2026-42]	Muduo 1B Weixing 木铎1B卫星 (Wooden Bell 1B Satellite)	Sun-synchronous	Beijing Normal University	Earth observation
25 August 2026; 03:21 [2026-42]	Jian'an Meng Xiang Xing 静安梦想星 (Jian'an Dream Satellite)	Sun-synchronous	Youth Activity Center of 静安 (Jian'an) District, Shanghai, China	Amateur radio
25 August 2026; 03:21 [2026-42]	Bayi 04 Xing 八一04星 (August First 04 Satellite)	Sun-synchronous	Harbin Institute of Technology	Amateur radio
25 August 2026; 03:21 [2026-42]	Yinhe Hangtian Lingtzi 09 Taiguo Lifang Xing 银河航天灵知09泰国立方星 (GalaxySpace Gnosis 09 Thailand Cube Satellite AKA GISTDA Cubesat 1)	Sun-synchronous	GISTDA	Earth observation
25 August 2026; 03:21 [2026-42]	This flight is designated "Y1" even though it's the second flight of the CZ-6C carrier rocket. Payloads include student amateur radio experiments and a remote-sensing and education cubesat for Thailand's GISTDA			
10 September 2026; 9:00 [2026-43]	Long March 4B	Yxx	Jiuquan SLS-2	Successful
10 September 2026; 9:00 [2026-43]	Yaogan 53 Hao 01-03 Xing 遥感五十三号01-03星 (Remote Sensing No. 53 01-03 satellites)	Low Earth	CNSA	Earth observation
10 September 2026; 9:00 [2026-43]	Yaogan 56 Hao 01-03 Xing 遥感五十六号01-03星 (Remote Sensing No. 56 01-03 satellites)	Low Earth	CNSA	Earth observation
10 September 2026; 9:00 [2026-43]	"遥感五十三号01-03星、遥感五十六号01-03星主要用于科学试验、国土资源普查、农产品估产和防灾减灾等领域。" (The Yaogan-53 (01-03) and Yaogan-56 (01-03) satellites are primarily used for scientific experiments, land resource surveys, agricultural yield estimation, and disaster prevention and mitigation.)			
17 September 2026; 0:32 [2026-44]	Long March 12	Y9	Hainan Commercial Space Launch Site LC-2	Successful
17 September 2026; 0:32 [2026-44]	Weixing Huliangwang Digui 25 Zu 卫星互联网低轨25组 (Satellite internet low-orbit 25th group)	Low Earth	China Satellite Network Group Co., Ltd. (China SatNet)	Communications
17 September 2026; 0:32 [2026-44]	25th batch of satellites (9 satellites) for the "Guowang" broadband communications megaconstellation.			
19 September 2026; 10:50 [2026-45]	Long March 2D	Y104	Taiyuan	Successful
19 September 2026; 10:50 [2026-45]	ZhuZhou TaiKong XingXi 13 株洲太空星际 13 (PIESAT-2 13)	Sun-synchronous	Zhuzhou Space Interstellar Satellite Technology Co., Ltd.	Earth observation/SAR
19 September 2026; 10:50 [2026-45]	ZhuZhou TaiKong XingXi 14 株洲太空星际 14 (PIESAT-2 14)	Sun-synchronous	Zhuzhou Space Interstellar Satellite Technology Co., Ltd.	Earth observation/SAR
19 September 2026; 10:50 [2026-45]	ZhuZhou TaiKong XingXi 15 株洲太空星际 15 (PIESAT-2 15)	Sun-synchronous	Zhuzhou Space Interstellar Satellite Technology Co., Ltd.	Earth observation/SAR
19 September 2026; 10:50 [2026-45]	ZhuZhou TaiKong XingXi 16 株洲太空星际 16 (PIESAT-2 16)	Sun-synchronous	Zhuzhou Space Interstellar Satellite Technology Co., Ltd.	Earth observation/SAR
19 September 2026; 10:50 [2026-45]	PIESAT-2 is a planned 16-satellites constellation of X-band radar satellites for SAR imaging. See 9 November 2024 CZ-2C launch (4 satellites) and 16 December 2024 CZ-2D launch (4 satellites).			
23 September 2026; 13:32 [2026-46]	Long March 8A	Y11	Hainan Commercial Space Launch Site LC-1	Successful
23 September 2026; 13:32 [2026-46]	Weixing Huliangwang Digui 26 Zu 卫星互联网低轨26组 (Satellite internet low-orbit 26th group)	Low Earth	China Satellite Network Group Co., Ltd. (China SatNet)	Communications
23 September 2026; 13:32 [2026-46]	26th batch of satellites (9 satellites) for the "Guowang" broadband communications megaconstellation.			
24 September 2026; 8:46 [2026-47]	Long March 6A	Y13	Taiyuan LA-9A	Successful
24 September 2026; 8:46 [2026-47]	Yaogan 40 group 04-01 遥感四十号04组 01 (Remote Sensing No. 40 Group 04-01)	Sun-synchronous	CNSA	ELINT/Technology verification
24 September 2026; 8:46 [2026-47]	Yaogan 40 group 04-02 遥感四十号04组 02 (Remote Sensing No. 40 Group 04-02)	Sun-synchronous	CNSA	ELINT/Technology verification
24 September 2026; 8:46 [2026-47]	Yaogan 40 group 04-03 遥感四十号04组 03 (Remote Sensing No. 40 Group 04-03)	Sun-synchronous	CNSA	ELINT/Technology verification
24 September 2026; 8:46 [2026-47]	"遥感四十号04组卫星主要用于开展电磁环境探测及相关技术试验。 " (The Yaogan-40 04 group of satellites will mainly be used for electromagnetic environment detection and related technology experiments.)			
9 October 2026; 19:27 [2026-48]	Long March 12	Y10	Hainan Commercial Space Launch Site LC-2	Successful
9 October 2026; 19:27 [2026-48]	Weixing Huliangwang Digui 27 Zu 卫星互联网低轨27组 (Satellite internet low-orbit 27th group)	Low Earth	China Satellite Network Group Co., Ltd. (China SatNet)	Communications
9 October 2026; 19:27 [2026-48]	27th batch of satellites (9 satellites) for the "Guowang" broadband communications megaconstellation.			
23 October 2026; 10:15 [2026-49]	Long March 6A	Y30	Taiyuan LA-9A	Successful
23 October 2026; 10:15 [2026-49]	Yaogan 50 Hao 03 Xing 遥感五十号03星 (Remote Sensing No. 50-03)	Low-Earth	CNSA	Earth observation
23 October 2026; 10:15 [2026-49]	"遥感五十号03星主要用于国土普查、农作物估产和防灾减灾等领域。" (The Remote Sensing No. 50-03 satellite is primarily intended for use in land resource surveys, crop yield estimation, and disaster prevention and mitigation.)			
23 October 2026; 19:25 [2026-50]	Long March 4B	Y81	Jiuquan SLS-2	Successful
23 October 2026; 19:25 [2026-50]	Yaogan 53 Hao 07-09 Xing 遥感五十三号07-09星 (Remote Sensing No. 53 satellites 07-09)	Low Earth	CNSA	Earth observation
23 October 2026; 19:25 [2026-50]	Yaogan 56 Hao 19-21 Xing 遥感五十六号19-21星 (Remote Sensing No. 56 satellites 19-21)	Low Earth	CNSA	Earth observation
23 October 2026; 19:25 [2026-50]	"遥感五十三号07-09星、遥感五十六号19-21星主要用于科学试验、国土资源普查、农产品估产和防灾减灾等领域。" (The Yaogan-53 07–09 and Yaogan-56 19–21 satellites are primarily intended for use in scientific experiments, land resource surveys, agricultural yield estimation, and disaster prevention and mitigation.)			
25 October 2026; 02:03 [2026-51]	Long March 8A	Y12	Hainan Commercial Space Launch Site LC-1	Successful
25 October 2026; 02:03 [2026-51]	Weixing Huliangwang Digui 28 Zu 卫星互联网低轨28组 (Satellite internet low-orbit 28th group)	Low Earth	China Satellite Network Group Co., Ltd. (China SatNet)	Communications
25 October 2026; 02:03 [2026-51]	28th batch of satellites (9 satellites) for the "Guowang" broadband communications megaconstellation.			
5 November 2026; 15:58 [2026-52]	Long March 2C	Y84	Xichang LC-3	Successful
5 November 2026; 15:58 [2026-52]	Yaogan 51 Hao 07 Xing 遥感五十一号07星 (Remote Sensing No. 51-07 satellite)	Low Earth	CNSA	Earth observation
5 November 2026; 15:58 [2026-52]	Yaogan 51 Hao 08 Xing 遥感五十一号08星 (Remote Sensing No. 51-08 satellite)	Low Earth	CNSA	Earth observation
5 November 2026; 15:58 [2026-52]	Yaogan 51 Hao 09 Xing 遥感五十一号09星 (Remote Sensing No. 51-09 satellite)	Low Earth	CNSA	Earth observation
5 November 2026; 15:58 [2026-52]	"遥感五十一号07-09星主要用于科学试验、电磁环境探测等领域。"(Remote Sensing No. 51 07-09 satellites are primarily intended for scientific experiments, electromagnetic environment detection, and other related fields.)			
8 November 2026; 20:24 [2026-53]	Long March 12	Y11	Hainan Commercial Space Launch Site LC-2	Successful
8 November 2026; 20:24 [2026-53]	Weixing Huliangwang Digui 29 Zu 卫星互联网低轨29组 (Satellite internet low-orbit 29th group)	Low Earth	China Satellite Network Group Co., Ltd. (China SatNet)	Communications
8 November 2026; 20:24 [2026-53]	29th batch of satellites (9 satellites) for the "Guowang" broadband communications megaconstellation.			
11 November 2026; 11:40 [2026-54]	Long March 2D	Y108	Jiuquan SLS-2	Successful
11 November 2026; 11:40 [2026-54]	Tanyuan Jihua Tanluzhe Weixing 探源计划探路者卫星 ("Quest for Origins" Pathfinder Satellite)	Polar	Chinese Academy of Sciences	Technology verification
11 November 2026; 11:40 [2026-54]	The Pathfinder satellite will perform on-orbit validation of critical technologies for four follow-on scientific satellites (all to be launched prior to 2031) belonging to the Chinese Academy of Sciences. The main payload on the Pathfinder satellite is the Very Large Area Gamma-ray Space Telescope Pathfinder (VLAST-P); other payloads consist of various instruments for probing magnetospehric and upper atmospheric phenomena. There are also three subsatellites that will be released later in orbit; these will fly in formation to conduct low frequency radio astronomy interferometry.			
18 November 2026; 22:51 [2026-55]	Long March 2D	Y106	Taiyuan	Successful
18 November 2026; 22:51 [2026-55]	Shijian 24 Hao Weixing 实践二十四号卫星 (Practice No. 24 Satellite)	Sun-synchronous	CNSA	Earth observation/SAR(?)
20 November 2026; 11:59 [2026-56]	Long March 8A	Y13	Hainan Commercial Space Launch Site LC-1	Successful
20 November 2026; 11:59 [2026-56]	Weixing Huliangwang Digui 30 Zu 卫星互联网低轨30组 (Satellite internet low-orbit 30th group)	Low Earth	China Satellite Network Group Co., Ltd. (China SatNet)	Communications
20 November 2026; 11:59 [2026-56]	30th batch of satellites (9 satellites) for the "Guowang" broadband communications megaconstellation.			

== Notable Future launches ==
=== 2027 ===
Date/time (UTC)	Rocket	Serial number	Launch site	Outcome
Date/time (UTC)	Payload	Separation orbit	Operator	Function
Date/time (UTC)	Remarks			
Q1 2027 (TBD)	Long March 5		Wenchang LC-1	
Q1 2027 (TBD)	Chang'e 7	Selenocentric	CNSA	Lunar lander
H1 2027	Long March 5B		Wenchang LC-1	
H1 2027	Xuntian	Low Earth	CNSA	Space telescope
H1 2027	Space telescope planned to co-orbit with the Tiangong space station.			
2027 (TBD)	Long March 3B			
2027 (TBD)	Asteroid impacter	Heliocentric	CNSA	Asteroid redirect test
2027 (TBD)	Asteroid orbiter	Heliocentric	CNSA	Asteroid flyby
2027 (TBD)	Planetary defense mission headed for the 2019 VL5 asteroid.			

=== 2028 ===
Date/time (UTC)	Rocket	Serial number	Launch site	Outcome
Date/time (UTC)	Payload	Separation orbit	Operator	Function
Date/time (UTC)	Remarks			
2028 (TBD)	Long March 5		Wenchang LC-1	
2028 (TBD)	Chang'e 8	Selenocentric	CNSA	Lunar lander

=== 2029 ===
Date/time (UTC)	Rocket	Serial number	Launch site	Outcome
Date/time (UTC)	Payload	Separation orbit	Operator	Function
Date/time (UTC)	Remarks			
September (TBD)	Long March 5		Wenchang LC-1	
September (TBD)	Tianwen-4 Jupiter orbiter	Jovicentric	CNSA	Jupiter orbiter
September (TBD)	Tianwen-4 Uranus flyby probe	Heliocentric	CNSA	Uranus flyby

== Sources ==
- McDowell, Jonathan. "Launch Log". Jonathan's Space Page.
- McDowell, Jonathan. "Satellite Catalog". Jonathan's Space Page.
- Krebs, Gunter. "DF-5 family".
