= Guowang =

Chinese satellite internet constellation

Guowang (Chinese: 国网; pinyin: Guówǎng; lit. 'national network'), officially Satellite Internet Series Satellites (Chinese: 卫星互联网系列卫星; pinyin: Wèixīng hùliánwǎng xìliè wèixīng) is a Chinese low-Earth orbit satellite internet constellation to create a system of worldwide internet coverage. It was created by China Aerospace Science and Industry Corporation (CASIC), a state-owned enterprise backed by the Chinese Academy of Space Technology (CAST). The project was started in 2022 as a rival to the Starlink satellite constellation installed by SpaceX, and plans to be constituted of over 13,000 satellites by the project's end.

Around 6,000 of the planned satellites are expected to orbit between 500 and 600 km, comparable to Starlink, and around 7,000 in a higher orbit at around 1,145 km.

All of the satellites launched so far have been placed in the higher orbits, in 2 shells, one with inclination of 86.5° at 1.175 km and a second with 50.0° inclination at 1.156 km. The high inclination (86.5°) shell is being launched with the Long March 5B and LM 6A rockets and contains heavier (~1000kg) satellites, while the lower inclination (50.0°) shell is launched by the Long March 8A and LM 12 rockets and contains a different, lighter (~700kg) satellite type.

As of September 2026, the program has launched 27 experimental series (技术试验系列; jìshù shìyàn xìliè) satellites, 3 high Earth orbit satellites (高轨; gāoguǐ) and 204 low Earth orbit (低轨; dīguǐ) satellites. The megaconstellation is managed by China SatNet and is believed to have both civilian and military applications.

== Satellite launch statistics ==
=== Operational LEO satellites launched ===
- Launch failure
- Launch success
- Planned

=== Other related satellites launched ===
- Launch failure
- Launch success
- Planned

== List of launches ==
=== Operational LEO satellites ===
Name & group of satellites	Number of satellites	Launch (UTC)	Orbit	Mean altitude	Inclination	Launch site	Launcher	Status
Hulianwang 1–10 (SatNet LEO Group 01)	10	16 December 2024; 10:00	Polar	1,175 km	86.5°	WSLS LC-1	Long March 5B / YZ-2; Y6	Success
Hulianwang 11–19 (SatNet LEO Group 02)	9	11 February 2025 09:30	LEO	1,156 km	50.0°	WSLS LC-2	Long March 8A; Y1	Success
Hulianwang 20–29 (SatNet LEO Group 03)	10	28 April 2025; 20:10	Polar	1,175 km	86.5°	WSLS LC-1	Long March 5B / YZ-2; Y7	Success
Hulianwang 30–34 (SatNet LEO Group 04)	5	6 June 2025; 20:45	Polar	1,175 km	86.5°	Taiyuan LA-9A	Long March 6A; Y8	Success
Hulianwang 35–39 (SatNet LEO Group 05)	5	27 July 2025; 10:04	Polar	1,175 km	86.5°	Taiyuan LA-9A	Long March 6A; Y14	Success
Hulianwang 40–48 (SatNet LEO Group 06)	9	30 July 2025; 07:49	LEO	1,156 km	50.0°	WCSLS LC-1	Long March 8A; Y3	Success
Hulianwang 49–57 (SatNet LEO Group 07)	9	4 August 2025; 10:21	LEO	1,156 km	50.0°	WCSLS LC-2	Long March 12; Y2	Success
Hulianwang 58–67 (SatNet LEO Group 08)	10	13 August 2025; 06:00	Polar	1,175 km	86.5°	WSLS LC-1	Long March 5B / YZ-2; Y8	Success
Hulianwang 68–72 (SatNet LEO Group 09)	5	17 August 2025; 14:15	Polar	1,175 km	86.5°	Taiyuan LA-9A	Long March 6A; Y10	Success
Hulianwang 73–81 (SatNet LEO Group 10)	9	25 August 2025; 19:08	LEO	1,156 km	50.0°	WCSLS LC-1	Long March 8A; Y2	Success
Hulianwang 82–86 (SatNet LEO Group 11)	5	27 September 2025	Polar	1,175 km	86.5°	Taiyuan LA-9A	Long March 6A; Y16	Success
Hulianwang 87–95 (SatNet LEO Group 12)	9	16 October 2025; 01:30	LEO	1,156 km	50.0°	WCSLS LC-1	Long March 8A Y4	Success
Hulianwang 96–104 (SatNet LEO Group 13)	9	10 November 2025; 02:41	LEO	1,156 km	50.0°	WCSLS LC-2	Long March 12 Y3	Success
Hulianwang 105–113 (SatNet LEO Group 14)	9	6 December 2025; 07:53	LEO	1,156 km	50.0°	WCSLS LC-1	Long March 8A Y5	Success
Hulianwang 114–118 (SatNet LEO Group 15)	5	8 December 2025; 10:11	Polar	1,175 km	86.5°	TSLC LC-9A	Long March 6A	Success
Hulianwang 119–127 (SatNet LEO Group 16)	9	11 December 2025; 23:00	LEO	1,156 km	50.0°	WCSLS LC-2	Long March 12 Y4	Success
Hulianwang 128–136 (SatNet LEO Group 17)	9	25 December 2025; 23:26	LEO	1,156 km	50.0°	WCSLS LC-1	Long March 8A Y6	Success
Hulianwang 137–145 (SatNet LEO Group 18)	9	13 January 2026; 15:25	LEO	1,156 km	50.0°	WCSLS LC-1	Long March 8A Y7	Success
Hulianwang 146–154 (SatNet LEO Group 19)	9	19 January 2026; 07:48	LEO	1,156 km	50.0°	WCSLS LC-2	Long March 12 Y5	Success
Hulianwang 155–163 (SatNet LEO Group 20)	9	12 March 2026; 19:48	LEO	1,156 km	50.0°	WCSLS LC-1	Long March 8A Y8	Success
Hulianwang 164–168 (SatNet LEO Group 21)	5	8 April 2026; 19:39	Polar	1,135 km	86.5°	TSLC LA-9A	Long March 6A; Y17	Success
Hulianwang 169–177 (SatNet LEO Group 22)	9	17 June 2026; 02:44	LEO		50.0°	WCSLS LC-2	Long March 12 Y7	Success
Hulianwang 178–186 (SatNet LEO Group 23)	9	4 August 2026; 08:52	LEO		50.0°	WCSLS LC-1	Long March 8A Y10	Success
Hulianwang 187-195 (SatNet LEO Group 24)	9	16 August 2026; 21:00	LEO		50.0°	WCSLS LC-2	Long March 12 Y8	Success
Hulianwang 196-204 (SatNet LEO Group 25)	9	17 September 2026; 08:32	LEO		50.0°	WCSLS LC-2	Long March 12 Y9	Success
Hulianwang 205-213 (SatNet LEO Group 26)	9	23 September 2026; 08:32	LEO		50.0°	WCSLS LC-1	Long March 8 Y11	Success
Hulianwang 214-222 (SatNet LEO Group 27)	9	9 October 2026; 08:32	LEO		50.0°	WCSLS LC-2	Long March 12 Y10	Success
Hulianwang 223–231 (SatNet LEO Group 28)	9	25 October 2026; 02:03 UTC	LEO		50.0°	WCSLS LC-1	Long March 8A	Success
Hulianwang 232–240 (SatNet LEO Group 29)	9	8 November 2026; 20:24 UTC	LEO		50.0°	WCSLS LC-2	Long March 12 Y11	Success
Hulianwang 241–249 (SatNet LEO Group 30)	9	20 November 2026; 11:59 UTC	LEO		50.0°	WCSLS LC-1	Long March 8A	Success

=== Other related launches ===
Name	Number of Satellites	Launch (UTC)	Orbit	Mean altitude	Inclination	Launch site	Launcher	Status
Hulianwang Jishu Shiyan 1A, B	2	9 July 2023; 11:00	LEO			JSLC SLS-2	Long March 2C / YZ-1S; Y52	Success
Hulianwang Jishu Shiyan 2A, B, C	3	23 November 2023; 10:00	LEO			XSLC LC-3	Long March 2D / YZ-3; Y59	Success
Hulianwang Jishu Shiyan 3A	1	5 December 2023; 19:24	LEO			Bo Run Jiu Zhou platform, Yellow Sea	Jielong 3 Y2	Success
Hulianwang Jishu Shiyan 4A, B, C	3	30 December 2023; 00:13	LEO			JSLC SLS-2	Long March 2C / YZ-1S; Y73	Success
Hulianwang Gaogui 01	1	29 February 2024; 13:03	GEO			XSLC LC-2	Long March 3B/E; Y95	Success
Hulianwang Gaogui 02	1	1 August 2024; 13:14	GEO			XSLC LC-2	Long March 3B/E; Y97	Success
Hulianwang Gaogui 03	1	10 October 2024; 13:50	GEO			XSLC LC-2	Long March 3B/E; Y100	Success
Hulianwang Jishu Shiyan 5A	1	30 November 2024; 14:25	LEO			WCSLS LC-2	Long March 12; Y1	Success
Hulianwang Jishu Shiyan 6A, B, C, D	4	1 April 2025; 04:00	LEO			JSLC SLS-2	Long March 2D; Y78	Success
Hulianwang Jishu Shiyan 7A, B, C, D	4	16 September 2025; 01:00	LEO			JSLC SLS-2	Long March 2C/YZ-1S; Y87	Success
Hulianwang Jishu Shiyan 8A	1	11 April 2026; 11:32	LEO			Dong Fang Hang Tian Gang platform, South China Sea	Jielong 3	Success
Hulianwang Jishu Shiyan 9A, B, C, D	4	24 April 2026; 06:35	LEO			XSLC LC-3	Long March 2D Y109	Success
Hulianwang Jishu Shiyan 10A, B, C, D	4	30 May 2026; 18:07	LEO			XSLC LC-3	Long March 2D Y119	Success

== See also ==
- Qianfan (Thousand Sails)
- Starlink
- Chang'e 6
- Shensuo
- SVOM
- Queqiao 2
