= Qianfan =

Chinese satellite internet constellation

Qianfan (Chinese: 千帆星座; pinyin: Qiānfān xīngzuò; lit. 'Thousand Sails Constellation'), officially known as the Spacesail Constellation and also referred to as G60 Starlink, is a planned satellite internet constellation in Low Earth orbit to create a system of worldwide internet coverage. It was created by Shanghai Spacecom Satellite Technology (SSST), a firm backed by the Shanghai Municipal People's Government and the Chinese Academy of Sciences. The project was started in 2024 as a rival to the Starlink satellite constellation installed by SpaceX, and plans to be constituted of over 15,000 satellites by the project's end. Phase 1 will have 1,296 satellites.

Satellite launches started in August 2024. As of June 2026, 200 satellites have been launched.

== History ==
=== 2023 ===
The "Thousand Sails" program began with the creation of the "Shanghai Action Plan to Promote Commercial Aerospace Development and Create a Space Information Industry Highland (2023-2025)" program first announced on 20 November. The government of Shanghai raised 6.7 billion Chinese Yuan ($943 million) in funds for the construction of the project, which was initially dubbed the G60 Starlink.

The first flat panel satellite for the megaconstellation was assembled in December 2023. The satellite's facilities were allocated to the state owned Shanghai Gesi Aerospace Technology (Genesat).

=== 2024 ===
On 6 August 2024 at 06:42 UTC, China launched its first set of eighteen flat panel satellites associated with the project using the Long March 6A launch vehicle, China's 35th orbital launch in the year 2024. The rocket launched from the Taiyuan Launch Complex located in the north of Shanxi Province, and brought the satellites into a polar orbit. The Chinese Academy of Sciences and the China Aerospace Science and Technology Corporation both reported that the space mission was "a complete success". However, the United States Space Command reported that soon after the delivery of 18 satellites, the upper stage of Long March 6A broke apart and created a cloud of debris of "over 300 pieces of trackable debris in low-Earth orbit".

On 15 October 2024 at 11:06 UTC, a Long March 6A rocket launched the second group of eighteen Qianfan satellites into a polar orbit.

On 5 December 2024 at 04:41 UTC, a third group of eighteen Qianfan satellites were launched into a polar orbit by a Long March 6A rocket.

=== Future ===
Based on Chinese state media China Central Television coverage, China has planned to launch and establish 648 satellites by the end of 2025 as part of the 1,296 satellites in the first phase of construction of the constellation, with the finished broadband multimedia satellite megaconstellation consisting of over 15,000 internet satellites. Of these, 108 satellites were planned to be deployed in 2024 in separate launches of 36 and 54 internet satellites each, and would operate in "Ku, Q and V" bands.

The system also planned to annex finite frequencies and orbital slots, and also provide data security.

Together with the state-owned Guowang constellation, which plans 13,000 satellites, China's two satellite internet constellations total a planned 28,000 satellites, compared with more than 11,000 for SpaceX's Starlink.

== Satellite launch statistics ==
=== Satellites launched ===
- Launch failure
- Launch success
- Planned

== Launches ==
Name	Number of satellites	Launch (UTC)	Orbit	Orbital apsis	Inclination	SCN	COSPAR ID	Launch site	Launcher	Status
G60 Polar Group 01	18	6 August 2024; 06:42	Polar					TSLC LA-9A	Long March 6A	Success
G60 Polar Group 02	18	15 October 2024; 11:06	Polar					TSLC LA-9A	Long March 6A	Success
G60 Polar Group 03	18	5 December 2024; 04:41	Polar					TSLC LA-9A	Long March 6A	Success
G60 Polar Group 04	18	23 January 2025; 05:11	Polar					TSLC LA-9A	Long March 6A	Success
G60 Polar Group 05	18	11 March 2025; 04:38	Polar					WCSLS LC-1	Long March 8	Success
G60 Polar Group 06	18	17 October 2025; 07:09	Polar					TSLC LC-9A	Long March 6A	Success
G60 Polar Group 07	18	7 April 2026; 13:32	Polar					WCSLS LC-1	Long March 8	Success
G60 Polar Group 08	18	12 May 2026; 11:59	Polar					TSLC LA-9A	Long March 6A	Success
G60 Polar Group 09	18	17 May 2026; 02:42	Polar					WCSLS LC-1	Long March 8	Success
G60 Polar Group 10	2	1 June 2026; 08:40	Polar					JSLC CZ-12 Pad	Long March 12B	Success
G60 Polar Group 11	18	4 June 2026; 11:39	Polar					TSLC LA-9A	Long March 6A	Success
G60 Polar Group 12	18	5 June 2026; 06:34	Polar					TSLC LA-9A	Long March 6A	Success
DTC 01 SSST; China Mobile 02 (Test satellite)	1	9 June 2026; 08:23	LEO					JSLC Site-96	Zhuque-2E	Success
G60 Polar Group 13	18	4 July 2026; 09:30	Polar					TSLC LA-9A	Long March 6A	Success
G60 Polar Group 14	20	5 July 2026; 01:43	Polar					WCSLS LC-1	Long March 8A	Success
G60 Polar Group 19	10	15 September 2026; 14:26	SSO					JSLC Site-96	Zhuque-2E	Success
G60 Polar Group 26	9	15 September 2026; 22:00	Polar					Oriental Spaceport (Specially converted barge off Haiyang Port)	Gravity-1	Success

== Impact on the sky ==
Qianfan satellites are bright, and their light pollution poses a threat to observational astronomy. At their current luminosity the spacecraft will leave streaks in photographic research images that cannot be removed by software. They would also interfere with aesthetic appreciation of the night sky because they are visible to the unaided eye. Other spacecraft operators have mitigated the brightness of the satellites to reduce their impact on astronomy. This is a known problem with satellite constellations, which can be partly mitigated.

== See also ==
- Guowang/SatNet
- Starlink
- Chang'e 6
- Shensuo
- SVOM
- Queqiao-2
