= Yunhai-3 =

Set of satellites for Chinese meteorological studies

- Operator: CNSA
- COSPAR ID: 2022-151A (Yunhai-3 01) 2024-058A (Yunhai-3 02)

Spacecraft properties
- Manufacturer: CASC

Start of mission
- Rocket: Long March 6A
- Contractor: CASC

Yunhai-3 is the third set of satellites in a series of Chinese meteorological satellites developed by the Chinese military. The satellites are built by the China Aerospace Science and Technology Corporation (CASC) and then transported to Taiyuan for launch. Their main uses are in the fields of atmospheric data for weather prediction, ionosphere, gravity and climate research, as well as disaster prevention. Like the Yunhai-2 series, the satellites reportedly use the Global Navigation Satellite System Radio Occultation (GNSS-RO).

== Satellites ==
As of March 29, 2024, there are 2 satellites in the Yunhai-3 constellation in orbit, Yunhai-3 01 and Yunhai-3 02.

Name	COSPAR	Launch Date	Launch Vehicle	Outcome
Yunhai-3 01	2022-151A	November 11, 2022	Long March 6A	Success
Yunhai-3 02	2024-058A	March 26, 2024	Long March 6A	Success

ㅤ

=== Yunhai-3 01 ===
Yunhai-3 01
- Operator: CNSA
- COSPAR ID: 2022-151A

Spacecraft properties
- Manufacturer: CASC

Start of mission
- Launch date: November 11, 2022, 22:52:00 UTC
- Rocket: Long March 6A
- Launch site: LC-9A, Tiayuan Satellite Launch Center
- Contractor: CASC

Orbital parameters
- Semi-major axis: 7226km
- Periapsis altitude: 854.8km
- Apoapsis altitude: 855.9km
- Inclination: 98.8
- Period: 101.9 minutes

Yunhai-3 01 was launched on November 11, 2022, aboard a Long March 6A rocket from LC-9A at Taiyuan Satellite Launch Center in China. It was launched into a sun-synchronous orbit and given the COSPAR ID "2022-151A". It was placed into an ~856 x 855 km orbit with an inclination of 98.8 degrees. The satellite is still in operation as of March 29, 2024. The upper stage of the Long March 6A used to launch Yunhai-3 01 broke up in orbit into 37 pieces of debris, possibly due to a propellant explosion. Nine of the 37 pieces of debris currently remain in orbit.

ㅤ

ㅤ

ㅤ

ㅤ

ㅤ

=== Yunhai-3 02 ===
Yunhai-3 02
- Operator: CNSA
- COSPAR ID: 2024-058A

Spacecraft properties
- Manufacturer: CASC

Start of mission
- Launch date: March 26, 2024, 22:51:00 UTC
- Rocket: Long March 6A
- Launch site: LC-9A, Taiyuan Satellite Launch Center
- Contractor: CASC

Orbital parameters
- Semi-major axis: 7226km
- Periapsis altitude: 847.3km
- Apoapsis altitude: 863.7km
- Inclination: 98.82
- Period: 101.9 minutes

Yunhai-3 02 was launched on March 26, 2024, on a Long March 6A from LC-9A at Taiyuan Satellite Launch Center. It was also launched into a sun-synchronous orbit. As of March 29, 2024, it is in an ~864 x 847 km orbit with an inclination of 98.82 degrees.

ㅤㅤ

ㅤ

ㅤ

ㅤ

ㅤ

ㅤ

ㅤ

ㅤ

ㅤ

ㅤ
