= Long March 6A =

Launch vehicle

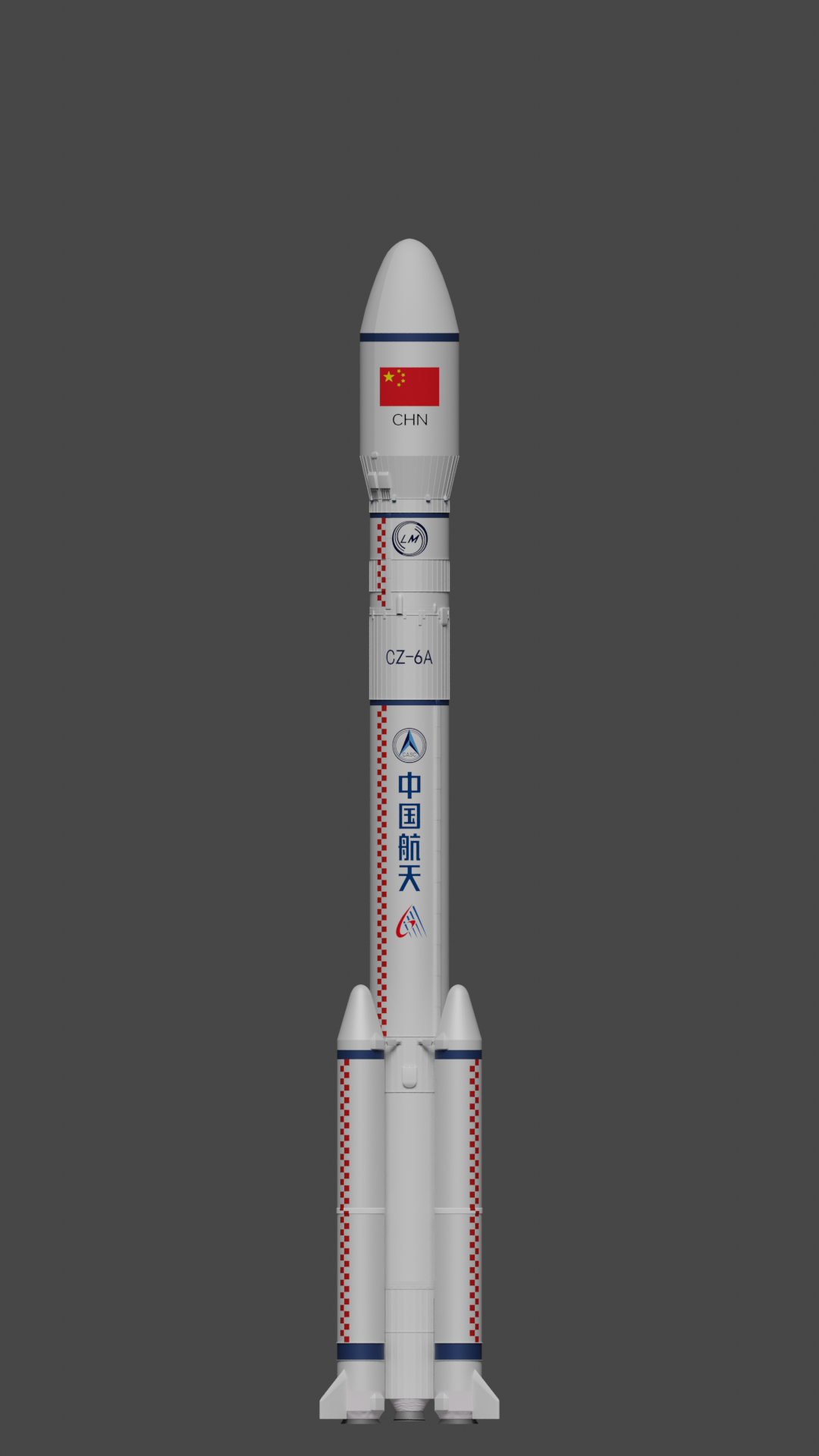
- Rendering of Long March 6A
- Function: Medium-lift launch vehicle
- Manufacturer: Shanghai Academy of Spaceflight Technology
- Country of origin: China

Size
- Height: 50 m (160 ft); 52 m (171 ft) with extended fairing
- Diameter: 3.35 m (11.0 ft)
- Mass: 530,000 kg (1,170,000 lb)
- Stages: 2

Capacity

Payload to LEO
- Mass: 8,000 kg (18,000 lb)

Payload to 500 km (310 mi) SSO
- Mass: 6,500 kg (14,300 lb)

Payload to 700 km (430 mi) SSO
- Mass: 5,000 kg (11,000 lb)

Associated rockets
- Family: Long March
- Comparable: Antares; Soyuz-2

Launch history
- Status: Active
- Launch sites: Taiyuan, LA-9A
- Total launches: 28
- Success(es): 28
- First flight: 29 March 2022
- Last flight: 23 October 2026 (most recent)

Boosters – FG-112
- No. boosters: 4
- Height: 15.1 m (50 ft)
- Diameter: 2.0 m (6 ft 7 in)
- Maximum thrust: 1,214 kN (273,000 lb_{f})
- Total thrust: 4,828 kN (1,085,000 lb_{f})
- Propellant: solid

First stage
- Height: 30.5 m (100 ft)
- Diameter: 3.35 m (11.0 ft)
- Powered by: 2 × YF-100
- Maximum thrust: 2,376 kN (534,000 lb_{f})
- Specific impulse: SL: 300 s (2.9 km/s); vac: 335 s (3.29 km/s)
- Propellant: RP-1/LOX

Second stage
- Diameter: 3.35 m (11.0 ft)
- Powered by: 1 × YF-115
- Maximum thrust: 180 kN (40,000 lb_{f})
- Specific impulse: vac: 341.5 s (3.349 km/s)
- Propellant: RP-1/LOX

The Long March 6A (Chinese: 长征六号甲运载火箭) or Chang Zheng 6A as in pinyin, abbreviated LM 6A for export or CZ 6A within China, is a Chinese medium-lift launch vehicle in the Long March family, which was developed by the China Aerospace Science and Technology Corporation (CASC).

The vehicle is a further development of the Long March 6, with two YF-100 engines on the first stage as opposed to one on the Long March 6, augmented by four solid rocket boosters. The Long March 6A is China's first rocket with solid rocket boosters, and only one so far to combine solid and liquid fuel technology in one rocket. There also exists a shorter boosterless variant of the 6A called the Long March 6C.

The maiden launch of the Long March 6A took place on March 29, 2022, successfully reaching orbit. It was also the first launch from the newly built launch complex 9A in Taiyuan.

== Launch statistics ==
- Failure
- Partial failure
- Success
- Planned

== List of launches ==
Flight number	Serial number	Date (UTC)	Launch site	Payload	Orbit	Result
1	Y1	29 March 2022; 09:50	Taiyuan, LA-9A	Pujiang-2; Tiankun-2	SSO	Success
2	Y2	11 November 2022; 22:52	Taiyuan, LA-9A	Yunhai-3 01	SSO	Success
3	Y5	10 September 2023; 04:30	Taiyuan, LA-9A	Yaogan 40-01A; Yaogan 40-01B; Yaogan 40-01C	LEO	Success
4	Y4	31 October 2023; 22:50	Taiyuan, LA-9A	Tianhui 5A; Tianhui 5B	SSO	Success
5	Y3	26 March 2024; 22:51	Taiyuan, LA-9A	Yunhai-3 02	SSO	Success
6	Y7	4 July 2024; 22:49	Taiyuan, LA-9A	Tianhui 5C; Tianhui 5D	SSO	Success
7	Y21	6 August 2024; 06:42	Taiyuan, LA-9A	Qianfan × 18 (G60 Polar Group 01)	Polar	Success
8	Y20	15 October 2024; 11:06	Taiyuan, LA-9A	Qianfan × 18 (G60 Polar Group 02)	Polar	Success
9	Y22	5 December 2024; 04:41	Taiyuan, LA-9A	Qianfan × 18 (G60 Polar Group 03)	Polar	Success
10	Y6	23 January 2025; 05:15	Taiyuan, LA-9A	Qianfan × 18 (G60 Polar Group 06)	Polar	Success
11	Y11	18 April 2025; 22:51	Taiyuan, LA-9A	Shiyan 27-01; Shiyan 27-02; Shiyan 27-03; Shiyan 27-04; Shiyan 27-05; Shiyan 27-06	SSO	Success
12	Y9	11 May 2025; 13:27	Taiyuan, LA-9A	Yaogan 40-02A; Yaogan 40-02B; Yaogan 40-02C	Polar	Success
13	Y8	5 June 2025; 20:45	Taiyuan, LA-9A	Huliangwang × 5 (SatNet LEO Group 04)	LEO	Success
14	Y14	27 July 2025; 10:03	Taiyuan, LA-9A	Huliangwang × 5 (SatNet LEO Group 05)	LEO	Success
15	Y10	17 August 2025; 14:15	Taiyuan, LA-9A	Huliangwang × 5 (SatNet LEO Group 09)	LEO	Success
16	Y12	6 September 2025; 16:34	Taiyuan, LA-9A	Yaogan 40-03A; Yaogan 40-03B; Yaogan 40-03C	Polar	Success
17	Y16	27 September 2025; 12:40	Taiyuan, LA-9A	Huliangwang × 5 (SatNet LEO Group 11)	LEO	Success
18	Y24	17 October 2025; 07:08	Taiyuan, LA-9A	Qianfan × 18 (G60 Polar Group 18)	Polar	Success
19	Y15	8 December 2025; 22:11	Taiyuan, LA-9A	Huliangwang × 5 (SatNet LEO Group 15)	LEO	Success
20	Y27	13 January 2026; 14:16	Taiyuan, LA-9A	Yaogan 50-01	LEO	Success
21	Y28	15 March 2026; 13:22	Taiyuan, LA-9A	Yaogan 50-02	LEO	Success
22	Y17	8 April 2026; 19:38	Taiyuan, LA-9A	Huliangwang × 5 (SatNet LEO Group 21)	LEO	Success
23	Y23	12 May 2026; 11:59	Taiyuan, LA-9A	Qianfan × 18 (G60 Polar Group #8)	Polar	Success
24	Y25	4 June 2026; 11:39	Taiyuan, LA-9A	Qianfan × 18 (G60 Polar Group #11)	Polar	Success
25	Y26	4 July 2026; 09:30	Taiyuan, LA-9A	Qianfan × 18 (G60 Polar Group #13)	Polar	Success
26	Y18	30 July 2026; 01:00	Taiyuan, LA-9A	TJS-27A; TJS-27B	LEO	Success
27	Y13	24 September 2026; 08:46	Taiyuan, LA-9A	Yaogan 40-04A; Yaogan 40-04B; Yaogan 40-04C	Polar	Success
28	Y30	23 October 2026; 10:15	Taiyuan, LA-9A	Yaogan 50-03	LEO	Success

== Anomalies ==
=== Some upper stages fragmented before reentry ===
After the release of Yunhai 3 following the Y2 launch of 11 November 2022, the Long March 6 upper stage broke up into more than 50 pieces of debris, which later expanded to more than 781 pieces. The vehicle was intended to re-enter in one piece and burn up. Following the November 2022 breakup, similar events were observed after the launches of 26 March 2024, 4 July 2024, and 6 August 2024. The reason for the breakups is unclear, but it may be related to upper stage passivation or insulation.

== See also ==
- List of Long March launches (2025-2029)
- Comparison of orbital launchers families
- Comparison of orbital launch systems
