= Long March 8 =

Chinese orbital launch vehicle

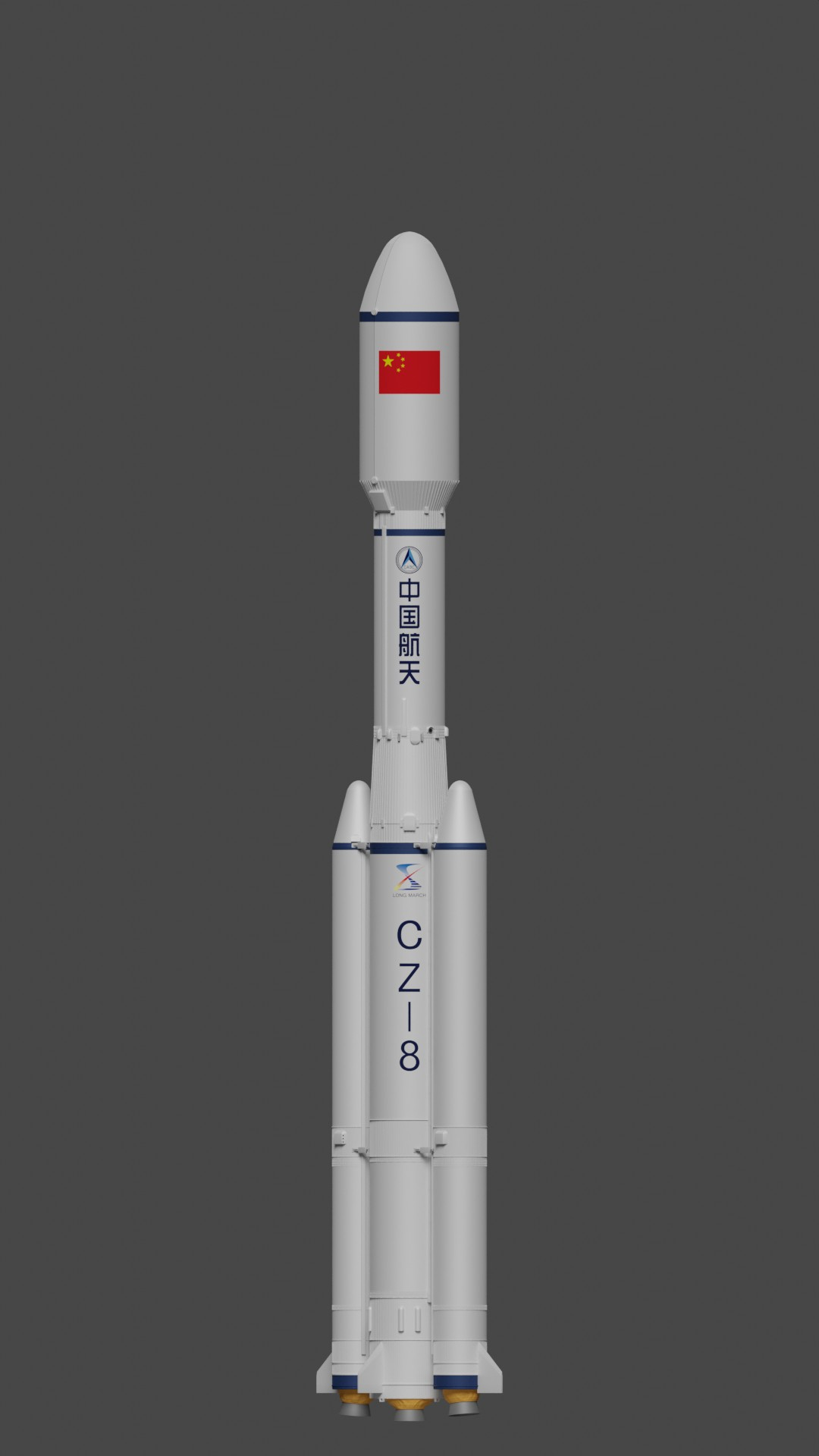
- Rendering of Long March 8 Y1
- Function: Orbital launch vehicle
- Manufacturer: China Academy of Launch Vehicle Technology (CALT)
- Country of origin: China

Size
- Height: CZ-8 (core only): 48 m (157 ft); CZ-8: 50.34 m (165.2 ft); CZ-8A: 50.5 m (166 ft)
- Diameter: 3.35 m (11.0 ft)
- Mass: CZ-8 (core only): 198,000 kg (437,000 lb); CZ-8: 356,000 kg (785,000 lb); CZ-8A: 371,000 kg (818,000 lb)
- Stages: 2

Capacity

Payload to SSO
- Altitude: 700 km (430 mi)
- Mass: CZ-8 (core only): 3,000 kg (6,600 lb); CZ-8: 5,000 kg (11,000 lb); CZ-8A: 7,000 kg (15,000 lb)

Payload to LEO
- Mass: 8,100 kg (17,900 lb)

Payload to GTO
- Mass: 2,800 kg (6,200 lb)

Payload to TLI
- Mass: 1,500 kg (3,300 lb)

Associated rockets
- Comparable: Soyuz-2; Antares; Falcon 9; Atlas V; Ariane 62; H3

Launch history
- Status: Active
- Launch sites: Wenchang, LC-2; Wenchang Commercial, LC-1
- Total launches: 20 (8: 7, 8A: 13)
- Success(es): 20 (8: 7, 8A: 13)
- First flight: 8: 22 December 2020; 8A: 11 February 2025
- Last flight: 8: 5 June 2026 (most recent); 8A: 20 November 2026 (most recent)

Boosters – K2
- No. boosters: 0 or 2
- Height: 26.903 m (88.26 ft)
- Diameter: 2.25 m (7 ft 5 in)
- Powered by: 1 × YF-100
- Maximum thrust: SL: 1,200 kN (270,000 lb_{f}) vac: 1,340 kN (300,000 lb_{f})
- Total thrust: SL: 4,800 kN (1,100,000 lb_{f}) vac: 5,360 kN (1,200,000 lb_{f})
- Specific impulse: SL: 300 s (2.9 km/s) vac: 335 s (3.29 km/s)
- Propellant: RP-1 / LOX

First stage – K3
- Height: 25.083 m (82.29 ft)
- Diameter: 3.35 m (11.0 ft)
- Powered by: 2 × YF-100
- Maximum thrust: SL: 2,400 kN (540,000 lb_{f}) vac: 2,680 kN (600,000 lb_{f})
- Specific impulse: SL: 300 s (2.9 km/s) vac: 335 s (3.29 km/s)
- Propellant: RP-1 / LOX

Second stage (CZ-8)
- Height: 12.375 m (40.60 ft)
- Diameter: 3 m (9.8 ft)
- Powered by: 2 × YF-75
- Maximum thrust: 167.17 kN (37,580 lb_{f})
- Specific impulse: 438 s (4.30 km/s)
- Propellant: LH_{2} / LOX

Second stage (CZ-8A)
- Height: 12.375 m (40.60 ft)
- Diameter: 3.35 m (11.0 ft)
- Powered by: 2 × YF-75H
- Maximum thrust: 200 kN (45,000 lb_{f})
- Specific impulse: 442.6 s (4.340 km/s)
- Propellant: LH_{2} / LOX

Long March 8 (Chinese: 长征八号运载火箭) is an orbital launch vehicle developed by the China Academy of Launch Vehicle Technology to launch up to 5000 kg to a 700 km altitude Sun-synchronous orbit (SSO).

== Design ==
The rocket is based on the Long March 7 with its dual engine first stage and single engine boosters (both with RP-1 fuel). Instead of the LM-7 RP-1 fuelled 2nd stage, the LM-8 uses the existing liquid hydrogen burning third stage of the Long March 3A/3B/3C and 7A as its second stage.

Whereas the LM-7 uses 4 boosters, the LM-8 normally uses just 2. The boosters are omitted in the "core only" variant that first flew on its second launch in February 2022.

In 2018 it was planned that a future launch vehicle variant of the Long March 8 will be partially reusable by featuring a combined booster recovery of the first stage and the boosters as a single unit.

== History ==
The maiden flight of the Long March 8 was launched on 22 December 2020 from the Wenchang Spacecraft Launch Site.

The "core only" variant first flew in February 2022.

== CZ-8A variant ==
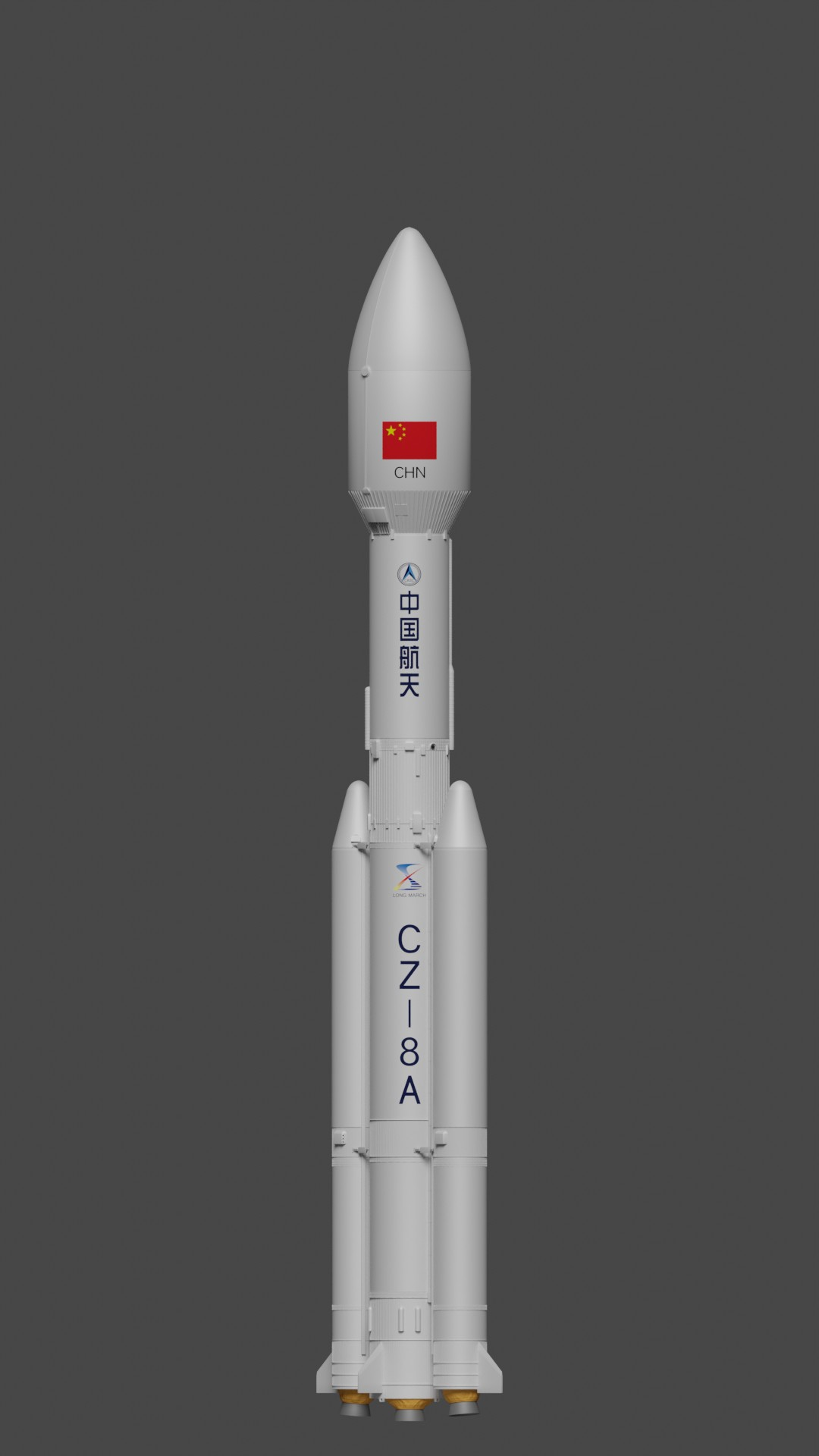
Rendering of CZ-8A

An upgraded version of the Long March 8, the Long March 8A (Chinese: 长征八号甲运载火箭), has successfully debuted on February 11, 2025 with increased capability of up to 7 tonnes to a 700 km altitude sun-synchronous orbit.

Its hydrolox 2nd stage has a larger diameter (to match the 3.35 meters diameter core stage), and has 2 upgraded versions of the YF-75D engines (known as the YF-75H) with increased thrust to 10 tonnes each, through measures such as increased turbopump speeds.

The Long March 8A can also use a larger 5.2 meters diameter payload fairing.

According to a public announcement published by China's bureau of procurement on its information platform in June 2026, the China Academy of Sciences has applied for the single-source procurement of a Long March launch vehicle to launch the Enhanced X-ray Timing and Polarimetry Observatory (likely for a Long March 8A to launch in 2030). The prospective contract amount is for 245.2 million RMB (about $36.1 million at 2026 exchange rate).

== Launch statistics ==
=== Launch outcomes ===
- Failure
- Partial failure
- Success
- Planned

=== Rocket configurations ===
- CZ-8 core only
- CZ-8 standard
- CZ-8A

== List of launches ==
Flight No.	Variant	Variant serial Nr.	Date / time (UTC)	Launch site	Payload	Orbit	Outcome
1	CZ-8	Y1	22 December 2020; 04:37	Wenchang, LC‑2	Xinjishu Yanzheng 7 (XJY-7); Haisi-1; Tianqi Xingzuo 08 (Ping'an-1); Yuanguang-1; ET-SMART-RSS (Zhixing-1A)	SSO	Success
2	CZ-8 (core only)	Y2	27 February 2022; 03:06	Wenchang, LC‑2	Dayun (Xingshidai-17); Hainan-1 01, 02; Jilin-1 Gaofen-03D 10–18; Jilin-1 Mofang-02A 01; Qimingxing-1; Taijing-3 01; Taijing-4 01; Tianxian-1 (Chaohu-1); Chuangxing Leishen; Wenchang-1 01, 02; XD-1; Tianqi-19	SSO	Success
3	CZ-8	Y3	20 March 2024; 00:31	Wenchang, LC‑2	Queqiao-2; Tiandu-1; Tiandu-2	Lunar	Success
4	CZ-8A	Y1	11 February 2025; 09:30	Wenchang, LC‑2	Huliangwang × 9 (SatNet LEO Group 02)	LEO	Success
5	CZ-8	Y6	11 March 2025; 16:38	Wenchang Commercial, LC‑1	Qianfan × 18 (G60 Polar Group 05)	Polar	Success
6	CZ-8A	Y3	30 July 2025; 07:49	Wenchang Commercial, LC‑1	Huliangwang × 9 (SatNet LEO Group 06)	LEO	Success
7	CZ-8A	Y2	25 August 2025; 19:08	Wenchang Commercial, LC‑1	Huliangwang × 9 (SatNet LEO Group 10)	LEO	Success
8	CZ-8A	Y4	16 October 2025; 01:33	Wenchang Commercial, LC‑1	Huliangwang × 9 (SatNet LEO Group 12)	LEO	Success
9	CZ-8A	Y5	6 December 2025; 07:53	Wenchang Commercial, LC‑1	Huliangwang × 9 (SatNet LEO Group 14)	LEO	Success
10	CZ-8A	Y6	25 December 2025; 23:26	Wenchang Commercial, LC‑1	Huliangwang × 9 (SatNet LEO Group 17)	LEO	Success
11	CZ-8A	Y7	13 January 2026; 15:25	Wenchang Commercial, LC‑1	Huliangwang × 9 (SatNet LEO Group 18)	LEO	Success
12	CZ-8A	Y8	12 March 2026; 19:48	Wenchang Commercial, LC‑1	Huliangwang × 9 (SatNet LEO Group 20)	LEO	Success
13	CZ-8	Y7	7 April 2026; 13:32	Wenchang Commercial, LC‑1	Qianfan × 18 (G60 Polar Group 07)	Polar	Success
14	CZ-8	Y8	17 May 2026; 14:42	Wenchang Commercial, LC‑1	Qianfan × 18 (G60 Polar Group #9)	Polar	Success
15	CZ-8	Y9	5 June 2026; 06:34	Wenchang Commercial, LC‑1	Qianfan × 18 (G60 Polar Group 12)	Polar	Success
16	CZ-8A	Y9	5 July 2026; 13:43	Wenchang Commercial, LC‑1	Qianfan × 20 (G60 Polar Group 14)	Polar	Success
17	CZ-8A	Y10	4 August 2026; 08:52	Wenchang Commercial, LC‑1	Huliangwang × 9 (SatNet LEO Group 23)	LEO	Success
18	CZ-8A	Y11	23 September 2026; 13:32	Wenchang Commercial, LC‑1	Huliangwang × 9 (SatNet LEO Group 26)	LEO	Success
19	CZ-8A	Y12	25 October 2026; 02:03	Wenchang Commercial, LC‑1	Huliangwang × 9 (SatNet LEO Group 28)	LEO	Success
20	CZ-8A	Y13	20 November 2026; 11:59	Wenchang Commercial, LC‑1	Huliangwang × 9 (SatNet LEO Group 30)	LEO	Success

== See also ==
- List of Long March launches (2025-2029)
- Long March 9 – Chinese super-heavy rocket in development
- Comparison of orbital launchers families
- Comparison of orbital launch systems
- Expendable launch system
- Lists of rockets
