= HICAL =

Chinese spaceport company

Hainan International Commercial Aerospace Launch Co., Ltd.
- Trade name: HICAL
- Native name: 海南国际商业航天发射有限公司
- Type: State-owned enterprise
- Industry: Transport
- Founded: 2 June 2022; 4 years ago
- Headquarters: Wenchang, Hainan, China
- Key people: Yang Tianliang (Chairman of the Board)
- Products: Spaceport operations and services
- Owner: Hainan Provincial Government; China Satellite Network Group; CASIC; CASC
- Subsidiaries: Wenchang Commercial Space Launch Site

Hainan International Commercial Aerospace Launch Co., Ltd., or HICAL, is a Chinese state-owned company that operates the Wenchang Commercial Space Launch Site, China's first commercial spaceport. Established in 2022, HICAL is the first commercially incorporated company in China to independently own and manage a spaceport.

== History and Launch Pads ==
Hainan International Commercial Aerospace Launch Co., Ltd. (HICAL) was incorporated on June 2, 2022. The company is jointly funded by the Hainan Provincial Government and three state-owned aerospace contractors: China Aerospace Science and Technology Corporation, China Aerospace Science and Industry Corporation, and China Satellite Network Group. HICAL was established with a starting capital of RMB 1.5 billion.

On July 6, 2022, a groundbreaking ceremony was held for the Wenchang Commercial Space Launch Site, which is China's first commercial space launch complex, and which is fully funded, constructed and operated by HICAL. Launch Complex 1 was completed in December 2023 and Launch Complex 2 is expected to be completed in 2024.

Wenchang Commercial Space Launch Site
- Location: Wenchang, Hainan, China
- Operator: HICAL
- Total launches: 27
- Launch pad: Two
Launch Complex 1 launch history
- Status: Active
- Launches: 16
- First launch: 11 March 2025; Long March 8 / G60 Polar Group 05
- Last launch: 20 November 2026; Long March 8A / SatNet LEO Group #30
- Associated rockets: Long March 8 Long March 8A
Launch Complex 2 launch history
- Status: Active
- Launches: 11
- First launch: 30 November 2024; Long March 12 / Demo Flight
- Last launch: 8 November 2026; Long March 12 / SatNet LEO Group #29
- Associated rockets: Long March 12 (active); Long March 10B (active); Tianlong-3 (future); Pallas-1 (future); Nebula-1 (future); Gravity-2 (future); Kinetica 2 (future)

== Wenchang Commercial Space Launch Site ==
The Wenchang Commercial Space Launch Site (Chinese: 文昌商业航天发射场), located at Wenchang, Hainan, is China's first commercial space launch site, and 5th space launch site. The launch site started construction in July 2022, and is expected to be put into service in 2024.

The Wenchang Commercial Space Launch Site is built and operated by HICAL, a joint venture of the Hainan government and three state-owned conglomerates. In China, a commercial space center is a site owned by an entity other than the Government or Military.

Construction of the site started in July 2022, and the launch complex one was finished on December 29, 2023. As of April 2024, the second pad is set to be finished by the end of May, with 19 different rockets from nine companies expected to launch using LC-2.

== Missions ==
=== Previous launches ===
Date (UTC)	Vehicle	Serial number	Launch Pad	Payload	Outcome	Notes
30 November 2024, 14:25	Long March 12	Y1	LC-2	Hulianwang Jishu Shiyan 5A; JSW-03	Success	First launch of the Long March 12 launch vehicle and the first launch from the Wenchang Commercial Space Launch Site.
11 March 2025, 16:38	Long March 8	Y6	LC-1	Qianfan × 18 (G60 Polar Group 05)	Success	First launch from the Wenchang Commercial Space Launch Site's LC-1.
30 July 2025, 07:50	Long March 8A	Y3	LC-1	Guowang × 9 (SatNet LEO Group 06)	Success	First flight of Long March 8A from Wenchang Commercial Space Launch Site.
4 August 2025, 10:20	Long March 12	Y2	LC-2	Guowang × 9 (SatNet LEO Group 07)	Success	
25 August 2025, 19:08	Long March 8A	Y2	LC-1	Guowang × 9 (SatNet LEO Group 10)	Success	
16 October 2025, 01:33	Long March 8A	Y4	LC-1	Guowang × 9 (SatNet LEO Group 12)	Success	
10 November 2025, 02:41	Long March 12	Y3	LC-2	Guowang × 9 (SatNet LEO Group 13)	Success	
6 December 2025, 07:53	Long March 8A	Y5	LC-1	Guowang × 9 (SatNet LEO Group 14)	Success	
11 December 2025, 23:00	Long March 12	Y4	LC-2	Guowang × 9 (SatNet LEO Group 16)	Success	
25 December 2025, 23:26	Long March 8A	Y6	LC-1	Guowang × 9 (SatNet LEO Group 17)	Success	
13 January 2026, 15:25	Long March 8A	Y7	LC-1	Guowang × 9 (SatNet LEO Group 18)	Success	
19 January 2026, 07:48	Long March 12	Y5	LC-2	Guowang × 9 (SatNet LEO Group 19)	Success	
12 March 2026, 19:48	Long March 8A	Y8	LC-1	Guowang × 9 (SatNet LEO Group 20)	Success	
7 April 2026, 13:32	Long March 8	Y7	LC-1	Qianfan × 18 (G60 Polar Group 07)	Success	
17 May 2026, 14:42	Long March 8	Y8	LC-1	Qianfan × 18 (G60 Polar Group #9)	Success	
5 June 2026, 06:34	Long March 8	Y9	LC-1	Qianfan × 18 (G60 Polar Group #12)	Success	
17 June 2026, 02:44	Long March 12	Y7	LC-2	Guowang × 9 (SatNet LEO Group 22)	Success	
5 July 2026, 13:43	Long March 8A	Y9	LC-1	Qianfan × 20 (G60 Polar Group #14)	Success	
10 July 2026, 04:15	Long March 10B	Y1	LC-2	Demo Flight	Success	
4 August 2026, 08:52	Long March 8A	Y10	LC-1	Guowang × 9 (SatNet LEO Group 23)	Success	
16 August 2026, 04:10	Long March 12	Y8	LC-2	Guowang × 9 (SatNet LEO Group 24)	Success	
17 September 2026, 00:32	Long March 12	Y9	LC-2	Guowang × 9 (SatNet LEO Group 25)	Success	
23 September 2026, 13:32	Long March 8A	Y11	LC-1	Guowang × 9 (SatNet LEO Group 26)	Success	
9 October 2026, 19:27	Long March 12	Y10	LC-2	Guowang × 9 (SatNet LEO Group 27)	Success	
25 October 2026, 02:03	Long March 8A	Y12	LC-1	Guowang × 9 (SatNet LEO Group 28)	Success	
8 November 2026, 20:24	Long March 12	Y11	LC-2	Guowang × 9 (SatNet LEO Group 29)	Success	
20 November 2026, 11:59	Long March 8A	Y13	LC-1	Guowang × 9 (SatNet LEO Group 30)	Success	

=== Next launches ===
Date (UTC)	Vehicle	Serial number	Launch Pad	Payload	Outcome	Notes
2025	Long March ?	Y?	LC-1 or LC-2	Unknown Payload	Planned	

== See also ==
- Chinese space program
- Wenchang Space Launch Site
- Jiuquan Satellite Launch Center
- Taiyuan Satellite Launch Center
- Xichang Satellite Launch Center
