= List of spaceflight launches in October–December 2025 =

This article lists orbital and suborbital launches planned for the fourth quarter of the year 2025, including launches planned for 2025 without a specific launch date.

For all other spaceflight activities, see 2025 in spaceflight. For launches before October 2025, see List of spaceflight launches in January–March 2025, List of spaceflight launches in April–June 2025, or List of spaceflight launches in July–September 2025.

- ← Jan
- Feb
- Mar
- Apr
- May
- Jun
- Jul
- Aug
- Sep
- Oct
- Nov
- Dec →

== Orbital launches ==
=== October ===
Date and time (UTC)	Rocket	Flight number	Launch site		LSP	
Date and time (UTC)	Payload (⚀ = CubeSat)	Operator	Orbit	Function	Decay (UTC)	Outcome
Date and time (UTC)	Remarks					
3 October; 14:06:50	(United States) Falcon 9 Block 5	Starlink Group 11-39	(United States) Vandenberg SLC-4E		(United States) SpaceX	
3 October; 14:06:50	(United States) Starlink × 28	SpaceX	Low Earth	Communications	In orbit	Operational
7 October; 06:46:10	(United States) Falcon 9 Block 5	Starlink Group 10-59	(United States) Cape Canaveral SLC-40		(United States) SpaceX	
7 October; 06:46:10	(United States) Starlink × 28	SpaceX	Low Earth	Communications	In orbit	Operational
8 October; 03:54	(United States) Falcon 9 Block 5	Starlink Group 11-17	(United States) Vandenberg SLC-4E		(United States) SpaceX	
8 October; 03:54	(United States) Starlink × 28	SpaceX	Low Earth	Communications	In orbit	Operational
11 October; 02:15	(China) Gravity-1	Y2	(China) Special Launch Platform, Yellow Sea		(China) Orienspace	
11 October; 02:15	(China) Jilin-1 Kuanfu-02B-07 (Jiangsu Dizhi)	Chang Guang Satellite Technology	Low Earth (SSO)	Earth observation	In orbit	Operational
11 October; 02:15	(China) Shutianyuxing 01	TBA	Low Earth (SSO)	TBA	In orbit	Operational
11 October; 02:15	(China) Shutianyuxing 02	TBA	Low Earth (SSO)	TBA	In orbit	Operational
13 October; 10:00	(China) Long March 2D	2D-Y92	(China) Jiuquan SLS-2		(China) CASC	
13 October; 10:00	(China) Shiyan-31	TBA	Low Earth	TBA	In orbit	Operational
14 October; 01:58:00	(United States) Falcon 9 Block 5	F9-545/KF-03	(United States) Cape Canaveral SLC-40		(United States) SpaceX	
14 October; 01:58:00	(United States) KuiperSat × 24	Kuiper Systems	Low Earth	Communications	In orbit	Operational
14 October; 01:58:00	Last of three Falcon 9 launches for Project Kuiper.					
14 October; 16:30:00	(United States) Electron	"Owl New World"	(New Zealand) Mahia LC-1A		(United States) Rocket Lab	
14 October; 16:30:00	(Japan) StriX-5	Synspective	Low Earth (SSO)	Earth observation	In orbit	Operational
15 October; 23:06:06	(United States) Falcon 9 Block 5	F9-546	(United States) Vandenberg SLC-4E		(United States) SpaceX	
15 October; 23:06:06	(United States) T1TL-C × 21	SDA	Low Earth (SSO)	Military communications	In orbit	Operational
15 October; 23:06:06	Second of six launches for the Space Development Agency's Transport Layer Tranche 1 (T1TL-C).					
16 October; 01:33:00	(China) Long March 8A	8A-Y4 / SatNet LEO Group 12	(China) Wenchang Commercial LC-1		(China) CASC	
16 October; 01:33:00	(China) Guowang × 9	CAST	Low Earth	Communications	In orbit	Operational
16 October; 01:33:00	600th Long March rocket launch.					
16 October; 09:27:10	(United States) Falcon 9 Block 5	Starlink Group 10-52	(United States) Cape Canaveral SLC-40		(United States) SpaceX	
16 October; 09:27:10	(United States) Starlink × 28	SpaceX	Low Earth	Communications	In orbit	Operational
17 October; 07:10	(China) Long March 6A	6A-Y24/G60 Polar Group 18	(China) Taiyuan LA-9A		(China) CASC	
17 October; 07:10	(China) Qianfan × 18	Shanghai Spacecom Satellite Technology (SSST)	Low Earth (Polar)	Communications	In orbit	Operational
19 October; 03:30	(China) Kinetica 1	Y8	(China) Jiuquan LS-130		(China) CAS Space	
19 October; 03:30	(Pakistan) PRSC-HS1	TBA	Low Earth	TBA	In orbit	Operational
19 October; 03:30	(China) AIRSAT-03 (Zhongke 03/TerraX-1)	CAS	Low Earth	Earth observation	In orbit	Operational
19 October; 03:30	(China) AIRSAT-04 (Zhongke 04/Beibuwan-1)	CAS	Low Earth	Earth observation	In orbit	Operational
19 October; 17:39:40	(United States) Falcon 9 Block 5	Starlink Group 10-17	(United States) Cape Canaveral SLC-40		(United States) SpaceX	
19 October; 17:39:40	(United States) Starlink × 28	SpaceX	Low Earth	Communications	In orbit	Operational
19 October; 17:39:40	Falcon 9 First Stage Booster (B1067) will become the first booster to launch 31 missions.					
19 October; 19:24:00	(United States) Falcon 9 Block 5	Starlink Group 11-19	(United States) Vandenberg SLC-4E		(United States) SpaceX	
19 October; 19:24:00	(United States) Starlink × 28	SpaceX	Low Earth	Communications	In orbit	Operational
19 October; 19:24:00	Included SpaceX's 10,000th Starlink satellite. SpaceX named this achievement "From Tintin to 10,000".					
22 October; 14:16	(United States) Falcon 9 Block 5	Starlink Group 11-5	(United States) Vandenberg SLC-4E		(United States) SpaceX	
22 October; 14:16	(United States) Starlink × 28	SpaceX	Low Earth	Communications	In orbit	Operational
23 October; 14:30	(China) Long March 5	Y9	(China) Wenchang LC-1		(China) CASC	
23 October; 14:30	(China) TJS-20	TBA	Geosynchronous	TBA	In orbit	Operational
24 October; 01:30	(United States) Falcon 9 Block 5	F9-551	(United States) Cape Canaveral SLC-40		(United States) SpaceX	
24 October; 01:30	(Spain) SpainSat NG II	Hisdesat	Geosynchronous	Communications	In orbit	Operational
24 October; 01:30	SpainSat NG II will replace Spainsat. Falcon 9 First Stage Booster (B1076) was expended in this mission.					
25 October; 14:20:50	(United States) Falcon 9 Block 5	Starlink Group 11-12	(United States) Vandenberg SLC-4E		(United States) SpaceX	
25 October; 14:20:50	(United States) Starlink × 28	SpaceX	Low Earth	Communications	In orbit	Operational
26 October; 00:00:15	(Japan) H3-24W	F7	(Japan) Tanegashima LA-Y2		(Japan) JAXA	
26 October; 00:00:15	(Japan) HTV-X1	JAXA	Low Earth (ISS)	ISS logistics / Technology demonstration	26 May 2026; ~14:09	Successful
26 October; 00:00:15	⚀ (Italy) CORAL	Sapienza University of Rome	Low Earth	Technology demonstration	In orbit	Operational
26 October; 00:00:15	⚀ (Mexico) Gxiba-1	UPAEP	Low Earth	Volcanoes monitoring	In orbit	Operational
26 October; 00:00:15	⚀ (Japan) HMU-SAT2	Hokkaido University of Science	Low Earth	Technology demonstration	In orbit	Operational
26 October; 00:00:15	⚀ (Thailand) KNACKSAT-2	KMUTNB	Low Earth	Technology demonstration	In orbit	Operational
26 October; 00:00:15	⚀ (Japan) LEOPARD	Kyutech	Low Earth	Technology demonstration	In orbit	Operational
26 October; 00:00:15	⚀ (Japan) Ten-Koh 2	Nihon University	Low Earth	Magnetosphere observation / Technology demonstration	In orbit	Operational
26 October; 00:00:15	⚀ (Malaysia) UiTMSAT-2	Universiti Teknologi MARA	Low Earth	Technology demonstration	In orbit	Operational
26 October; 00:00:15	Maiden flight of H3 rocket in H3-24W Configuration, with four SRB's and a wide long fairing. First HTV-X resupply mission to ISS. 300th Mission to ISS. CORAL, Gxiba-1, KNACKSAT-2, HMU-SAT2, LEOPARD, and UiTMSAT-2 were deployed into orbit from the ISS on 3 February 2026. Ten-Koh2 was deployed into orbit from HTV-X1 on 11 March 2026 after its departure from the ISS. At 63 metres tall, H3-24W is the tallest rocket launched by Japan as of 2025.					
26 October; 03:55	(China) Long March 3B/E		(China) Xichang LC-3		(China) CASC	
26 October; 03:55	(China) Gaofen 14-02	TBA	Low Earth (SSO)	Earth observation	In orbit	Operational
26 October; 15:00:40	(United States) Falcon 9 Block 5	Starlink Group 10-21	(United States) Cape Canaveral SLC-40		(United States) SpaceX	
26 October; 15:00:40	(United States) Starlink × 28	SpaceX	Low Earth	Communications	In orbit	Operational
26 October; 15:00:40	500th launch of Falcon 9 Block 5.					
28 October; 00:43:49	(United States) Falcon 9 Block 5	Starlink Group 11-21	(United States) Vandenberg SLC-4E		(United States) SpaceX	
28 October; 00:43:49	(United States) Starlink × 28	SpaceX	Low Earth	Communications	In orbit	Operational
29 October; 16:35:20	(United States) Falcon 9 Block 5	Starlink Group 10-37	(United States) Cape Canaveral SLC-40		(United States) SpaceX	
29 October; 16:35:20	(United States) Starlink × 29	SpaceX	Low Earth	Communications	In orbit	Operational
31 October; 15:44:00	(China) Long March 2F/G	2F-Y21	(China) Jiuquan SLS-1		(China) CASC	
31 October; 15:44:00	(China) Shenzhou 21	CMSA	Low Earth (TSS)	Human spaceflight	14 November 2025	Success
31 October; 15:44:00	Returned early with Shenzhou 20 crew due to Shenzhou 20 spacecraft being damaged by space debris.					
31 October; 23:30	(United States) Falcon 9 Block 5	Starlink Group 11-23	(United States) Vandenberg SLC-4E		(United States) SpaceX	
31 October; 23:30	(United States) Starlink × 28	SpaceX	Low Earth	Communications	In orbit	Operational

- ← Jan
- Feb
- Mar
- Apr
- May
- Jun
- Jul
- Aug
- Sep
- Oct
- Nov
- Dec →

=== November ===
Date and time (UTC)	Rocket	Flight number	Launch site		LSP	
Date and time (UTC)	Payload (⚀ = CubeSat)	Operator	Orbit	Function	Decay (UTC)	Outcome
Date and time (UTC)	Remarks					
2 November; 05:09:59	(United States) Falcon 9 Block 5	Bandwagon-4	(United States) Cape Canaveral SLC-40		(United States) SpaceX	
2 November; 05:09:59	(Argentina) BARYON 1L,N,P (SEMI 1-3)	TBA	Low Earth	TBA	In orbit	Operational
2 November; 05:09:59	(Czech Republic) CEVROSAT 1	CVC Electronic / CEVRO University	Low Earth	Technology demonstration	In orbit	Operational
2 November; 05:09:59	(Turkey) FGN-100-d2	Fergani Space	Low Earth	Technology demonstration	In orbit	Operational
2 November; 05:09:59	(United States) Haven Demo	Vast	Low Earth	Technology demonstration	5 February 2026	Successful
2 November; 05:09:59	(Finland) (United Arab Emirates) ICEYE X × 3 (Foresight 3-5)	ICEYE	Low Earth	Earth observation	In orbit	Operational
2 November; 05:09:59	(South Korea) KORSAT-4 (425 Project SAR Sat 4)	DAPA	Low Earth	Reconnaissance	In orbit	Operational
2 November; 05:09:59	(United States) Starcloud-1	Starcloud	Low Earth	Technology demonstration	In orbit	Operational
2 November; 05:09:59	⚀ (United States) (Netherlands) Lemur-2 AFFIE-WAUWIE	TBA	Low Earth	TBA	In orbit	Operational
2 November; 05:09:59	⚀ (United States) Tomorrow S8-S9	Tomorrow.io	Low Earth	Meteorology	In orbit	Operational
2 November; 05:09:59	▫ (Turkey) Taurus 1-4	GUMUSH AeroSpace	Low Earth	IoT	In orbit	Operational
2 November; 05:09:59	Dedicated SmallSat Rideshare mission to a 45-degree mid-inclination orbit, designated Bandwagon-4. Fifth of five dedicated launches for DAPA 425 Project (425 Project Flight 5).					
2 November; 11:56:00	(India) LVM3	M5	(India) Satish Dhawan SLP		(India) ISRO	
2 November; 11:56:00	(India) GSAT-7R (CMS-03)	Indian Navy	Geosynchronous	Communications	In orbit	Operational
2 November; 11:56:00	With a mass of 4.4 tonnes, GSAT-7R is the heaviest geostationary satellite to be launched on LVM3 by ISRO. After the Separation of GSAT-7R satellite, LVM3's CE-20 upper stage engine reignited for a second burn for the first time. Replacement Satellite for GSAT-7.					
3 November; 03:47:00	(China) Long March 7A	7A-Y13	(China) Wenchang LC-2		(China) CASC	
3 November; 03:47:00	(China) Yaogan-46	TBA	Medium Earth	TBA	In orbit	Operational
4 November; 21:02:17	(France) Ariane 62	VA265	(France) Kourou ELA-4		(France) Arianespace	
4 November; 21:02:17	Sentinel-1D	ESA	Low Earth (SSO)	Earth observation	In orbit	Operational
4 November; 21:02:17	Fourth Sentinel-1 satellite.					
5 November; 19:51:00	(United States) Electron	"The Nation God Navigates"	(New Zealand) Mahia LC-1B		(United States) Rocket Lab	
5 November; 19:51:00	(Japan) QPS-SAR-14 (YACHIHOKO-I)	iQPS	Low Earth	Earth observation	In orbit	Operational
5 November; 19:51:00	Fifth of 11 dedicated launches to support the build out of iQPS’ planned constellation of 36 synthetic aperture radar (SAR) satellites.					
6 November; 01:31:10	(United States) Falcon 9 Block 5	Starlink Group 6-81	(United States) Cape Canaveral SLC-40		(United States) SpaceX	
6 November; 01:31:10	(United States) Starlink × 29	SpaceX	Low Earth	Communications	In orbit	Operational
6 November; 22:13:50	(United States) Falcon 9 Block 5	Starlink Group 11-14	(United States) Vandenberg SLC-4E		(United States) SpaceX	
6 November; 22:13:50	(United States) Starlink × 28	SpaceX	Low Earth	Communications	In orbit	Operational
8 November; 22:01:00	(China) Long March 11H	HY6	(China) Special Launch Platform, Yellow Sea		(China) CASC	
8 November; 22:01:00	(China) Shiyan 32-01	TBA	Low Earth	TBA	In orbit	Operational
8 November; 22:01:00	(China) Shiyan 32-02	TBA	Low Earth	TBA	In orbit	Operational
8 November; 22:01:00	(China) Shiyan 32-03	TBA	Low Earth	TBA	In orbit	Operational
9 November; 03:32:00	(China) Kinetica 1	Y9	(China) Jiuquan LS-130		(China) CAS Space	
9 November; 03:32:00	(China) Chutian 2-01	CASIC	Low Earth (SSO)	TBA	In orbit	Operational
9 November; 03:32:00	(China) Chutian 2-02	CASIC	Low Earth (SSO)	TBA	In orbit	Operational
9 November; 08:10:10	(United States) Falcon 9 Block 5	Starlink Group 10-51	(United States) Kennedy LC-39A		(United States) SpaceX	
9 November; 08:10:10	(United States) Starlink × 29	SpaceX	Low Earth	Communications	In orbit	Operational
10 November; 02:42:00	(China) Long March 12	Y3 / SatNet LEO Group 13	(China) Wenchang Commercial LC-2		(China) CASC	
10 November; 02:42:00	(China) Guowang × 9	CAST	Low Earth	Communications	In orbit	Operational
10 November; 04:02	(China) Ceres-1	Y19	(China) Jiuquan		(China) Galactic Energy	
10 November; 04:02	(China) Jilin-1 Gaofen-04C	Chang Guang Satellite Technology	Low Earth (SSO)	Earth observation	10 November 2025	Launch Failure
10 November; 04:02	(China) Jilin-1 Pingtai-02A-04	Chang Guang Satellite Technology	Low Earth (SSO)	Earth observation	10 November 2025	Launch Failure
10 November; 04:02	(China) Zhongbei University-1	TBA	Low Earth (SSO)	TBA	10 November 2025	Launch Failure
10 November; 04:02	4th stage shut down prematurely 510 seconds into the burn.					
11 November; 03:21:00	(United States) Falcon 9 Block 5	Starlink Group 6-87	(United States) Cape Canaveral SLC-40		(United States) SpaceX	
11 November; 03:21:00	(United States) Starlink × 29	SpaceX	Low Earth	Communications	In orbit	Operational
13 November; 20:55:01	(United States) New Glenn	NG-2	(United States) Cape Canaveral LC-36A		(United States) Blue Origin	
13 November; 20:55:01	(United States) ESCAPADE Blue	Space Sciences Laboratory	Sun-Earth L_{2} to Areocentric	Magnetospheric science	In orbit	Operational
13 November; 20:55:01	(United States) ESCAPADE Gold	Space Sciences Laboratory	Sun-Earth L_{2} to Areocentric	Magnetospheric science	In orbit	Operational
13 November; 20:55:01	ESCAPADE mission will study Mars' magnetosphere. Part of NASA's Small Innovative Missions for Planetary Exploration (SIMPLEx) program. Second National Security Space Launch demonstration flight for New Glenn. ViaSat InRange Communication demonstrator from ViaSat will be attached to the New Glenn Second Stage. Second Orbital class booster to successfully complete an ASDS and vertical landing of a first stage, after Falcon 9.					
14 November; 03:04:00	(United States) Atlas V 551	AV-100	(United States) Cape Canaveral SLC-41		(United States) ULA	
14 November; 03:04:00	(United States) ViaSat-3 EMEA	ViaSat	Geosynchronous	Communications	In orbit	Operational
14 November; 03:04:00	Last Geostationary launch of Atlas V rocket and for the Atlas rocket family as a whole.					
15 November; 03:08:10	(United States) Falcon 9 Block 5	Starlink Group 6-89	(United States) Kennedy LC-39A		(United States) SpaceX	
15 November; 03:08:10	(United States) Starlink × 29	SpaceX	Low Earth	Communications	In orbit	Operational
15 November; 06:44:20	(United States) Falcon 9 Block 5	Starlink Group 6-85	(United States) Cape Canaveral SLC-40		(United States) SpaceX	
15 November; 06:44:20	(United States) Starlink × 28	SpaceX	Low Earth	Communications	In orbit	Operational
17 November; 05:21:42	(United States) Falcon 9 Block 5	F9-564	(United States) Vandenberg SLC-4E		(United States) SpaceX	
17 November; 05:21:42	(United States) (European Union) Sentinel-6B (Jason-CS B)	NASA / NOAA / EUMETSAT / ESA	Low Earth	Earth observation	In orbit	Operational
17 November; 05:21:42	The 500th successful launch of a flight-proven booster for the Falcon 9.					
19 November; 00:12:20	(United States) Falcon 9 Block 5	Starlink Group 6-94	(United States) Cape Canaveral SLC-40		(United States) SpaceX	
19 November; 00:12:20	(United States) Starlink × 29	SpaceX	Low Earth	Communications	In orbit	Operational
19 November; 04:01:00	(China) Long March 2C	2C-Y?	(China) Jiuquan SLS-2		(China) CASC	
19 November; 04:01:00	(China) Shijian-30A	TBA	Low Earth	TBA	In orbit	Operational
19 November; 04:01:00	(China) Shijian-30B	TBA	Low Earth	TBA	In orbit	Operational
19 November; 04:01:00	(China) Shijian-30C	TBA	Low Earth	TBA	In orbit	Operational
20 November; 12:43:00	(United States) Electron	"Follow My Speed"	(New Zealand) Mahia LC-1B		(United States) Rocket Lab	
20 November; 12:43:00	(United States) BlackSky Global 33 (BlackSky-22)	BlackSky Global	Low Earth	Earth observation	In orbit	Operational
21 November; 03:29:30	(United States) Falcon 9 Block 5	Starlink Group 6-78	(United States) Kennedy LC-39A		(United States) SpaceX	
21 November; 03:29:30	(United States) Starlink × 29	SpaceX	Low Earth	Communications	In orbit	Operational
21 November; 10:55	(China) Long March 3B/E	3B-Y?	(China) Xichang LC-2		(China) CASC	
21 November; 10:55	(China) TJS-21	TBA	Geosynchronous	TBA	In orbit	Operational
22 November; 07:53:50	(United States) Falcon 9 Block 5	Starlink Group 6-79	(United States) Cape Canaveral SLC-40		(United States) SpaceX	
22 November; 07:53:50	(United States) Starlink × 29	SpaceX	Low Earth	Communications	In orbit	Operational
23 November; 08:48:00	(United States) Falcon 9 Block 5	Starlink Group 11-30	(United States) Vandenberg SLC-4E		(United States) SpaceX	
23 November; 08:48:00	(United States) Starlink × 28	SpaceX	Low Earth	Communications	In orbit	Operational
23 November; 08:48:00	First launch of 100th Falcon 9 First Stage Booster named B1100.					
25 November; 04:11:00	(China) Long March 2F/G	2F-Y22	(China) Jiuquan SLS-1		(China) CASC	
25 November; 04:11:00	(China) Shenzhou 22	CMSA	Low Earth (TSS)	TBA	In orbit	Docked to TSS
25 November; 04:11:00	Shenzhou 22 is the replacement spacecraft for Shenzhou 21 crew and will be launched without crew to replace Shenzhou 20 that was damaged by space debris.					
25 November; 13:42:00	(Russia) Angara-1.2		(Russia) Plesetsk Site 35/1		(Russia) RVSN RF	
25 November; 13:42:00	(Russia) Kosmos 2597 (Strela-3M №22)	VKS	Low Earth	TBA	In orbit	Operational
25 November; 13:42:00	(Russia) Kosmos 2598 (Strela-3M №23)	VKS	Low Earth	TBA	In orbit	Operational
25 November; 13:42:00	(Russia) Kosmos 2599 (Strela-3M №24)	VKS	Low Earth	TBA	In orbit	Operational
26 November; 15:54:00	(South Korea) Nuri (KSLV-II)		(South Korea) Naro LC-2		(South Korea) KARI	
26 November; 15:54:00	(South Korea) CAS500-3	KASI / Ministry of Science and ICT	Low Earth (SSO)	Technology demonstration	In orbit	Operational
26 November; 15:54:00	⚀ (South Korea) BEE 1000	Spaceliintech	Low Earth (SSO)	TBA	In orbit	Operational
26 November; 15:54:00	⚀ (South Korea) COSMIC	UZURO Tech	Low Earth (SSO)	TBA	In orbit	Operational
26 November; 15:54:00	⚀ (South Korea) E3T-1	KARI	Low Earth (SSO)	Technology demonstration	In orbit	Operational
26 November; 15:54:00	⚀ (South Korea) ETRISat	ETRI	Low Earth (SSO)	TBA	In orbit	Operational
26 November; 15:54:00	⚀ (South Korea) INHA-roSAT	Inha University	Low Earth (SSO)	TBA	In orbit	Operational
26 November; 15:54:00	⚀ (South Korea) JACK 003, 004	Cosmoworks	Low Earth (SSO)	TBA	In orbit	Operational
26 November; 15:54:00	⚀ (South Korea) K-HERO	KAIST	Low Earth (SSO)	TBA	In orbit	Operational
26 November; 15:54:00	⚀ (South Korea) PERSAT01	Quaternion	Low Earth (SSO)	TBA	In orbit	Operational
26 November; 15:54:00	⚀ (South Korea) Sejong 4	HANCOM InSpace	Low Earth (SSO)	TBA	In orbit	Operational
26 November; 15:54:00	⚀ (South Korea) SNUGLITE-III	Seoul National University	Low Earth (SSO)	TBA	In orbit	Operational
26 November; 15:54:00	⚀ (South Korea) SPIRONE	Sejong University	Low Earth (SSO)	TBA	In orbit	Operational
26 November; 15:54:00	Fourth planned launch of Nuri. Third CAS500 satellite, dedicated to space science and technology verification.					
27 November; 09:27:57	(Russia) Soyuz-2.1a		(Kazakhstan) Baikonur Site 31/6		(Russia) Roscosmos	
27 November; 09:27:57	(Russia) Soyuz MS-28	Roscosmos	Low Earth (ISS)	Expedition 73/74	In orbit	Docked to ISS
27 November; 09:27:57	The Soyuz booster is painted with drawing as an art project between Roscosmos and UNITY Cancer Patient Support Foundation and also the payload fairing is painted celebrating 25th year of continuous crew mission to ISS since the Soyuz TM-31 mission. Exhaust from the rocket damaged and collapsed a support arm at Site 31/6, causing it to collapse, resulting in an indefinite pause in further Soyuz launches from Baikonur. The damage did not impede the launch in any way.					
28 November; 18:44:30	(United States) Falcon 9 Block 5	Transporter-15	(United States) Vandenberg SLC-4E		(United States) SpaceX	
28 November; 18:44:30	(United Kingdom) Azalea Cluster-1 × 3	BAE Systems	Low Earth (SSO)	Reconnaissance	In orbit	Operational
28 November; 18:44:30	(Turkey) FGN-TUG-S01	Fergani Space	Low Earth (SSO)	Space Tug	In orbit	Operational
28 November; 18:44:30	(Taiwan) FORMOSAT-8A	TASA	Low Earth (SSO)	Earth observation	In orbit	Operational
28 November; 18:44:30	HydroGNSS-1 (Earth Scout 2A)	ESA	Low Earth (SSO)	Earth observation	In orbit	Operational
28 November; 18:44:30	HydroGNSS-2 (Earth Scout 2B)	ESA	Low Earth (SSO)	Earth observation	In orbit	Operational
28 November; 18:44:30	(Finland) ICEYE X × 5	ICEYE	Low Earth (SSO)	Earth observation	In orbit	Operational
28 November; 18:44:30	(United States) Impulse 3 (LEO Express-3)	Impulse Space	Low Earth (SSO)	Space Tug	In orbit	Operational
28 November; 18:44:30	(Italy) ION SCV Galactic Giorgius	D-Orbit	Low Earth (SSO)	Space Tug	In orbit	Operational
28 November; 18:44:30	(Italy) ION SCV Stellar Stephanus	D-Orbit	Low Earth (SSO)	Space Tug	In orbit	Operational
28 November; 18:44:30	(Italy) IRIDE-MS1-EAGLET2 × 8	ASI	Low Earth (SSO)	Earth observation	In orbit	Operational
28 November; 18:44:30	(United Kingdom) Mauve	Blue Skies Space	Low Earth (SSO)	Space telescope	In orbit	Operational
28 November; 18:44:30	(United States) Mercury One	Proteus Space	Low Earth (SSO)	Payload Hosting	In orbit	Operational
28 November; 18:44:30	(Belgium) NAHLA	Aerospacelab	Low Earth (SSO)	Earth observation	In orbit	Operational
28 November; 18:44:30	(Argentina) NuSat 47, 51, 52	Satellogic	Low Earth (SSO)	Earth observation	In orbit	Operational
28 November; 18:44:30	(United States) Pelican 5	Planet Labs	Low Earth (SSO)	Earth observation	In orbit	Operational
28 November; 18:44:30	(United States) Pelican 6	Planet Labs	Low Earth (SSO)	Earth observation	In orbit	Operational
28 November; 18:44:30	(Poland) PIAST M, S1, S2	POLSA	Low Earth (SSO)	TBA	In orbit	Operational
28 November; 18:44:30	(United States) Umbra-11	TBA	Low Earth (SSO)	TBA	In orbit	Operational
28 November; 18:44:30	(United States) Winnebago-5	Varda Space Industries	Low Earth (SSO)	Reentry capsule	In orbit	Operational
28 November; 18:44:30	(United States) YAM-9	Loft Orbital	Low Earth (SSO)	Technology demonstration	In orbit	Operational
28 November; 18:44:30	⚀ (United States) 3UCubed-A	University of New Hampshire / Sonoma State University / Howard University	Low Earth (SSO)	Thermosphere studies	In orbit	Operational
28 November; 18:44:30	⚀ (Spain) 6GStarLab	i2CAT	Low Earth (SSO)	Technology demonstration	In orbit	Operational
28 November; 18:44:30	⚀ (United Kingdom) Accenture-1	Open Cosmos	Low Earth (SSO)	Earth observation	In orbit	Operational
28 November; 18:44:30	⚀ (Japan) AE5Ra, b, c	ArkEdge Space	Low Earth (SSO)	Technology demonstration	In orbit	Operational
28 November; 18:44:30	⚀ (Taiwan) Black Kite-1	Rapidtek Technologies	Low Earth (SSO)	IoT	In orbit	Operational
28 November; 18:44:30	⚀ (France) BRO-17, 20	Unseen lab	Low Earth (SSO)	Maritime surveillance	In orbit	Operational
28 November; 18:44:30	⚀ (United States) CTC-1A, B, C	Spacecoin	Low Earth (SSO)	Technology demonstration	In orbit	Operational
28 November; 18:44:30	⚀ (United States) Flock-4h × 36	Planet Labs	Low Earth (SSO)	Earth observation	In orbit	Operational
28 November; 18:44:30	⚀ (Spain) FossaSat 2E × 3 (WISeSat 5. 6, 7)	Fossa Systems	Low Earth (SSO)	TBA	In orbit	Operational
28 November; 18:44:30	⚀ (Germany) GENA-OT	OroraTech, ESA	Low Earth (SSO)	Technology demonstration	In orbit	Operational
28 November; 18:44:30	⚀ (United Arab Emirates) HCT-Sat2	MBRSC	Low Earth (SSO)	TBA	In orbit	Operational
28 November; 18:44:30	⚀ (Japan) IHI-SAT 2	IHI	Low Earth (SSO)	Earth observation	In orbit	Operational
28 November; 18:44:30	⚀ (United States) Lemur-2 × 11	Spire Global	Low Earth (SSO)	TBA	In orbit	Operational
28 November; 18:44:30	⚀ (Taiwan) Lilium 2, 3	National Cheng Kung University / National Taiwan University / NTUST / Tamkang University	Low Earth (SSO)	Educational	In orbit	Operational
28 November; 18:44:30	⚀ (Turkey) LUNA 1	Aselsan	Low Earth (SSO)	IoT	In orbit	Operational
28 November; 18:44:30	⚀ (Greece) MICE-1	Prisma Electronics	Low Earth (SSO)	Maritime tracking	In orbit	Operational
28 November; 18:44:30	⚀ (South Korea) Observer-1 B (GyeonggiSat-1)	Nara Space Technology	Low Earth (SSO)	Earth observation	In orbit	Operational
28 November; 18:44:30	⚀ (Germany) OTTER	German Orbital Systems	Low Earth (SSO)	Technology demonstration	In orbit	Operational
28 November; 18:44:30	⚀ (Greece) PHASMA A / B (LAMARR / DIRAC)	Libre Space Foundation, ESA	Low Earth (SSO)	Electromagnetic spectrum monitoring	In orbit	Operational
28 November; 18:44:30	⚀ (United Arab Emirates) PHI 1	MBRSC	Low Earth (SSO)	Payload Hosting	In orbit	Operational
28 November; 18:44:30	⚀ (Poland) PW-6U	SatRev	Low Earth (SSO)	Earth observation	In orbit	Operational
28 November; 18:44:30	⚀ (United States) R5-S7	NASA	Low Earth (SSO)	Technology demonstration	28 November 2025	Successful
28 November; 18:44:30	⚀ (United Kingdom) (Singapore) SpeQtre	RAL Space / SpeQtral	Low Earth (SSO)	Technology demonstration	In orbit	Operational
28 November; 18:44:30	⚀ (Germany) SPiN 2	SPiN - Space Products and Innovation	Low Earth (SSO)	Payload Hosting	In orbit	Operational
28 November; 18:44:30	⚀ (Taiwan) T.Microsat-1 (Bellbird-1, Zhongque-1)	Tron Future Tech	Low Earth (SSO)	Communication	In orbit	Operational
28 November; 18:44:30	⚀ (Taiwan) TORO 2	Pyras Technology	Low Earth (SSO)	Earth observation / IoT	In orbit	Operational
28 November; 18:44:30	⚀ (United States) TRYAD-1, 2	University of Alabama / Auburn University	Low Earth (SSO)	Gamma Ray Research	In orbit	Operational
28 November; 18:44:30	⚀ (United States) Veery-OG	Care Weather	Low Earth (SSO)	Technology demonstration	In orbit	Operational
28 November; 18:44:30	⚀ (Hungary) WISDOM A, B	C3S	Low Earth (SSO)	Technology demonstration	In orbit	Operational
28 November; 18:44:30	▫ (Azerbaijan) ANISCSAT	Azercosmos	Low Earth (SSO)	Educational	In orbit	Operational
28 November; 18:44:30	▫ (Hungary) NMHH-1 (HUNITY)	BME	Low Earth (SSO)	Amateur Radio / Educational	In orbit	Operational
28 November; 18:44:30	▫ (Saudi Arabia) SARI 1,2	Prince Sultan University / Umm al-Qura University / SSA	Low Earth (SSO)	Educational	In orbit	Operational
28 November; 18:44:30	Dedicated SmallSat Rideshare mission to sun-synchronous orbit, designated Transporter-15.					
30 November; 12:20	(China) Long March 7A	7A-Y10	(China) Wenchang LC-2		(China) CASC	
30 November; 12:20	(China) Shijian-28	TBA	Geosynchronous	TBA	In orbit	Operational

- ← Jan
- Feb
- Mar
- Apr
- May
- Jun
- Jul
- Aug
- Sep
- Oct
- Nov
- Dec →

=== December ===
Date and time (UTC)	Rocket	Flight number	Launch site		LSP	
Date and time (UTC)	Payload (⚀ = CubeSat)	Operator	Orbit	Function	Decay (UTC)	Outcome
Date and time (UTC)	Remarks					
1 December; 07:44:10	(United States) Falcon 9 Block 5	Starlink Group 6-86	(United States) Kennedy LC-39A		(United States) SpaceX	
1 December; 07:44:10	(United States) Starlink × 29	SpaceX	Low Earth	Communications	In orbit	Operational
1 December; 17:21:00	(Italy) Vega-C	VV28	(France) Kourou ELV		(France) Arianespace	
1 December; 17:21:00	(South Korea) KOMPSAT-7 (Arirang 7)	KARI	Low Earth (SSO)	Earth observation	In orbit	Operational
1 December; 17:21:00	Follow-on to KOMPSAT-3A.					
2 December; 02:10:00	(United States) Falcon 9 Block 5	Starlink Group 15-10	(United States) Vandenberg SLC-4E		(United States) SpaceX	
2 December; 02:10:00	(United States) Starlink × 27	SpaceX	Low Earth	Communications	In orbit	Operational
2 December; 22:18:50	(United States) Falcon 9 Block 5	Starlink Group 6-95	(United States) Cape Canaveral SLC-40		(United States) SpaceX	
2 December; 22:18:50	(United States) Starlink × 29	SpaceX	Low Earth	Communications	In orbit	Operational
3 December; 04:00	(China) Zhuque-3	Y1	(China) Jiuquan LS-96		(China) LandSpace	
3 December; 04:00	(China) No Payload	LandSpace	Low Earth	Flight test	3 December	Successful
3 December; 04:00	Maiden flight of the Zhuque-3 orbital launch vehicle.					
4 December; 20:42:20	(United States) Falcon 9 Block 5	Starlink Group 11-25	(United States) Vandenberg SLC-4E		(United States) SpaceX	
4 December; 20:42:20	(United States) Starlink × 28	SpaceX	Low Earth	Communications	In orbit	Operational
5 December; 09:00	(China) Kuaizhou-1A Pro	Y?	(China) Jiuquan LS-95A		(China) ExPace	
5 December; 09:00	(China) Jiaotong VDES A	TBA	Low Earth	TBA	In orbit	Operational
5 December; 09:00	(China) Jiaotong VDES B	TBA	Low Earth	TBA	In orbit	Operational
5 December; 09:00	First Kuaizhou-1A Pro launch from Jiuquan.					
6 December; 08:00	(China) Long March 8A	8A-Y5 / SatNet LEO Group 14	(China) Wenchang Commercial LC-1		(China) CASC	
6 December; 08:00	(China) Guowang × 9	CAST	Low Earth	Communications	In orbit	Operational
7 December; 17:58:00	(United States) Falcon 9 Block 5	Starlink Group 11-15	(United States) Vandenberg SLC-4E		(United States) SpaceX	
7 December; 17:58:00	(United States) Starlink × 28	SpaceX	Low Earth	Communications	In orbit	Operational
8 December; 22:11:00	(China) Long March 6A	6A-Y15/SatNet LEO Group 15	(China) Taiyuan LA-9A		(China) CASC	
8 December; 22:11:00	(China) Guowang × 5	CAST	Low Earth	Communications	In orbit	Operational
8 December; 22:26:10	(United States) Falcon 9 Block 5	Starlink Group 6-92	(United States) Kennedy LC-39A		(United States) SpaceX	
8 December; 22:26:10	(United States) Starlink × 29	SpaceX	Low Earth	Communications	In orbit	Operational
8 December; 22:26:10	Falcon 9 First Stage Booster (B1067) became the first booster to launch 32 missions.					
9 December; 03:41:00	(China) Long March 4B	4B-Y?	(China) Jiuquan SLS-2		(China) CASC	
9 December; 03:41:00	(China) Yaogan-47	TBA	Low Earth	TBA	In orbit	Operational
9 December; 15:08:00	(China) Long March 3B/E	3B-Y119	(China) Xichang LC-2		(China) CASC	
9 December; 15:08:00	(China) TJS-22	TBA	Geosynchronous	TBA	In orbit	Operational
9 December; 19:16:00	(United States) Falcon 9 Block 5	F9-577	(United States) Cape Canaveral SLC-40		(United States) SpaceX	
9 December; 19:16:00	(United States) USA-570 (Intruder F/O-3)	NRO	Low Earth	TBA	In orbit	Operational
9 December; 19:16:00	NROL-77 Mission					
10 December; 04:00:00	(China) Kinetica 1	Y11	(China) Jiuquan		(China) CAS Space	
10 December; 04:00:00	(United Arab Emirates) Arab Satellite 813 (Alianqiu 813)	MBRSC	Low Earth	Earth observation	In orbit	Operational
10 December; 04:00:00	(China) Jilin-1 Gaofen-07B-01 - 07D-01	Chang Guang Satellite Technology	Low Earth	Earth observation	In orbit	Operational
10 December; 04:00:00	(China) Dongpo-15 (Dongpo Zhiyan)	TBA	Low Earth	TBA	In orbit	Operational
10 December; 04:00:00	(China) Yixing-2 09	TBA	Low Earth	TBA	In orbit	Operational
10 December; 04:00:00	(China) Yixian-A	TBA	Low Earth	TBA	In orbit	Operational
10 December; 04:00:00	⚀ (Egypt) SPNeX	EgSA	Low Earth	Technology demonstration	In orbit	Operational
10 December; 04:00:00	⚀ (Nepal) Slipper2Sat	TBA	Low Earth	TBA	In orbit	Operational
10 December; 11:40:30	(United States) Falcon 9 Block 5	Starlink Group 15-11	(United States) Vandenberg SLC-4E		(United States) SpaceX	
10 December; 11:40:30	(United States) Starlink × 27	SpaceX	Low Earth	Communications	In orbit	Operational
11 December; 22:01:20	(United States) Falcon 9 Block 5	Starlink Group 6-90	(United States) Cape Canaveral SLC-40		(United States) SpaceX	
11 December; 22:01:20	(United States) Starlink × 29	SpaceX	Low Earth	Communications	In orbit	Operational
11 December; 23:00:00	(China) Long March 12	Y4/SatNet LEO Group 16	(China) Wenchang LC-2		(China) CASC	
11 December; 23:00:00	(China) Guowang × 9	CAST	Low Earth	Communications	In orbit	Operational
13 December; 01:05:00	(China) Kuaizhou 11	Y8	(China) Jiuquan		(China) ExPace	
13 December; 01:05:00	(China) DEAR-5	AZSpace	Low Earth (Polar)	Communications	In orbit	Operational
13 December; 01:05:00	(China) XiWang 5-2 (Hope 5-2)	TBA	Low Earth (Polar)	TBA	In orbit	Operational
13 December; 01:05:00	A brand new wide fairing was used on this launch.					
14 December; 03:09:00	(United States) Electron	"RAISE And Shine"	(New Zealand) Mahia LC-1B		(United States) Rocket Lab	
14 December; 03:09:00	(Japan) RAISE-4	JAXA	Low Earth (SSO)	Technology demonstration	In orbit	Operational
14 December; 03:09:00	RAISE-4 is a part of the Innovative Satellite Technology Demonstration-4 mission.					
14 December; 05:49:00	(United States) Falcon 9 Block 5	Starlink Group 15-12	(United States) Vandenberg SLC-4E		(United States) SpaceX	
14 December; 05:49:00	(United States) Starlink × 27	SpaceX	Low Earth	Communications	In orbit	Operational
15 December; 05:25:10	(United States) Falcon 9 Block 5	Starlink Group 6-82	(United States) Cape Canaveral SLC-40		(United States) SpaceX	
15 December; 05:25:10	(United States) Starlink × 29	SpaceX	Low Earth	Communications	In orbit	Operational
16 December; 03:17:00	(China) Long March 4B	4B-Y61	(China) Taiyuan LA-9		(China) CASC	
16 December; 03:17:00	(China) Ziyuan-III 04	SASMAC	Low Earth	Earth Observation	In orbit	Operational
16 December; 08:28:00	(United States) Atlas V 551	LA-04/Leo-4	(United States) Cape Canaveral SLC-41		(United States) ULA	
16 December; 08:28:00	(United States) KuiperSat × 27	Amazon Leo	Low Earth	Communications	In orbit	Operational
16 December; 08:28:00	Fifth of nine Amazon Leo (formerly Project Kuiper) launches on Atlas V.					
17 December; 05:01:58	(France) Ariane 62	VA266	(France) Kourou ELA-4		(France) Arianespace	
17 December; 05:01:58	Galileo FOC FM33	ESA	Medium Earth	Navigation	In orbit	Operational
17 December; 05:01:58	Galileo FOC FM34	ESA	Medium Earth	Navigation	In orbit	Operational
17 December; 12:42:10	(United States) Falcon 9 Block 5	Starlink Group 6-99	(United States) Kennedy LC-39A		(United States) SpaceX	
17 December; 12:42:10	(United States) Starlink × 29	SpaceX	Low Earth	Communications	In orbit	Operational
17 December; 15:27:50	(United States) Falcon 9 Block 5	Starlink Group 15-13	(United States) Vandenberg SLC-4E		(United States) SpaceX	
17 December; 15:27:50	(United States) Starlink × 27	SpaceX	Low Earth	Communications	In orbit	Operational
18 December; 05:03:00	(United States) Electron	"Don't Be Such A Square"	(United States) MARS LC-2		(United States) Rocket Lab	
18 December; 05:03:00	(United States) DiskSat × 4	U.S. Space Force	Low Earth	Technology demonstration	In orbit	Operational
18 December; 05:03:00	STP-S30 Mission.					
20 December; 12:30	(China) Long March 5	Y10	(China) Wenchang LC-1		(China) CASC	
20 December; 12:30	(China) TJS-23	TBA	Geosynchronous	TBA	In orbit	Operational
21 December; 06:36:00	(United States) Electron	"The Wisdom God Guides"	(New Zealand) Mahia LC-1B		(United States) Rocket Lab	
21 December; 06:36:00	(Japan) QPS-SAR-15 (SUKUNAMI-I)	iQPS	Low Earth	Earth observation	In orbit	Operational
22 December; 01:51:30	(Japan) H3-22S	F8	(Japan) Tanegashima LA-Y2		(Japan) JAXA	
22 December; 01:51:30	(Japan) QZS-5 (Michibiki-5)	CAO	Tundra	Navigation	22 December 2025	Launch Failure
23 December; 01:13:00	(South Korea) Hanbit-Nano	"SPACEWARD"	(Brazil) Alcântara		(South Korea) Innospace	
23 December; 01:13:00	⚀ (Brazil) FloripaSat-2A / 2B	AEB / UFSC	Low Earth	Technology demonstration	22 December 2025	Launch Failure
23 December; 01:13:00	⚀ (Brazil) Jussara-K	UFMA	Low Earth	Technology demonstration	22 December 2025	Launch Failure
23 December; 01:13:00	⚀ (Brazil) PION-BR2	PION Labs	Low Earth	Educational	22 December 2025	Launch Failure
23 December; 01:13:00	⚀ (India) Solaras S2	Grahaa Space	Low Earth	Earth observation	22 December 2025	Launch Failure
23 December; 01:13:00	First private orbital launch from Alcântara. Maiden flight of Hanbit-Nano.					
23 December; 02:00:00	(China) Long March 12A	12A-Y1	(China) Jiuquan		(China) CASC	
23 December; 02:00:00	(China) TBA	TBA	Low Earth	TBA	23 December	Successful
23 December; 02:00:00	Maiden flight of the Long March 12A.					
24 December; 03:25:30	(India) LVM3	M6	(India) Satish Dhawan SLP		(India) ISRO	
24 December; 03:25:30	(United States) BlueBird-6 (BlueBird Block 2 FM1)	AST SpaceMobile	Low Earth	Communications	In orbit	Operational
24 December; 03:25:30	First BlueBird Block 2 Satellite. 100th launch planned to be done by ISRO, including 4 SLV-3, 4 ASLV, 63 PSLV, 18 GSLV, 8 LVM3 and 3 SSLV. Heaviest payload launched by LVM3.					
25 December; 14:11:00	(Russia) Soyuz-2.1a / Fregat-M		(Russia) Plesetsk Site 43		(Russia) Roscosmos	
25 December; 14:11:00	(Russia) Obzor-R №1	Roscosmos	Low Earth (SSO)	Earth observation	In orbit	Operational
25 December; 23:25:00	(China) Long March 8A	8A-Y6 / SatNet LEO Group 17	(China) Wenchang Commercial LC-1		(China) CASC	
25 December; 23:25:00	(China) Guowang × 9	CAST	Low Earth	Communications	In orbit	Operational
26 December; 16:05:00	(China) Long March 3B/E		(China) Xichang LC-2		(China) CASC	
26 December; 16:05:00	(China) Fengyun-4C	CMA	Geosynchronous	Meteorology	In orbit	Operational
28 December; 13:18:05	(Russia) Soyuz-2.1b / Fregat-M		(Russia) Vostochny Site 1S		(Russia) Roscosmos	
28 December; 13:18:05	(Russia) Aist-2T №1	Roscosmos	Low Earth (SSO)	Earth observation	In orbit	Operational
28 December; 13:18:05	(Russia) Aist-2T №2	Roscosmos	Low Earth (SSO)	Earth observation	In orbit	Operational
28 December; 13:18:05	(Iran) Kowsar-1.5	ISA	Low Earth (SSO)	Reconnaissance	In orbit	Operational
28 December; 13:18:05	(Russia) Marafon №1	Roscosmos	Low Earth (SSO)	IoT	In orbit	Operational
28 December; 13:18:05	(Russia) Marafon №2	Roscosmos	Low Earth (SSO)	IoT	In orbit	Operational
28 December; 13:18:05	(Iran) Paya	TBA	Low Earth (SSO)	TBA	In orbit	Operational
28 December; 13:18:05	(Iran) Zafar-2	IUST	Low Earth (SSO)	Earth observation	In orbit	Operational
28 December; 13:18:05	⚀ (Russia) Aist-ST	Roscosmos	Low Earth (SSO)	Earth observation	In orbit	Operational
28 December; 13:18:05	⚀ (Russia) Avion-2	Amur State University	Low Earth (SSO)	TBA	In orbit	Operational
28 December; 13:18:05	⚀ (Russia) Cholbon	Sakha Science Academy / Sputnix	Low Earth (SSO)	Educational / Amateur Radio	In orbit	Operational
28 December; 13:18:05	⚀ (Russia) CSTP-3.1	STC	Low Earth (SSO)	TBA	In orbit	Operational
28 December; 13:18:05	⚀ (Russia) CSTP × 4	STC	Low Earth (SSO)	TBA	In orbit	Operational
28 December; 13:18:05	⚀ (Russia) DCS-1	Sputnix	Low Earth (SSO)	TBA	In orbit	Operational
28 December; 13:18:05	⚀ (Russia) Grifon × 4	TBA	Low Earth (SSO)	TBA	In orbit	Operational
28 December; 13:18:05	⚀ (Russia) Kaysant	TBA	Low Earth (SSO)	TBA	In orbit	Operational
28 December; 13:18:05	⚀ (Russia) Khors 5	IKI RAN	Low Earth (SSO)	Technology demonstration	In orbit	Operational
28 December; 13:18:05	⚀ (Russia) Lobachevsky	UNN, Lobachevsky University	Low Earth (SSO)	TBA	In orbit	Operational
28 December; 13:18:05	⚀ (Montenegro) Luča	Montenegro Space Research	Low Earth (SSO)	Technology demonstration	In orbit	Operational
28 December; 13:18:05	⚀ (Russia) MorSat	TBA	Low Earth (SSO)	TBA	In orbit	Operational
28 December; 13:18:05	⚀ (Belarus) NASABSAT-1, 2	TBA	Low Earth (SSO)	TBA	In orbit	Operational
28 December; 13:18:05	⚀ (Russia) Polytech Universe-6	SPbPU	Low Earth (SSO)	Remote sensing	In orbit	Operational
28 December; 13:18:05	⚀ (Kuwait) (Russia) QMR-KWT-2	MTUCI / Orbital Space / Sputnix	Low Earth (SSO)	Educational / Amateur Radio	In orbit	Operational
28 December; 13:18:05	⚀ (Russia) RUVDSSat-1	TBA	Low Earth (SSO)	TBA	In orbit	Operational
28 December; 13:18:05	⚀ (Russia) SamSat-ORION (SamSat-Mayak)	Samara University	Low Earth (SSO)	TBA	In orbit	Operational
28 December; 13:18:05	⚀ (Russia) Scorpio	TBA	Low Earth (SSO)	TBA	In orbit	Operational
28 December; 13:18:05	⚀ (Russia) SITRO-AIS × 9	Sitronics Group	Low Earth (SSO)	AIS ship tracking	In orbit	Operational
28 December; 13:18:05	⚀ (Russia) SITRO-TD × 2	Sitronics Group	Low Earth (SSO)	Technology demonstration	In orbit	Operational
28 December; 13:18:05	⚀ (Russia) Vladivostok-2	TBA	Low Earth (SSO)	TBA	In orbit	Operational
28 December; 13:18:05	⚀ (Russia) Zorkiy-2M-3, 5, 7	Sputnix	Low Earth (SSO)	Earth observation	In orbit	Operational
28 December; 13:18:05	▫ (Russia) Trisat × 3	TBA	Low Earth (SSO)	TBA	In orbit	Operational
28 December; 13:18:05	GK Launch Services Rideshare Mission. Marafon-D are demonstrator satellite for the Sfera constellation. Luča is the first satellite launched that is operated by Montenegro.					
30 December; 04:12:00	(China) Long March 4B	4B-Y69	(China) Jiuquan SLS-2		(China) CASC	
30 December; 04:12:00	(China) Tianhui 7	TBA	Low Earth (SSO)	TBA	In orbit	Operational
30 December; 22:40:00	(China) Long March 7A	7A-Y7	(China) Wenchang LC-2		(China) CASC	
30 December; 22:40:00	(China) Shijian 29A	TBA	Geosynchronous	TBA	In orbit	Operational
30 December; 22:40:00	(China) Shijian 29B	TBA	Geosynchronous	TBA	In orbit	Operational

- ← Jan
- Feb
- Mar
- Apr
- May
- Jun
- Jul
- Aug
- Sep
- Oct
- Nov
- Dec →

== Suborbital flights ==
Date and time (UTC)	Rocket	Flight number	Launch site		LSP	
Date and time (UTC)	Payload (⚀ = CubeSat)	Operator	Orbit	Function	Decay (UTC)	Outcome
Date and time (UTC)	Remarks					
1 October; 00:28	(United States) HASTE	JUSTIN	(United States) MARS LC-2		(United States) Rocket Lab	
1 October; 00:28	(United States) JUSTIN	Hypersonix	Suborbital	Technology demonstration	1 October	Successful
1 October; 00:28	Sub-orbital launch under Rocket Lab’s Hypersonic Accelerator Suborbital Test Electron (HASTE) program.					
6 October; 08:45	(Germany) (Canada) Red Kite/Black Brant IV	ATHEAt	(Norway) Andøya		(Germany) DLR	
6 October; 08:45	(Germany) ATHEAt	(Germany) DLR	Suborbital	Technology demonstration	6 October	Successful
6 October; 08:45	Apogee: 30 km (19 mi).					
8 October; 13:40	(United States) New Shepard	NS-36	(United States) Corn Ranch		(United States) Blue Origin	
8 October; 13:40	(United States) Blue Origin NS-36	Blue Origin	Suborbital	Space tourism	8 October	Successful
8 October; 13:40	15th crewed New Shepard flight. Crew of six.					
13 October; 23:23:41	(United States) Starship	Flight 11	(United States) Starbase OLP-A		(United States) SpaceX	
13 October; 23:23:41	(United States) Starlink Simulators × 8	SpaceX	Suborbital	Vehicle evaluation	13 October	Successful
13 October; 23:23:41	Eleventh Starship flight test. Last Launch of Starship Block 2 Version of Starship. This should be in the orbital list,as are previous flights.					
22 October	(Russia) RS-24 Yars		(Russia) Plesetsk Cosmodrome		(Russia) Russian Ministry of Defence	
22 October	(Russia)	Russian Ministry of Defence	Suborbital	ICBM test	22 October	Successful
22 October	Hit a target in the Kura Missile Test Range on the Kamchatka Peninsula, 6,700 km (4,163 mi) downrange.					
22 October	(Russia) R-29RMU Sineva		(Russia) Submarine Bryansk, Barents Sea		(Russia) Russian Ministry of Defence	
22 October	(Russia)	Russian Ministry of Defence	Suborbital	SLBM test	22 October	Successful
22 October	Hit a target on the Kamchatka Peninsula.					
5 November; 09:35	(United States) Minuteman III	GT-254GM	(United States) Vandenberg LF-09?		(United States) AFGSC	
5 November; 09:35	(United States)	AFGSC	Suborbital	Test flight	5 November	Successful
5 November; 09:35	Re-entered ~4,200 mi (6,800 km) downrange near Kwajalein Atoll.					
12 November; 04:05	(Germany) Red Kite	MAPHEUS-16	(Sweden) Esrange		(Germany) MORABA	
12 November; 04:05	⚀ (Germany) 1U-Sized Experiments × 21	DLR	Suborbital	Microgravity research	12 November	Successful
12 November; 04:05	Apogee: 260 km (160 mi). First time DLR combined two Red Kite rocket motors for a launch. New payload record for this rocket: 500 kilograms lifted into microgravity.					
17 November; 17:46	(United States) Improved Malemute	ORIGIN II	(Sweden) Esrange		(Germany) MORABA	
17 November; 17:46	(Sweden) ORIGIN	KTH	Suborbital	Nightglow observation	17 November	Successful
17 November; 17:46	Second flight of the ORIGIN launch campaign.					
18 November; 10:06	(United States) Terrier-Improved Malemute		(Norway) Andøya		(United States) NASA	
18 November; 10:06	(United States) (Norway) GHOST	Wallops Flight Facility Andøya Space	Suborbital	Education	18 November	Successful
18 November; 10:06	Grand cHallenge MesOsphere Student rockeT (GHOST).					
18 November; 13:00	(United States) HASTE	VAN (Prometheus Run)	(United States) MARS LC-2		(United States) Rocket Lab	
18 November; 13:00	(United States) VAN (Prometheus Run)	Hypersonix	Suborbital	Technology demonstration	18 November	Successful
18 November; 13:00	Sub-orbital launch under Rocket Lab’s Hypersonic Accelerator Suborbital Test Electron (HASTE) program.					
19 November; 14:00	(United States) SpaceLoft XL	SL-18	(United States) Spaceport America		(United States) UP Aerospace	
19 November; 14:00	(United States) LANL	Los Alamos National Laboratory	Suborbital	Technology demonstration	19 November	Successful
19 November; 14:00	Carried a Los Alamos National Laboratory (LANL) payload to an apogee of roughly of 116 km (72 mi).					
20 November; 16:54	(Netherlands) T-Minus Barracuda		(Canada) Spaceport Nova Scotia		(Canada) Maritime Launch Services	
20 November; 16:54	Stories and an artwork	STORIES of Space	Suborbital	Education and scientific testing	20 november	Partial Launch Failure
20 November; 16:54	Launched, but did not reached desired altitude.					
22 November	(Poland) PERUN	F3	(Poland) Central Air Force Training Range, Ustka		(Poland) SpaceForest	
22 November	(Poland) ThOR	AGH University of Kraków - AstroBio AGH	Suborbital	Microgravity research	22 November	Partial Launch Failure
22 November	(Poland) RESQ	Wojskowy Instytut Medycyny Lotniczej	Suborbital	Microgravity research	22 November	Partial Launch Failure
22 November	(Poland) PLUTONIC Receiver	Blue Dot Solutions	Suborbital	Microgravity research	22 November	Partial Launch Failure
22 November	(Poland) AstroBucha SCOBY	AstroFarms	Suborbital	Microgravity research	22 November	Partial Launch Failure
22 November	(Poland) Seeds	TORAF	Suborbital	Microgravity research	22 November	Partial Launch Failure
22 November	(Poland) Electronic components and structural materials	SpaceForest	Suborbital	Technology demonstration	22 November	Partial Launch Failure
22 November	(Poland) Yeast strains	AleBrowar	Suborbital	Microgravity research	22 November	Partial Launch Failure
22 November	(Poland) Music albums × 5	Immortal Onion	Suborbital		22 November	Partial Launch Failure
22 November	Flight interrupted after 33.5s; the rocket reached a maximum altitude of 19.3 km (12.0 mi).					
23 November; 09:52	(Canada) Black Brant XII-A		(Norway) Andøya		(United States) NASA	
23 November; 09:52	(United States) RENU 3	University of New Hampshire	Suborbital	Magnetospheric research	23 November	Successful
23 November; 09:52	Rocket Experiment for Neutral Upwelling (RENU) 3.					
26 November; 22:52	(Australia) A01	A01	(Australia) Koonibba Test Range		(Australia) AtSpace	
26 November; 22:52	(Australia)	AtSpace	Suborbital	Flight Test	26 November	Successful
26 November; 22:52	Apogee: ~80 km (50 mi), the highest reached by an Australian commercial rocket to date.					
28 November	(France) SyLEx Single-stage		(France) DGA Essais de missiles		(France) Direction générale de l'armement	
28 November	(France) Platform for technological integration and demonstration	ArianeGroup	Suborbital	Technology demonstration	28 November	Successful
29 November	(Russia) RS-28 Sarmat		(Russia) Dombarovsky		(Russia) RVSN	
29 November	(Russia)	RVSN	Suborbital	Missile test	29 November	Launch failure
3 December; 06:30	(United States) Terrier-Oriole?		(United States) Wallops Flight Facility		(United States) NASA	
3 December; 06:30	(United States)	MDA?	Suborbital	Technology demonstration	3 December	Successful
20 December; 14:15	(United States) New Shepard	NS-37	(United States) Corn Ranch		(United States) Blue Origin	
20 December; 14:15	(United States) Blue Origin NS-37	Blue Origin	Suborbital	Space tourism	20 December	Successful
20 December; 14:15	16th crewed New Shepard flight. Crew of six.					
23 December	(India) K-4		(India) INS Arighaat		(India) Indian Navy	
23 December	(India)	Indian Navy	Suborbital	Missile test	23 December	Successful
23 December	Apogee: ~500 km (310 mi).					
24 December	(North Korea) Pyoljji SAM?		(North Korea) Near Sea of Japan		(North Korea) Missile Administration	
24 December	(North Korea)		Suborbital	Missile test	24 December	Successful
24 December	Apogee: 200 km (120 mi).					
