= Sentinel-6B =

Earth observation satellite

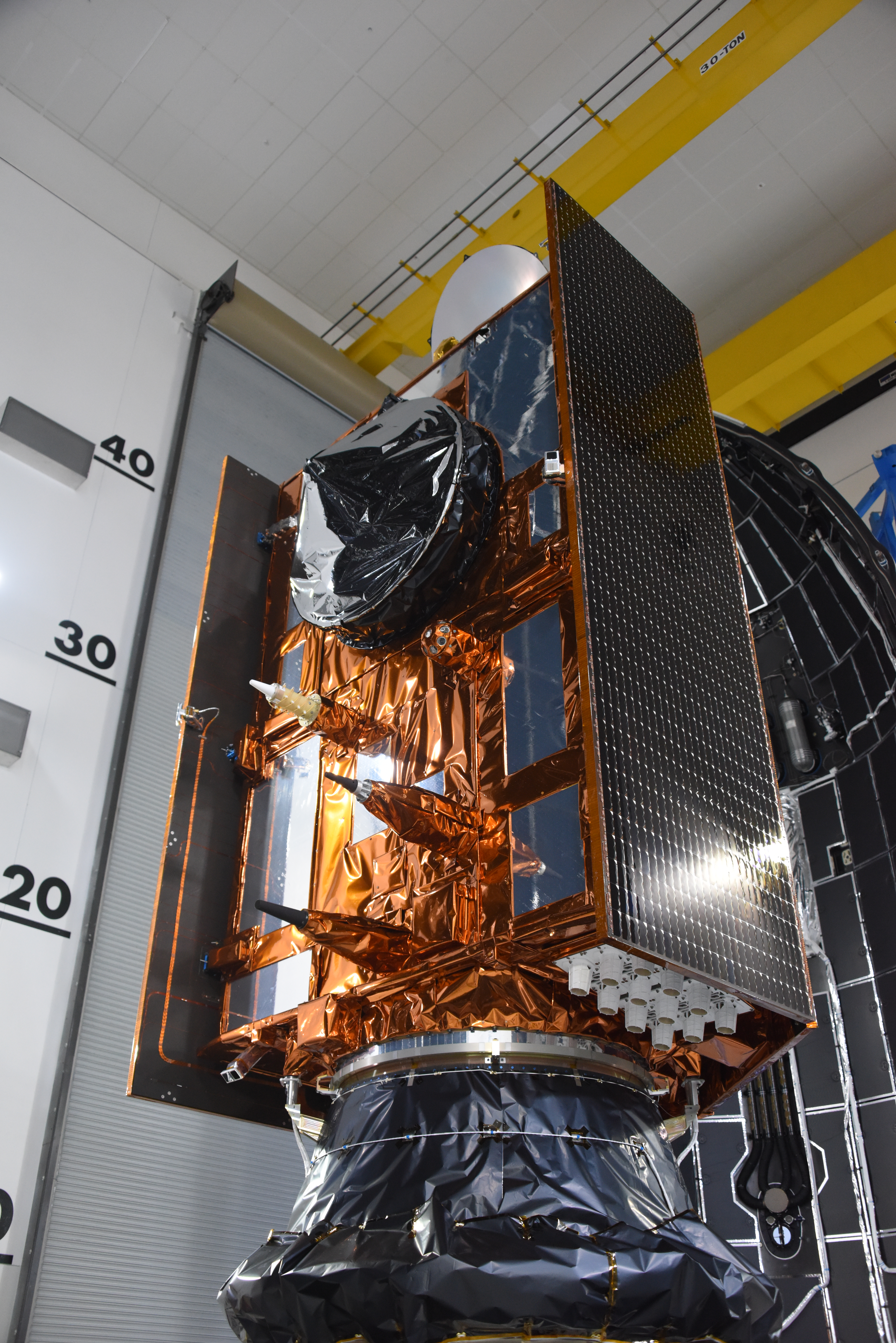
- Sentinel-6B during payload fairing integration
- Names: Sentinel-6B; Jason-CS B
- Mission type: Oceanography
- Operator: CNES, ESA, EUMETSAT, NASA, NOAA
- COSPAR ID: 2025-264A
- SATCAT no.: 66514
- Website: www.eumetsat.int/sentinel-6
- Mission duration: 5.5 years (planned); 9 months, 13 days (in progress)

Spacecraft properties
- Bus: Sentinel-6
- Manufacturer: Airbus Defence and Space
- Launch mass: 1,192 kg (2,628 lb)
- Dimensions: 5.13 × 4.17 × 2.34 m (16.8 × 13.7 × 7.7 ft)
- Power: 891 watts

Start of mission
- Launch date: 17 November 2025, 05:21 UTC
- Rocket: Falcon 9 Block 5 (B1097.3)
- Launch site: Vandenberg, SLC-4E
- Contractor: SpaceX

Orbital parameters
- Reference system: Geocentric orbit
- Regime: Low Earth orbit
- Altitude: 1,336 km (830 mi)
- Inclination: 66.0°
- Repeat interval: 10 days

Instruments
- Radar altimeter; Advanced Microwave Radiometer (AMR-C); GNSS Precise Orbit Determination (POD) Receiver; DORIS Receiver; Laser Reflector Array (LRA); Radio-occultation instrument

Sentinel-6B is a radar altimeter satellite developed in partnership between several European and American organizations. It is part of the Jason satellite series and the Copernicus Programme. S6B includes a synthetic-aperture radar altimetry instrument designed to improve ocean topography measurements, as well as topography of rivers and lakes. The spacecraft is expected to operate for 5.5 years after entering service. The main objective of the Sentinel-6 mission is to measure sea surface topography with high accuracy and reliability to support ocean forecasting systems, environmental monitoring, and climate change monitoring. S6B was launched on a Falcon 9 rocket in November 2025.

== Timeline ==
=== Background ===
Since the launch of TOPEX/Poseidon on 10 August 1992, high-precision satellite altimeters have been essential for monitoring how the ocean stores and redistributes heat, water, and carbon in the climate system. The Sentinel-6 program is a continuation of this series of measurements. First of the identical satellites, Sentinel-6 Michael Freilich, launched on 21 November 2020, and the second, Sentinel-6B, was scheduled to launch 5 years later.

They are designed to extend the legacy of the Jason satellite series satellite altimetry at least through 2030, which will provide a nearly forty-year record of the climate change-caused sea level rise as well as changes in ocean currents. The third satellite, Sentinel-6C, is expected to launch in 2030s.

=== Before launch ===
During 2025, Sentinel-6B underwent a series of checks at IABG in Ottobrunn, Germany and it was later transported by truck to Bremen, Germany. In July 2025, the satellite was transported from Bremen to Galveston, Texas aboard the cargo ship Industrial Dolphin. In late August 2025, the satellite arrived by truck at Vandenberg Space Force Base in California. On 24 September 2025, the satellite was transferred to the Astrotech Space Operations processing facility.

=== Launch campaign ===
By 1 October 2025, the satellite was unpacked from its storage container and prepared for its launch campaign. Meanwhile, at ESOC, the simulation campaign for the satellite's Launch and Early Orbit Phase (LEOP) started on 2 September 2025. The launch was scheduled for 17 November 2025. The spacecraft was encapsulated in its payload fairing on 10 November 2025. On 15 November, it successfully passed its Launch Readiness Review.

The Falcon 9 B1097.3 with Sentinel-6B launched from SLC-4E at Vandenberg Space Force Base at 5:21 UTC on 17 November 2025. This was the third flight of this specific Falcon 9 first stage, which previously flew twice in 2025 on Starlink missions. The first stage successfully landed on Landing Zone 4. The satellite separated from the rocket's second stage just under an hour after liftoff. At 6:54 UTC, ESOC received the first signal from Sentinel-6B via the Inuvik ground station in Canada.

=== In orbit ===
On 20 November 2025, EUMETSAT's Mission Control Centre in Darmstadt has officially taken control of the satellite. The satellite's first data were captured on 26 November 2025 by the Poseidon-4 altimeter. ESA published the data on 16 December 2025 in combination with observations of the same region by Sentinel-6 Michael Freilich.

== Instruments ==
- POSEIDON4, a radar altimeter, developed by ESA, based on the Sentinel-3 SRAL instrument, but with a design adopted to allow an interleaved mode combining a synthetic-aperture radar High-Resolution (HR) mode and a low resolution (LR) mode based on pulse-limited altimetry
- Advanced Microwave Radiometer (AMR-C) provided by NASA
- Global Navigation Satellite System Precise Orbit Determination (GNSS POD) receiver, developed by ESA and derived from the GNSS Receiver on Sentinel-3
- Doppler Orbitography and Radiopositioning Integrated by Satellite (DORIS Receiver), identical to the one used on Jason-3 and Sentinel-3
- Laser Reflector Array (LRA), used for satellite laser ranging, identical to the one used on Jason-3, provided by NASA
- GNSS Radio Occultation (GNSS-RO) based on a Tri-G receiver, provided by NASA

== Partnership ==
Sentinel-6 was developed by European Space Agency (ESA) in the context of the European Copernicus Programme led by the European Commission, the European Organisation for the Exploitation of Meteorological Satellites (EUMETSAT), NASA, and the National Oceanic and Atmospheric Administration (NOAA), with funding support from the European Commission and technical support from France's National Centre for Space Studies (CNES).

The mission definition is driven by the need for continuity in provision of TOPEX/Poseidon mission and Jason satellite series (Jason-1, OSTM/Jason-2, and Jason-3) with improvements in instrument performance and coverage. ESA, NASA, and EUMETSAT provide mission management and system engineering support. EUMETSAT and NASA are responsible for long-term archives of altimetry data products. All partners were involved with the selection of science investigators.

ESA has responsibility for procurement of Sentinel-6B on behalf of EUMETSAT and the European Commission, and for conducting the Launch and Early Orbit Phase (LEOP) of the satellite. ESA also supports flight operations performed by EUMETSAT.

EUMETSAT has responsibility for ground segment development and coordination at system level, including for operations preparation, for conducting operations of the satellite after LEOP performed by ESA, and for conducting operations of the European part of the ground segment, including processing of altimeter data and delivery of product services to European users.

NASA has responsibility for the development and delivery of the U.S. payload instruments, the microwave radiometer and the GNSS radio occultation receiver. NASA also provides launch services for the satellite and ground segment development support. NASA will contribute to operations and data processing on the U.S. side, including processing of GNSS radio occultation data, and together with NOAA, shares responsibility for the distribution of products to research and operational users in the U.S.

NOAA provides a U.S. ground station for tracking and command of the satellite and data downlinks. Togethre with NASA, NOAA shares responsibility for the distribution of products to research and operational users in the U.S.

CNES has responsibility for processing higher-level products (L2P, L3) and for providing precise orbit determination and support for Doris and altimeter operations.

== Gallery ==
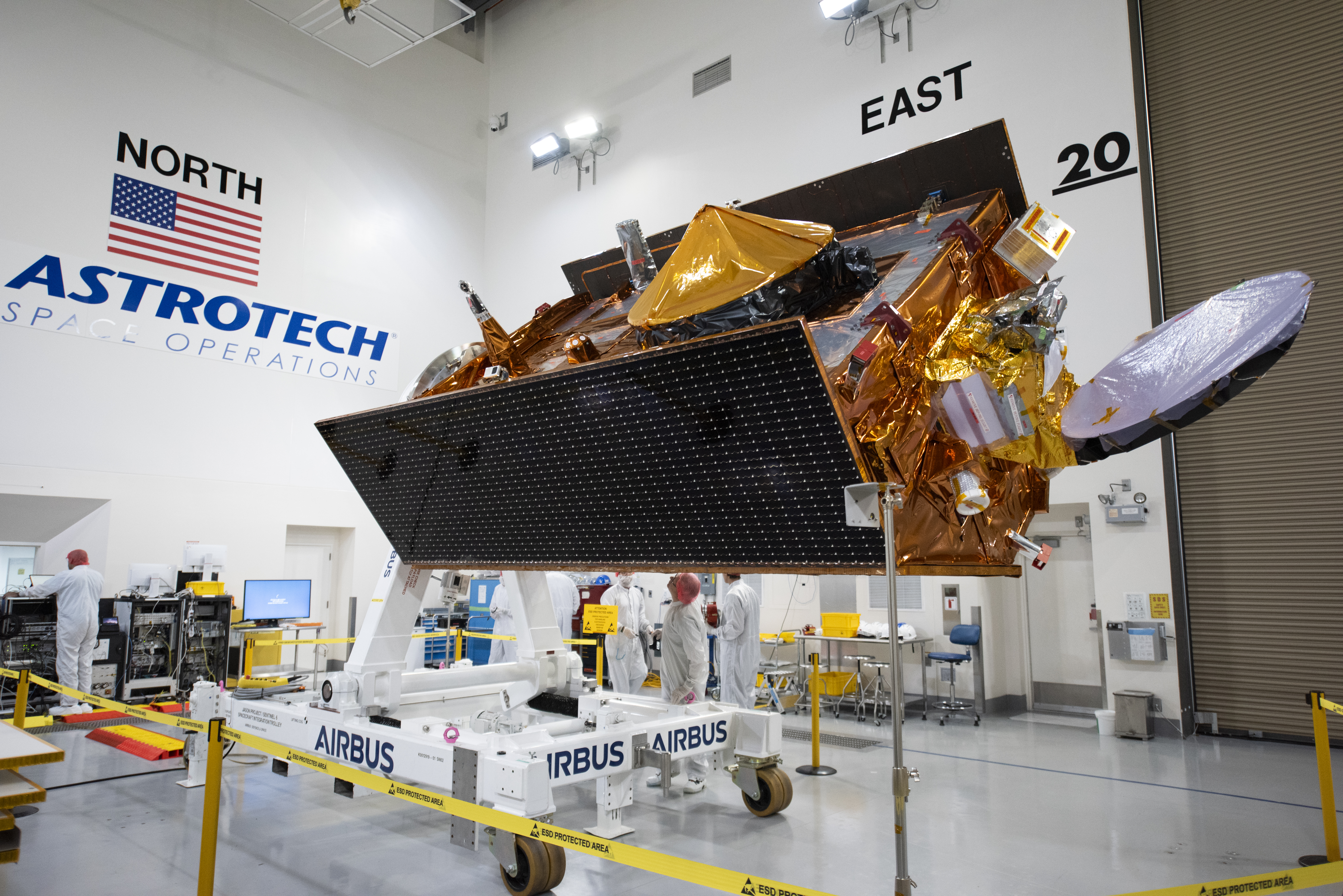
Sentinel-6B transported to the Astrotech processing facility

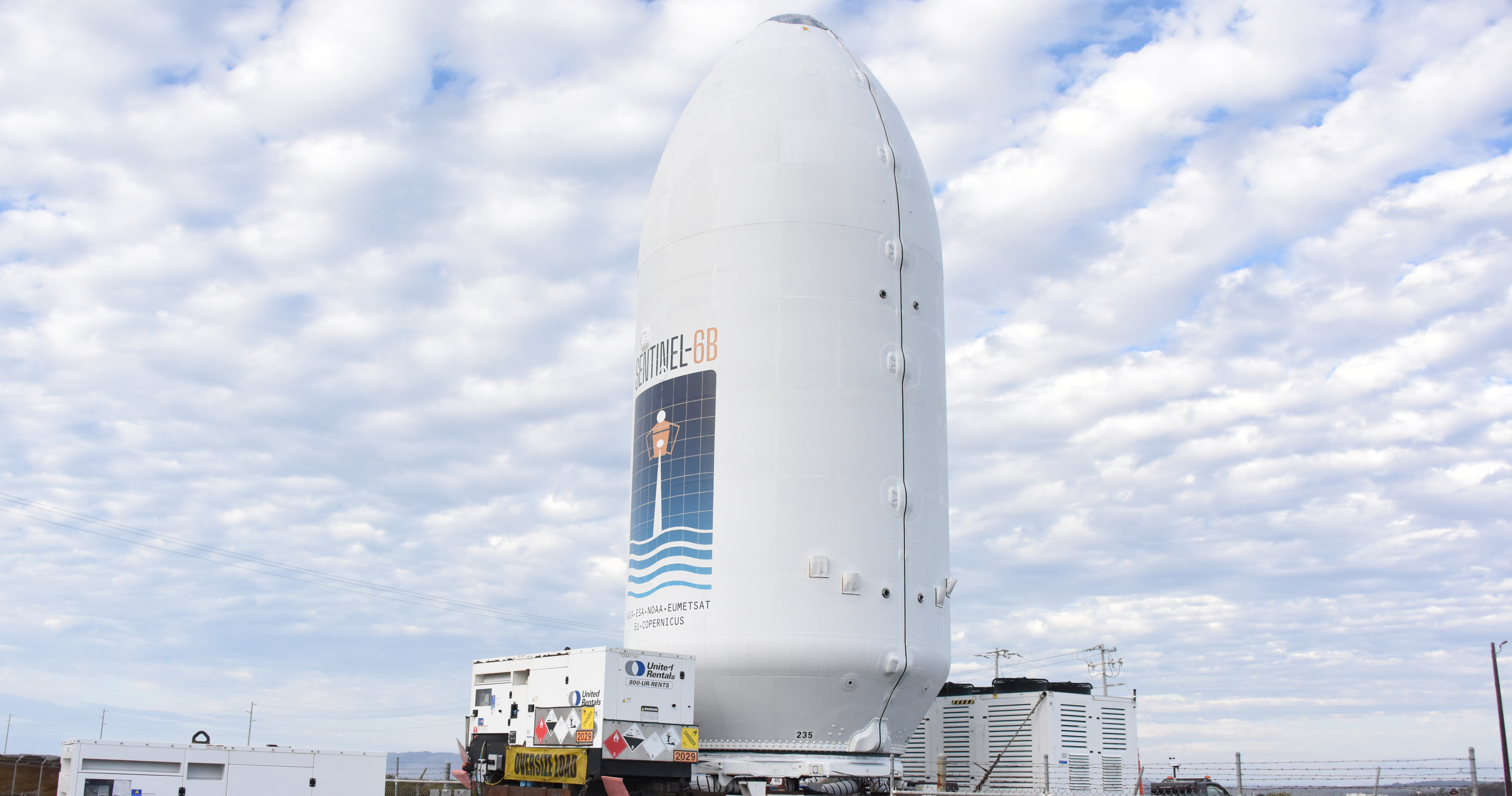
Sentinel-6B rollout and transport from Astrotech to SpaceX hangar

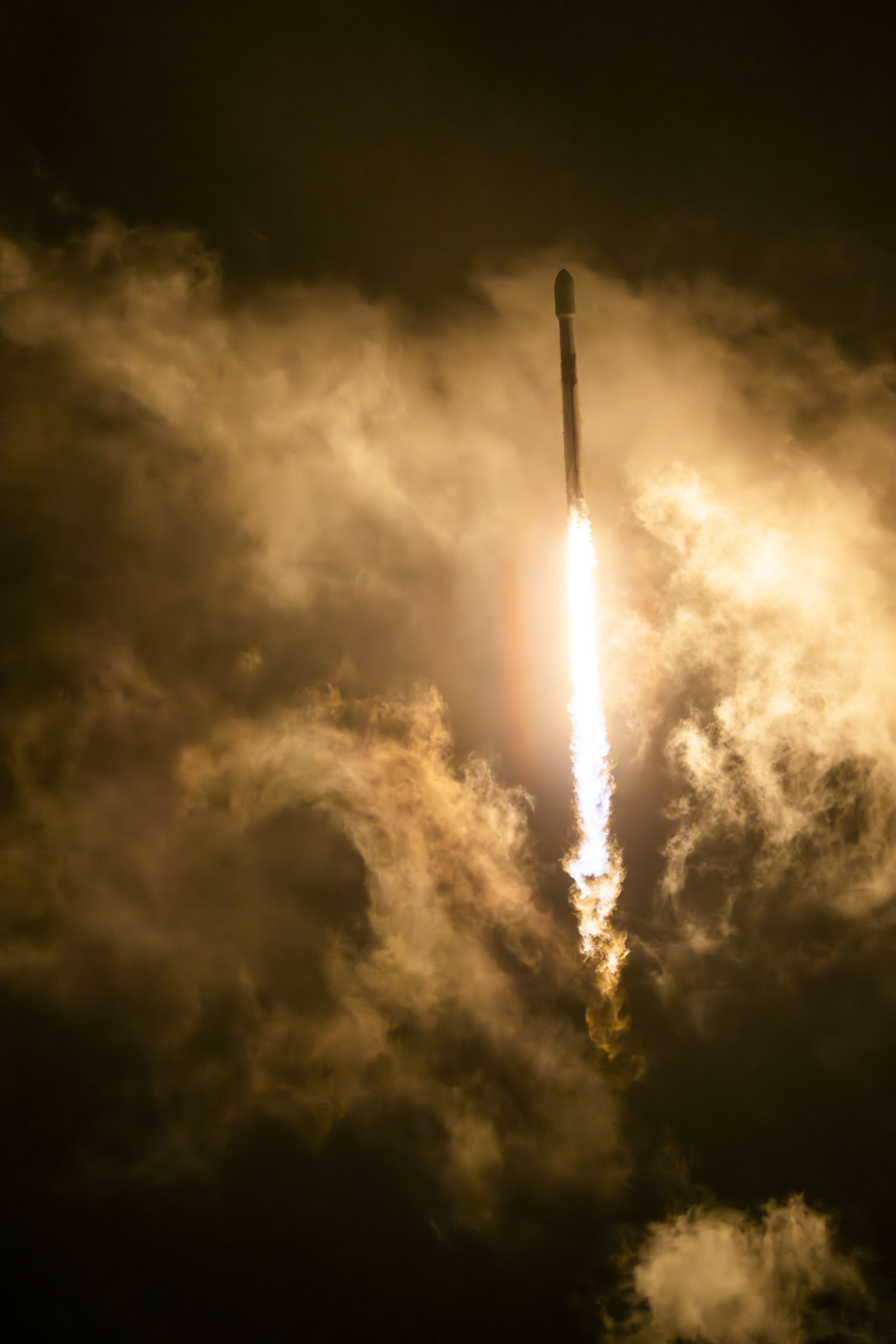
Sentinel-6B launch on Falcon 9

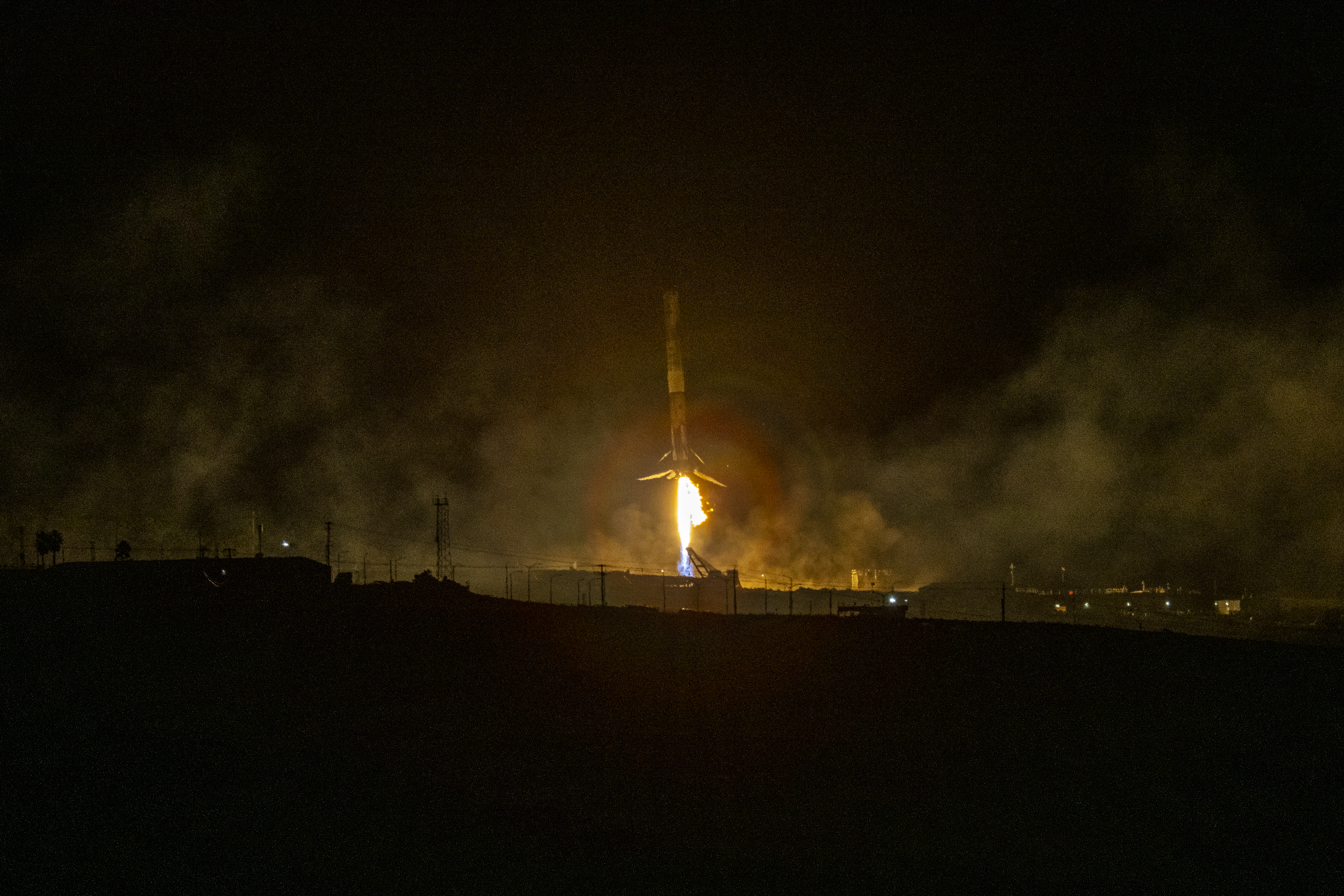
Landing of Falcon 9 first stage after delivering Sentinel-6B

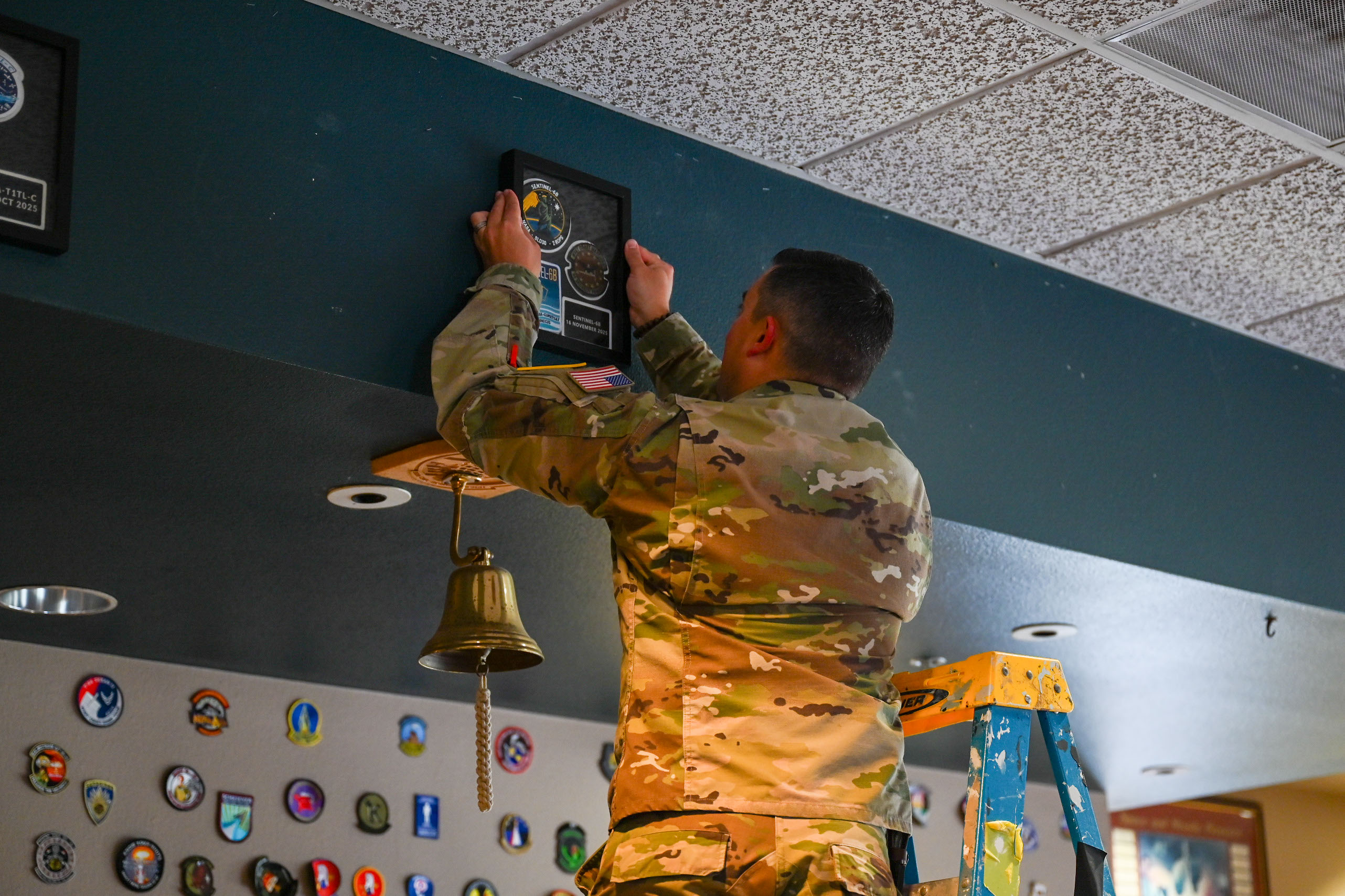
Sentinel-6B patching ceremony

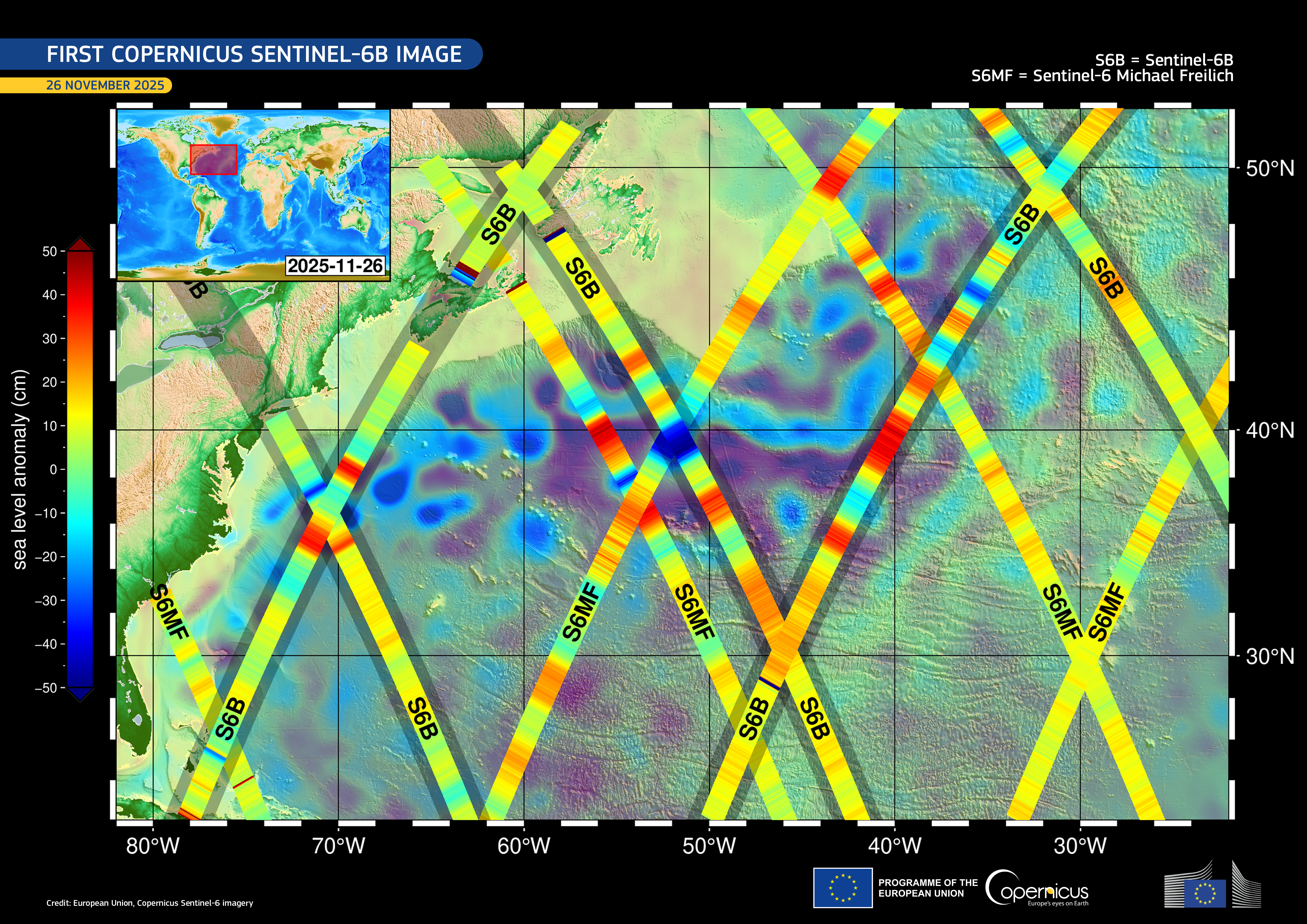
Sentinel-6B delivers its first images

== See also ==
- List of ESA programmes and missions
- List of Earth observation satellites
- List of spaceflight launches in October–December 2025
- 2025 in spaceflight
