= HMU-SAT2 =

- Mission type: Education
- Operator: Hokkaido University of Science
- Website: https://www.nagano-c.ed.jp/komako/teruteru.html

Spacecraft properties
- Spacecraft type: CubeSat

Start of mission
- Launch date: 26 October 2025, 00:00:15 UTC
- Rocket: H3-24W
- Launch site: Tanegashima, LA-Y2
- Deployed from: ISS Kibō; Delivered by HTV-X1

Orbital parameters
- Reference system: Geocentric
- Regime: Low Earth
- Inclination: 51.6°

HMU-SAT2 is a nanosatellite for education and technical demonstration equipped with light-emitting diodes (LEDs) which can flash Morse codes. HMU-SAT2 was jointly developed by the Hokkaido University of Science, Koubou Okura, and the Komagane Technical High School. The satellite is nicknamed Teruteru, a name evoking Teru teru bōzu, Japanese handmade dolls hung to wish for sunny weather. The project hopes that the satellite will shine over people like the Sun.

HMU-SAT2 was launched by a H3 Launch Vehicle, and carried to the International Space Station (ISS) on board the HTV-X1 cargo spacecraft.

== Overview ==
From 2022, Hokkaido University of Science and Komagane Technical High School began to develop HMU-SAT2 with support from Koubou Okura, a metal machining company based in Matsukawa town, Nagano. The satellite will send messages in Morse code using its LEDs. The messages will be visible from the Earth using telescopes, and observation will be conducted from locations including Kiso Observatory, Ishigakijima Astronomical Observatory, and Ginga no Mori Astronomical Observatory in Japan, Mount Stromlo Observatory in Australia, Hilo High School in Hawaii, and Ghana. Senior students from Komagane Technical High School developed HMU-SAT2's LED panel and the programming for the Morse code.

The nickname of the satellite, Teruteru was decided by a contest, and the winning name was suggested by a student in Nagano Senior High School. The name Teruteru represents two wishes. That the satellite will send, or 'tell' messages to Earth, and that the messages will shine (teru in Japanese, spelled as 照る) the hearts of people who received them. A crowdfunding campaign was held to cover the testing and launch cost of the satellite. Rewards included the right to have one's name written in a plate inside HMU-SAT2, and writing senryū poems that will be projected from the satellite's LEDs in Morse code.

== Spacecraft ==
The satellite is a 10 cm size cube, or a 1U size CubeSat, weighing 1.28kg. On one side, the satellite has nine LEDs to enable observation from the ground. The satellite will be activated when it gets deployed from the ISS, and 10 seconds after it powers on, the LEDs will be illuminated to allow visual confirmation that the satellite is active and functioning. HMU-SAT2 carries a total of 82 messages including senryū, that will be projected in Morse code by the satellite using its LEDs. The satellite also stores photographic data of jigsaw puzzles by having it transcribed on metal plates. The jigsaw puzzles have the messages from over a 2,000 people scribbled on its pieces. To collect the messages, Koubou Okura president Masaharu Okura visited various locations, including local schools.

Enb Spaceagent, a Japanese molding company is resonsible for four rotational panels on board HMU-SAT2. The panels are manufactured by welding two materials together: aluminium alloy, and Ultem (polyetherimide) resin. The gear mechanism for the panels are composed of gears manufactured by metal injection molding, and axle pins manufactured by insert molding. The panels will rotate by a combination of rack and pinion mechanism and springs.

== See also ==
- LEOPARD
