= CEVROSAT 1 =

Czech educational satellite

- Operator: CEVRO University
- COSPAR ID: 2025-248M
- Website: www.cevrosat.cz

Start of mission
- Launch date: 2 November 2025
- Rocket: Falcon 9

CEVROSAT 1 is an educational and amateur radio satellite developed by a Czech consortium of CEVRO University, ČVC Electronic, Brno University of Technology, and Mendel University in Brno. The 48-kg microsatellite is designed to perform experiments in space weather monitoring, image processing, and to study radiation effects on electronics, as well as to communicate with radio amateurs and to support education. CEVROSAT 1 was launched to a mid-inclination low earth orbit on the Bandwagon-4 mission of Falcon 9 in November 2025. and operates successfully.

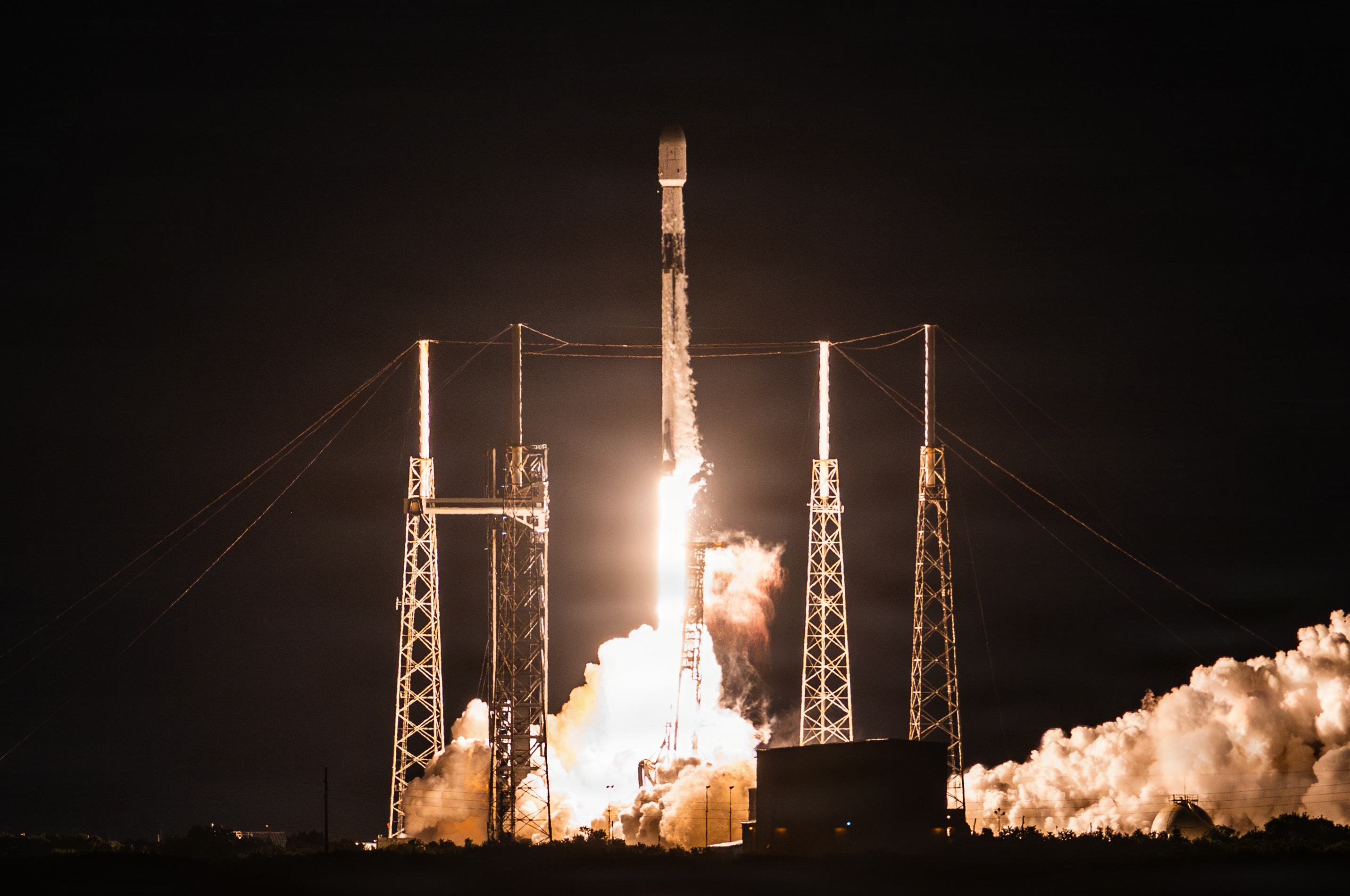
Launch of Bandwagon-4
