= LEOPARD =

Nanosatellite

- Mission type: Technology demonstration
- Operator: Kyushu Institute of Technology

Spacecraft properties
- Spacecraft type: CubeSat

Start of mission
- Launch date: 26 October 2025, 00:00:15 UTC
- Rocket: H3-24W
- Launch site: Tanegashima, LA-Y2
- Deployed from: ISS Kibō; Delivered by HTV-X1
- Deployment date: 3 February 2026 08:20 UTC

Orbital parameters
- Reference system: Geocentric
- Regime: Low Earth
- Inclination: 51.6°

LEOPARD (Light intensity Experiment with On-orbit Positioning and satellite Ranging Demonstration) is a nanosatellite developed by Kyushu Institute of Technology (Kyutech) and Nanyang Technological University (NTU), which will demonstrate multiple technologies including multispectral cameras to monitor horizon glow, and on board processing of one-way radio signals. Students from 17 countries developed the satellite. The satellite's size is 10cm×10cm×30cm, or a 3U size CubeSat. LEOPARD was launched on 26 October 2025 on a H3 Launch Vehicle, and was carried to the International Space Station (ISS) on board HTV-X1. LEOPARD was deployed from the ISS's Kibō module on 3 February 2026 08:20 UTC.

== Deployment ==
LEOPARD was one of six CubeSats released from the Kibo module on 3 February 2026 during JAXA's J-SSOD #35 mission. Gxiba-1, a Mexican satellite selected in the sixth round of the KiboCUBE programme, and CoRAL were released first, followed by KNACKSAT-2. HMU-SAT2 (Teruteru), UiTMSAT-2 and LEOPARD were released together in the third deployment. JAXA's list of deployed CubeSats gives the time of that third release as 7:55 pm JST (10:55 UTC), and it names Mitsui Bussan Aerospace Co., Ltd. as LEOPARD's service provider for the release, with Kyushu Institute of Technology as the satellite's developer.

== Mission ==
Following its deployment from the ISS, LEOPARD will conduct several technology demonstration missions. The satellite will deploy solar panels using shape-memory alloy (SMA) and a heating system. SMAs were selected for use instead of traditional springs to create a thin deployment mechanism.

Nanyang Technological University in Singapore developed LEOPARD's Single-Event Latch-up (SEL) mission payload, which will monitor ionizing space radiation. Space radiation can interact with electronics on board spacecraft and cause them to malfunction, a phenomenon known as single-event effects. LEOPARD's SEL mission payload consists of two microcontrollers with identical functions: one using radiation-hardened microchips, and one using commercial off-the-shelf (COTS) components.

=== MSC ===
LEOPARD's Multispectral camera mission, or MSC, will photograph Earth's atmosphere when the Sun is below the horizon, to observe Rayleigh scattering and aerosol scattering. The MSC payload has an RGB camera and a near-infrared camera. LEOPARD will use its attitude control system to point the cameras while conducting an observation.

=== OPERA ===
OPERA (Onboard Processing of Earth-origin one-way Radio ranging signal) is a technology demonstration mission that will determine the satellite's orbit without using a global navigation satellite system such as GPS. Multiple Earth-based parabolic antennas, each a few meters in size and synchronized with one another, will send signals to the satellite in the S band. The signals will be sent in a predetermined time epoch. The satellite will then track the time of arrival of the signals, along with the Doppler shift of the signals it receives. From the difference in the relative time delay in receiving the signals, OPERA will estimate its own position in orbit. OPERA is expected to position the satellite with an accuracy of a few kilometers. The OPERA device occupies 0.5U of volume in the satellite.

== See also ==
- Aoba VELOX-IV
- Birds-1
- Birds-2
- KITSUNE
- HMU-SAT2
