= Launch and Early Orbit phase =

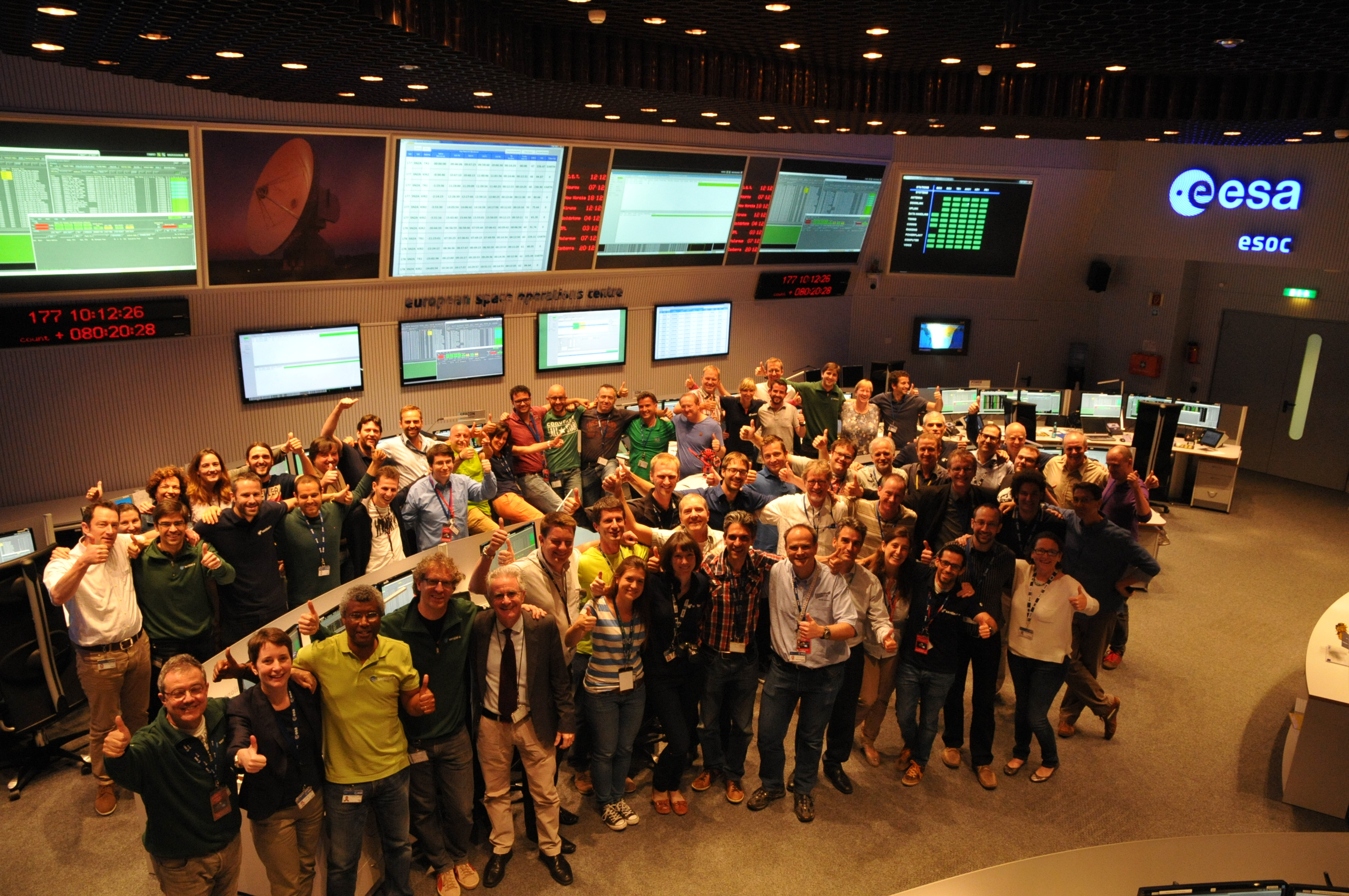
Flight controllers at ESA's ESOC celebrating end of LEOP for Sentinel-2A satellite

In spacecraft operations, Launch and Early Orbit Phase (LEOP) is one of the most critical phases of a mission. Spacecraft operations engineers take control of the satellite after it separates from the launch vehicle. LEOP generally concludes once the satellite is safely positioned in its final orbit. During this period, operations staff work typically 24 hours a day to activate, monitor and control the various subsystems of the satellite, including the deployment of any satellite appendages (such as antennas, solar arrays, reflectors, and radiators), and undertake critical orbit and attitude control manoeuvres. Extra support staff are typically on hand and on-call during LEOP, relative to staffing during normal operations.

For geostationary satellites, the launch vehicle typically carries the spacecraft to Geostationary Transfer Orbit, or GTO. From this elliptical orbit, the LEOP generally includes a sequence of apogee engine firings to reach the circular geostationary orbit.

For some spacecraft like the Intuitive Machines Nova-C lunar lander, initial commissioning is performed autonomously.

== See also ==
- Ground segment
- Satellite space segment

== Links ==
- ESA Spacecraft Operations website
