= HTV-X1 =

2025 Japanese resupply spaceflight to the ISS

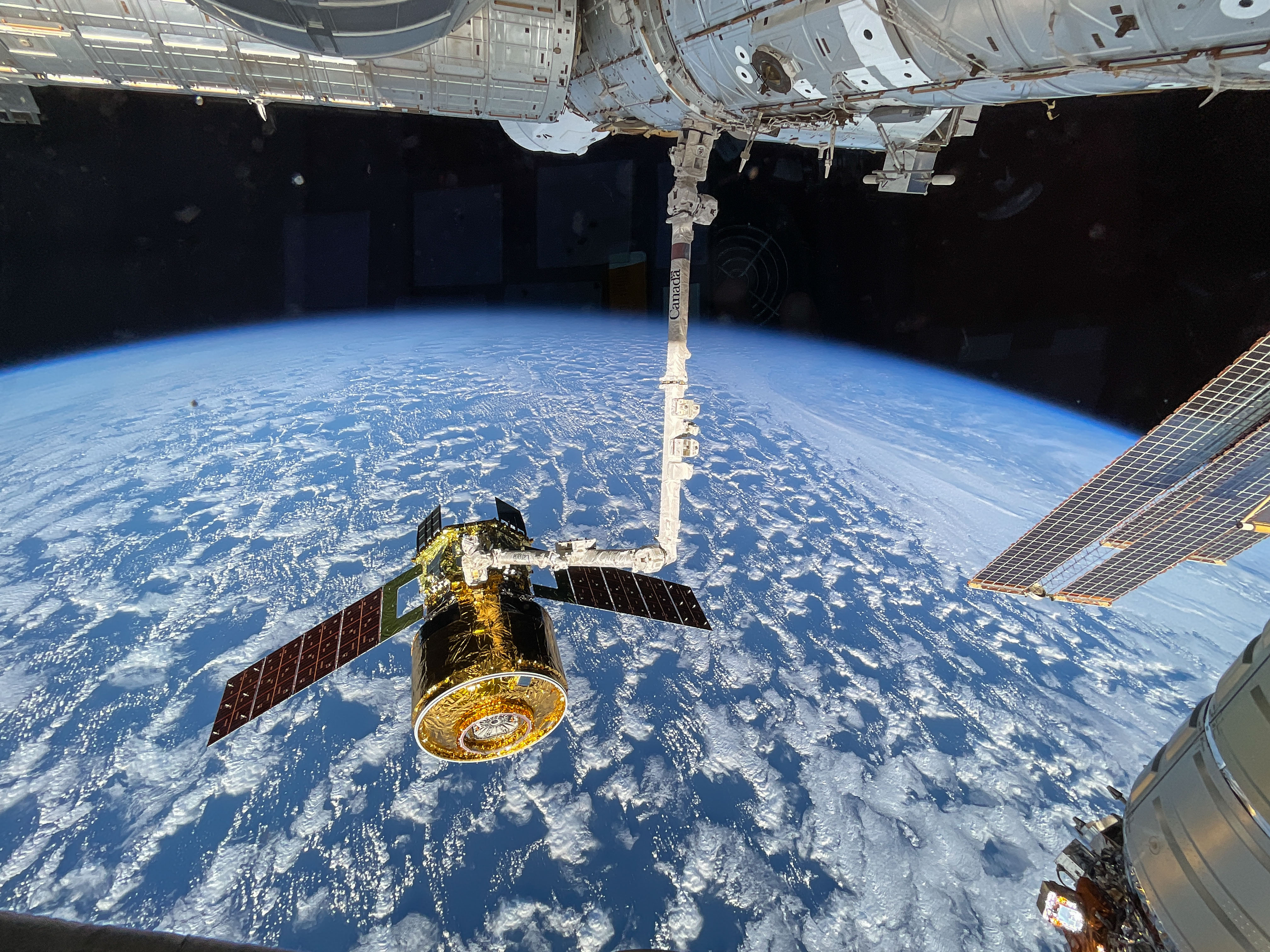
- The HTV-X1 cargo spacecraft is pictured in the grips of the Canadarm2 after completing its arrival at the ISS, 29 October 2025
- Mission type: ISS resupply
- Operator: JAXA
- COSPAR ID: 2025-241A
- SATCAT no.: 66174
- Website: Official website (in Japanese)
- Mission duration: 212 days, 14 hours and 8 minutes

Spacecraft properties
- Spacecraft type: HTV-X
- Manufacturer: Mitsubishi Heavy Industries
- Launch mass: ~14,500 kg (32,000 lb) (Note: Pre-launch press briefing (41:30–44:30) "初号機ということで、14.5弱ぐらいの質量でHTV-X1号機は打ち上げさせていただいてます。[…]これが出来るようになると、フルの16トンが打ち上がるというような使い方になります。[…]暴露カーゴの付きましては、大きく搭載しないという前提で開発しておりましたので、その分1.5トンは減らした打ち上げとなっている。")
- Dimensions: 8.0 × 4.4 m (26.2 × 14.4 ft)

Start of mission
- Launch date: 26 October 2025, 00:00:15 UTC (09:00:15 JST)
- Rocket: H3-24W, Flight 7 (Note: Although designated F7 (Flight 7), it was the rocket's sixth flight.)
- Launch site: Tanegashima, LA-Y2
- Contractor: Mitsubishi Heavy Industries

End of mission
- Disposal: Deorbited
- Decay date: 26 May 2026, 14:09 UTC

Orbital parameters
- Reference system: Geocentric orbit
- Regime: Low Earth orbit
- Inclination: 51.6°

Berthing at ISS
- Berthing port: Harmony nadir
- RMS capture: 29 October 2025, 15:58 UTC
- Berthing date: 30 October 2025, 11:10 UTC
- Unberthing date: 5 March 2026, 19:26 UTC
- RMS release: 6 March 2026, 17:00 UTC
- Time berthed: 126 days, 8 hours and 16 minutes

Cargo
- Mass: ~4,250 kg (9,370 lb)
- Pressurised: ~4,000 kg (8,800 lb)
- Unpressurised: ~250 kg (550 lb)
- Mission insignia HTV (Kotonotori) HTV-X

HTV-X1 was the first flight of the HTV-X series, serving as a technical demonstration mission of the new uncrewed expendable cargo spacecraft. It launched on 26 October 2025.

== Payload ==
As the maiden flight, HTV-X1 is flown as a technical demonstration and was thus not loaded to maximum capacity, with a deficit of approximately 1,500 kilograms (3,300 lb) deducted mainly from unpressurised cargo. Attaining the full design capacity of the HTV-X, 4,069 kg (8,971 lb) pressurised and 1,750 kg (3,860 lb) unpressurised, requires use of the H3 rocket's optional (Note: Pre-launch press briefing (40:52–41:20) "HTV-XやGTOのミッションでより大きな打ち上げ能力が必要になった場合にオプションとして使う[…]") Autonomous Flight Safety System, which enables the flight to be aborted autonomously if anomalies are detected while the rocket is out of range of ground control centers. This system was first tested, but not fully operational during HTV-X1's launch on H3 Flight 7. (Note: Pre-launch press briefing (39:20–40:28))

HTV-X1 remained berthed to the ISS for four months, during which cargo was transferred to the ISS and waste loaded onto the HTV-X.

=== Pressurised cargo ===
HTV-X1 delivered the following pressurised cargo to the International Space Station (ISS):

- Crew supplies
- Kibō system components:
  - LED light unit for JEMRMS
  - AEP2 (Airlock Electronics Package 2), a replacement of the airlock control unit
- DRCS (Demonstration of Removing Carbon Dioxide System)
- NORS (Nitrogen/Oxygen Recharge System) tank
- RST (Water Resupply Tank)
- Science and technology experiments:
  - TUSK (Test facility for lab-automation system in Kibo)
  - Asian Try Zero-G 2025: experiments proposed by students from Asia-Pacific region
  - CubeSats to be deployed into orbit from the ISS: CORAL, Gxiba-1, HMU-SAT2, KNACKSAT-2, LEOPARD, UiTMSAT-2
- Private-sector payloads under JAXA's fee-based Kibō commercial utilization program:
  - Sake brewery Dassai [ja] will attempt sake fermentation in space using equipment co-developed with Mitsubishi Heavy Industries
  - The Japanese licensee for outdoor apparel brand CHUMS [ja] will film advertising and educational videos involving its mascot character in stuffed toy form
  - Rice seeds from Kazo, Saitama are being sent to the ISS and will be subsequently recovered for cultivation on Earth in a local agriculture and education initiative by DigitalBlast
  - Japan Airlines is sending "passports" of customers to be stamped and photographed on board the ISS before being returned to their owners
  - Plant seeds sent to the ISS will be returned to Earth to be cultivated and flowered for display at the World Horticultural Exhibition 2027
  - Stuffed toys of four VTubers and acrylic prints of 43 VTubers are being delivered to Kibō for live streaming and commemorative photo shoot
  - A technology demonstration will showcase the deployment and operation of small, automatic, distributed sensors intended for monitoring environmental quality on board future commercial space stations

=== Unpressurised cargo ===
- i-SEEP3B (IVA-replaceable Small Exposed Experiment Platform)

=== Technology demonstration payloads ===
Apart from its primary cargo mission, the HTV-X is also capable of serving as an orbital platform for conducting experiments and technology demonstrations for up to one and a half years following departure from the ISS. The technology demonstration mission phase for HTV-X1 is planned to last three months, and involves the following payloads:

- H-SSOD, a small satellite deployer that will release the CubeSat Ten-Koh 2 at an altitude of approximately 500 km. This will demonstrate HTV-X's capability to deploy microsatellites from a higher orbit than the ISS, which offers a longer operational lifetime (with respect to orbital decay) and opens up new potential applications for deployed satellites.
- Mt.FUJI, a technology demonstration for satellite laser ranging (SLR). Apart from measuring distance from the ground to the HTV-X, this will be the time that the accuracy of spacecraft attitude determination using SLR is evaluated against actual spacecraft telemetry.
- Technologies related to construction of large space structures for future space solar power generation systems and other applications:
  - DELIGHT, a lightweight flat antenna mounted to the deployable structure
  - SDX, a next-generation solar cell technology demonstration

== Operation ==
=== Development ===
The HTV-X project was formally initiated in 2017, originally intending to launch the first flight in JFY2021, though eventually it was delayed to 2025 due to the delay of H3 launch vehicle development. Manufacturing of a proto-flight model began in 2018. The Pressurized Module (PM) for HTV-X1 was assembled by Mitsubishi Heavy Industries in Aichi Prefecture and shipped to the Tanegashima Space Center (TNSC) in August 2022. The Service Module (SM) was assembled by Mitsubishi Electric in Kanagawa Prefecture and delivered to TNSC in January 2025.

At TNSC, the PM and SM were integrated, and a full system checkout was completed in May 2025. The modules were then separated for cargo and propellant loading beginning in August 2025. The PM and SM were reintegrated and encapsulated within the payload fairing on 9 October, and mated to the H3 launch vehicle on 14 October. Late-access cargo, including perishable food, was loaded on 19 October.

=== Launch ===
HTV-X1 was initially scheduled for launch on 21 October 2025. The launch was postponed due to unfavorable weather conditions.

HTV-X1 was successfully launched on 26 October 2025 at 00:00:15 UTC (09:00:15 JST) aboard Flight 7 of the H3 launch vehicle from Launch Area 2 of the Yoshinobu Launch Complex at TNSC. This mission marked the first H3 flight to use four solid rocket boosters and the first with a wide payload fairing.

=== Cruise and rendezvous with the ISS ===
On 29 October 2025, JAXA astronaut Kimiya Yui, assisted by Zena Cardman, captured the spacecraft using the robotic Canadarm2 at 15:58 UTC. Akihiko Hoshide served as CAPCOM from NASA’s Mission Control Center at the Johnson Space Center in Houston, Texas. Ground teams at NASA and JAXA's Tsukuba Space Center completed berthing to the nadir (Earth-facing) port of the Harmony module at 19:43 UTC. Power transfer from the ISS to HTV-X1 was confirmed at 11:10 UTC on 30 October. During the approach, the spacecraft conducted a commanded retreat maneuver as part of a proximity operations demonstration.

=== Operations while berthed to the ISS ===
The hatch of the Pressurized Module was opened at approximately 12:37 UTC on 30 October.

On 4 November, the Canadarm2 removed the i-SEEP3B payload from the unpressurized cargo deck and transferred it to the robotic JEMRMS arm for installation inside the Kibō module’s airlock.

=== Departure from the ISS and post-berthing operations ===
HTV-X1 was grasped by Canadarm2 and detached from Harmony nadir port at 19:26, 5 March 2026. While held by Canadarm2, HTV-X1 performed the demonstration of the laser ranging device for automated docking.

HTV-X1 left the ISS on 6 March 2026 at approximately 17:00 UTC.

Following its departure from the ISS, HTV-X1 conducted a series of technology demonstration missions lasting approximately three months. HTV-X1 transferred to a higher orbit around 500 km height, and Ten-Koh2 was deployed into orbit from HTV-X1 on 11 March 2026. Technology demonstration of Mt.FUJI was performed since 15 March. Demonstration of DELIGHT was performed since 13 April.

HTV-X1 was disposed by destructive reentry to the Earth atmosphere around 14:09 UTC on 26 May 2026.
