= Hokkaido University of Science =

Coordinates: 43.134940°N 141.248732°E

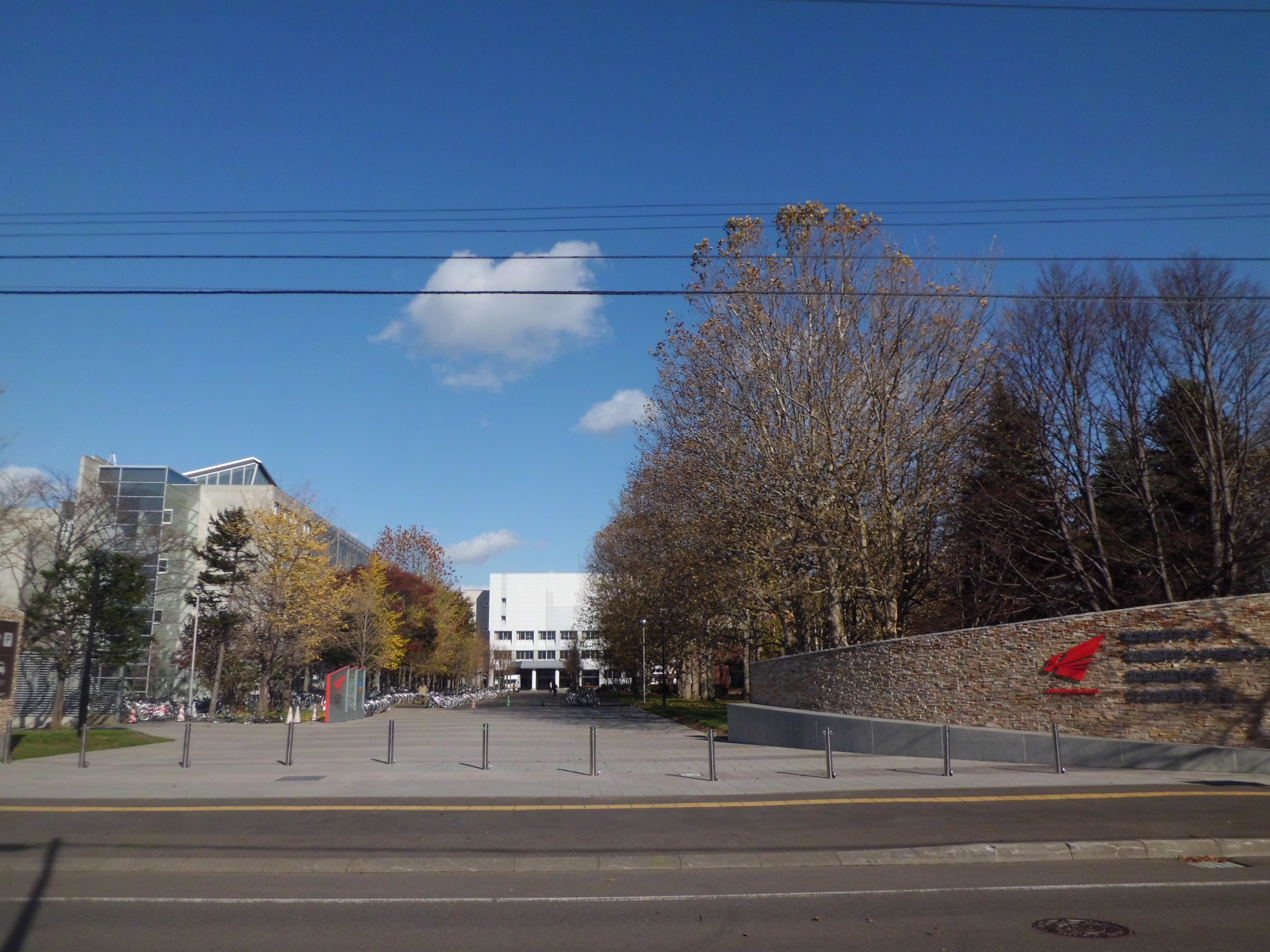
Hokkaido University of Science (2014)

Hokkaido University of Science (北海道科学大学, Hokkaidō kagaku daigaku), or HUS, is a private university in Sapporo, Hokkaidō, Japan, established in 1967. The predecessor of the school was founded in 1924.

== Athletics ==
HUS's intercollegiate sports teams are called the "Wolves".
