= Wu Jong-shinn =

Taiwanese scientist

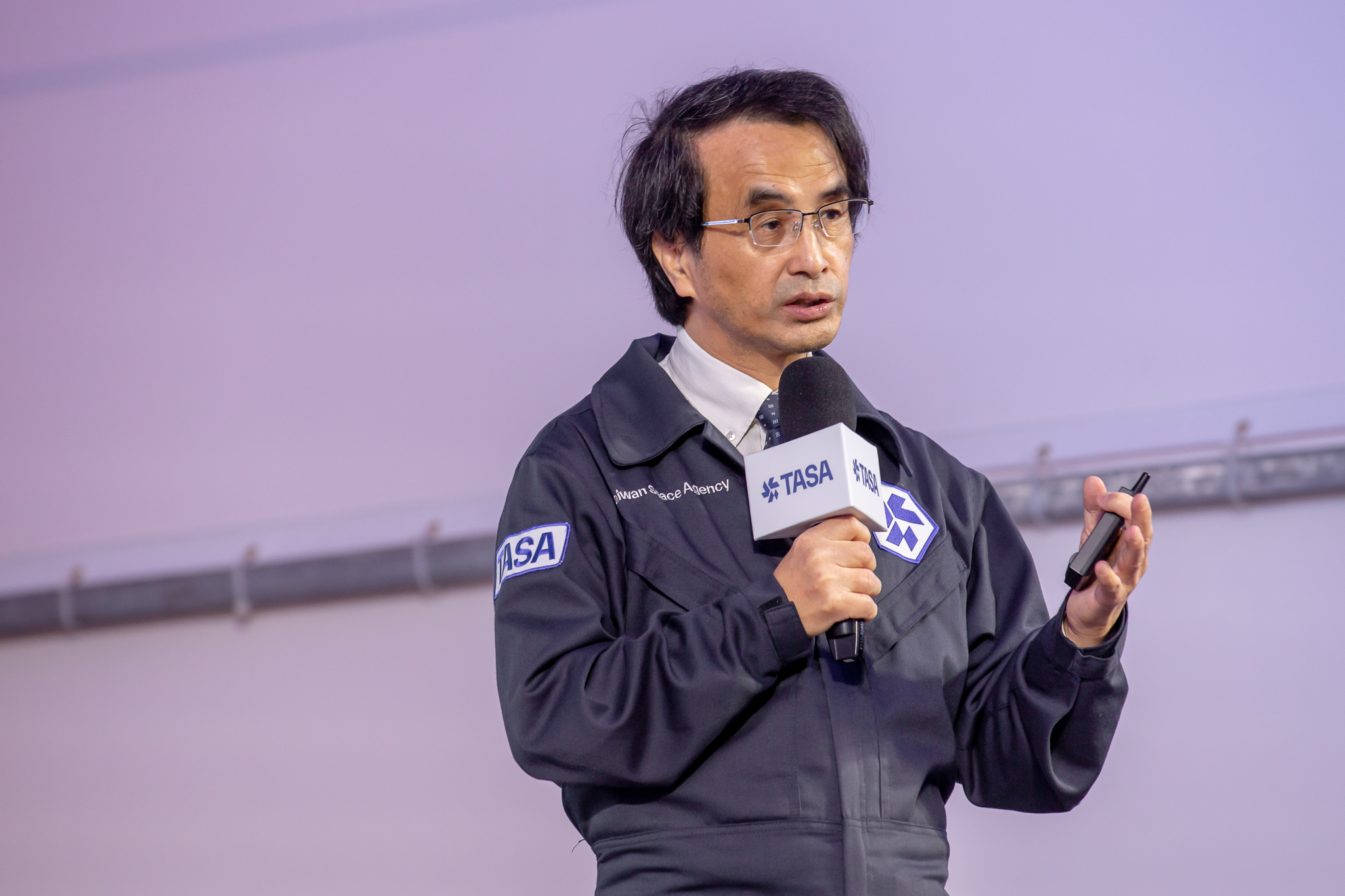
Wu Jong-shinn in 2023

Wu Jong-shinn (Chinese: 吳宗信; Pe̍h-ōe-jī: Gô͘ Chong-sìn, also Wu Tsung-hsin; born 1964) is a Taiwanese scientist, professor, and administrator. He is the director general of the Taiwan Space Agency.

== Early life ==
Wu was born in rural Tainan. His parents were illiterate, and worked in primarily in agriculture, as well as other manual jobs. Wu's first language was Taiwanese Hokkien, and he struggled with the language of instruction, Taiwanese Mandarin, until the second grade. Due to his family's economic status, Wu and his siblings were not provided with opportunities to build model rockets, but during Lunar New Year and Mid-Autumn Festival celebrations, they set off firecrackers.

== Education and career ==
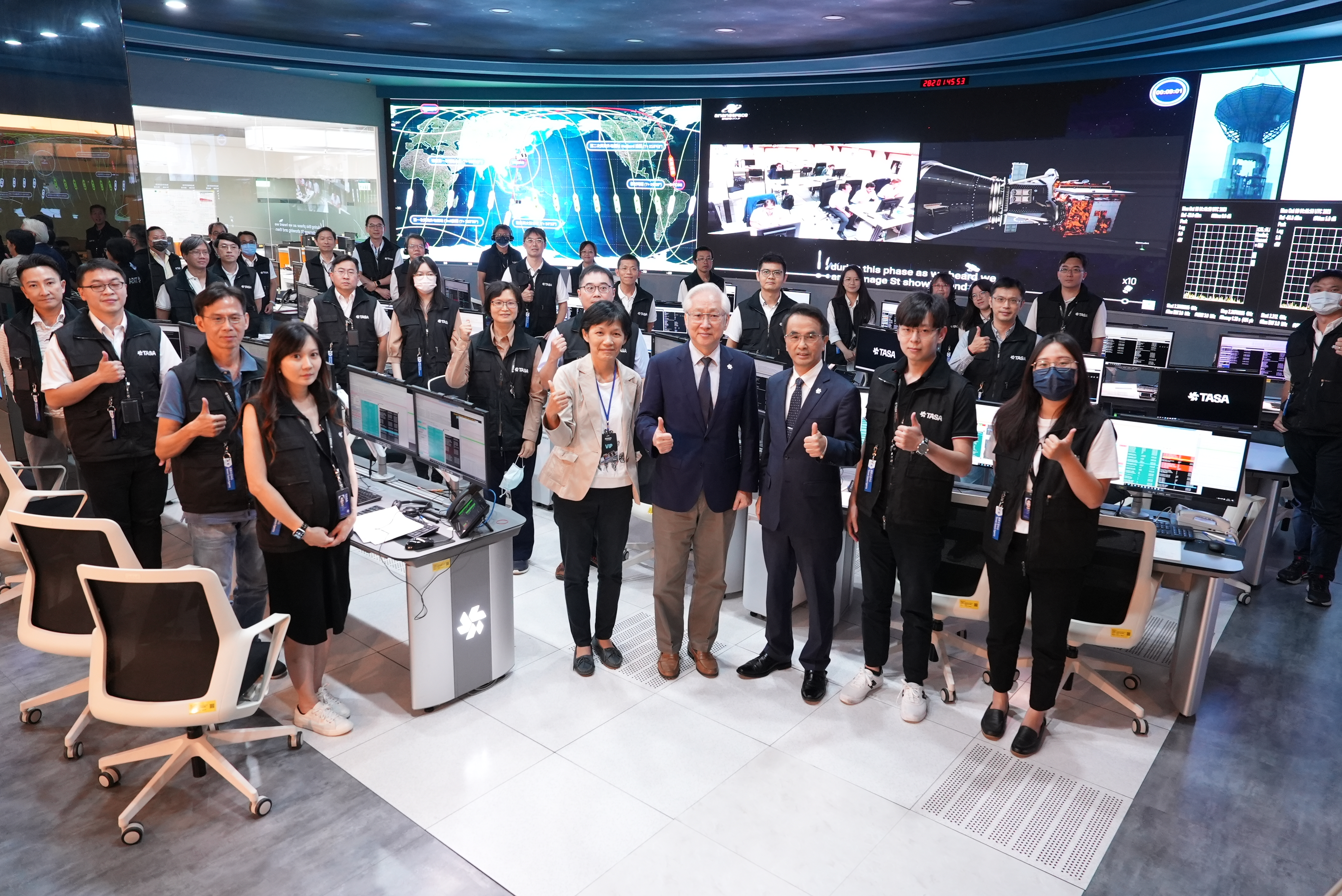
Wu with TASA staff in 2023

In 1986 he received a BS in mechanical engineering from National Taiwan University and a MS in the same field from the same school in 1988. In 1994 he received a PhD in aerospace engineering from the University of Michigan. Upon returning to Taiwan the following year, he went to work for the National Space Organization and stayed there for two years. In 1998 he joined the faculty of National Chiao Tung University and has spent his career there becoming a distinguished professor.

Wu's work with students led to the first successful test launch of a hybrid rocket in Taiwan, from the Syuhai launch site in Mudan, Pingtung, in 2010. Two years later, he was named the inaugural director of the Advanced Rocket Research Center. In 2015, while affiliated with the ARRC, Wu gave the first full TEDx Talk in Taiwanese Hokkien. The following year, Wu co-founded the space technology company TiSPACE, alongside some former students. Wu's character and career up to this point inspired the Mayday song "Tough", released on the 2016 album History of Tomorrow. He left TiSPACE in 2018.

His specialization is in space systems engineering, hybrid and liquid rocket propulsion, rarefied gas dynamics, low-temperature plasma physics and applications, and parallel scientific computing.

He is known as “rocket uncle.”

In August 2021 he was appointed to replaced acting National Space Organization director general Yu Hsien-cheng.

== Awards and fellowships ==
He is an American Society of Mechanical Engineers (ASME) Fellow, an American Institute of Aeronautics and Astronautics (AIAA) Associate Fellow, International Academy of Astronautics (IAA) Corresponding Member, and Institute of Electrical and Electronics Engineers (IEEE) Senior Member. He sits on the Editorial Advisory Board of AIAA Journal, AIAA Hybrid Rocket Technical Committee, and IEEE Emerging Plasma Nanotechnologies (TC 17) Member
