= Norah Wilson =

Australian Aboriginal community leader (1901–1971)

- Born: Norah Magdalene Boxer; 12 August 1901; Bookabie, South Australia, Australia
- Died: 7 July 1971 (aged 69)
- Other name: Norah Magdalene Hart
- Occupation: community worker
- Spouse: Ernest Roy Wilson (m. 1921)
- Father: Jack Boxer

Norah Magdalene Wilson (née Boxer, later Hart; 12 August 1901 – 7 July 1971) was an Australian Aboriginal community worker.

Wilson was born in Bookabie, South Australia. Her father, Jack Boxer, was English; her mother was a Kukata woman, who later married an Aboriginal man called Steve Hart, whose name Norah took. As a child, Wilson lived in the children's home at the Lutheran mission at Koonibba. There, she gained skills in literacy, needlework, and playing the organ. She was baptized and confirmed as an adolescent. She had also been taught by family members about bush food and traditional stories, during trips in the bush.

In 1921, she married a Wirrangu-Irish man, Ernest Roy Wilson, who worked as a labourer and fettler, and played Australian rules football. For many years, they moved between stations where Ernest found work, and then small communities along the railway on the west coast of South Australia such as Kyancutta, Warramboo, Yantanabie and Minnipa. They would later set up a residence in Adelaide for Aboriginals vacationing from elsewhere. While living in Largs Bay, South Australia, Wilson helped Aboriginals from the rural areas by giving them shelter when they were visiting from there and helping other keep in touch with their city-dwelling relatives. She died in Woodville, South Australia. She and her husband had ten children, one of whom had predeceased her.
