= Southern Launch =

Australian rocket launch and range service provider

SouthernLaunch.space Pty Ltd
- Company type: Proprietary limited company
- Founded: 31 August 2017; 8 years ago
- Founder: Lloyd Damp
- Headquarters: 242 Port Road, Hindmarsh, Adelaide; Launch sites: Whalers Way, Sleaford 34.934°S 135.642°E; Koonibba 31.860°S 133.456°E
- Services: Infrastructure and logistics support for orbital and sub‑orbital rocket launches
- Number of employees: 20
- Website: www.southernlaunch.space

Southern Launch is the trading name of SouthernLaunch.space Pty Ltd, an Australian aerospace company and launch service provider. As of 2023, they operated Australia's only rocket facilities approved by the Australian Space Agency for launches to space.

The company, which has its main office in Adelaide, South Australia, provides infrastructure and logistics support for orbital and sub-orbital launches of commercial satellites and payloads. This role is in response to increasing demand from small-satellite companies for dedicated launches that avoid the constraints and delays of having other payloads on the same vehicle. It operates from two launch sites on western and southern Eyre Peninsula.

== Facilities ==
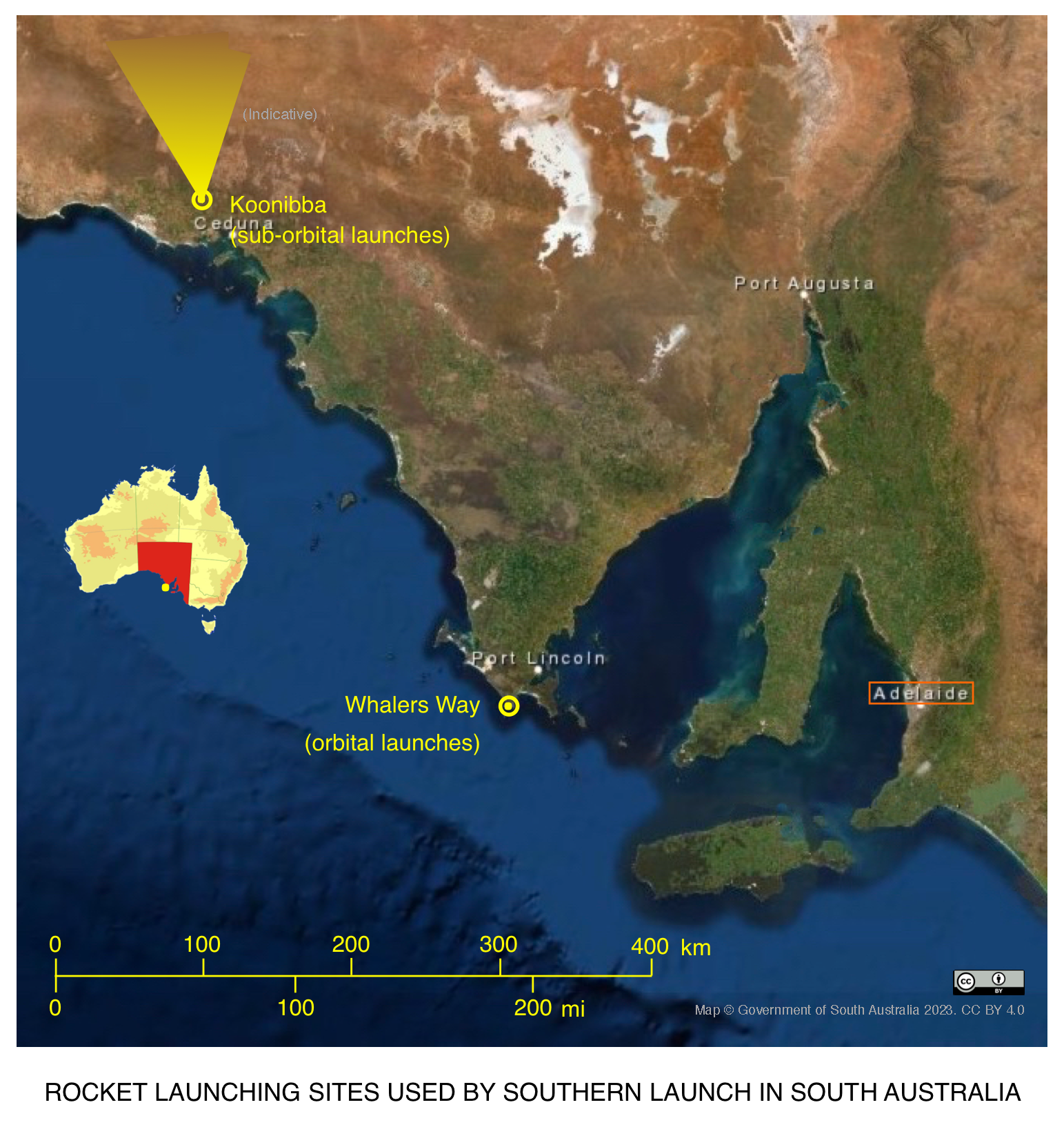

Southern Launch has an agreement with Perigee Aerospace of South Korea to use its launch facilities. The company also has a contract to be the launch service provider for Adelaide company DEWC Systems, which had its first launch in September 2020. DEWC is engaged in an advanced sensing program involving satellites capable of helping the Australian Defence Force to detect and track challenging targets.

The company operates from two sites: the Koonibba test area in western Eyre Peninsula, 34 kilometres (21 miles) north-west of the town of Ceduna, and the Whalers Way site on the southern tip of Eyre Peninsula, 35 kilometres (22 miles) south-west of the regional city of Port Lincoln.

The company expects to launch 40 rockets a year depending on permanent government approvals for its two currently leased sites. The federal government via the Australian Space Agency granted launch licences for individual test launches in 2020, 2021 and 2022. Separately, the state government gave temporary environmental approval and as of 2023 was considering approval of the Whalers Way launch pad on a permanent basis. Pending such approval, a concrete launch pad has been the only infrastructure constructed at each site. Other assets were mobile and were brought on site only during launch sessions.

=== Koonibba ===
The Koonibba Test Range, near the small Aboriginal township of Koonibba, is for sub-orbital launches. Chosen for easy recovery of equipment, which is not possible over water, it accommodates trajectories of 145 kilometres (90 miles) over two uninhabited national parks, the Yumbarra Conservation Park and Yellabinna Wilderness Protection Area. The site was the location of the company's first launches, in September 2020, which were the first commercial, space-capable rocket launches in Australia.

The range is located on Aboriginal land by permission of the Koonibba community, some of whose members have been hired to help set up and operate it – including cordoning off roads and other traffic control, interacting with emergency services, and guiding public spectators at launch time to ensure safe conditions.

=== Whalers Bay ===
The Whalers Way site is for polar and Sun-synchronous orbit launches. It is only 300 metres (330 yards) from the Southern Ocean, allowing southwards trajectories of more than 3000 kilometres (1900 miles) before Antarctica is reached. In late 2022, the company was reported as being in negotiations with the South Australian government to either extend approval to use the concrete launch pad or to secure permanent development approval for the site.

== Rockets and payloads ==
Southern Launch's initial activities were the first of continuing efforts to test its launch facilities and evaluate environmental impacts in addition to testing rocket propulsion, guidance, telemetry and structural systems.

The first two vehicles to be launched, on 19 September 2020, were small 34 kilograms (75 pounds), 3.4 metres (11 feet) long DART rockets, which took a northward sub-orbital trajectory from the Koonibba site.

Subsequent activity involved Hapith 1 rockets supplied by Taiwanese company, TiSpace, which had been invited by the Australian Government to manufacture their rockets in Australia. In 2021 the company established an Australian subsidiary company, TASpace, in Adelaide, for that purpose.

TASpace rockets are distinguished by the name "Kestrel". Kestrel 1 rockets have two stages, weigh 3 tonnes (3.0 long tons) and stand 10 metres (33 feet) tall. Their engine uses TiSpace's non-explosive hybrid propulsion technology to climb to a sub-orbital altitude of about 100 kilometres (62 miles), reaching speeds of two to six times the speed of sound (Mach 2–6). (Note: In comparison, rockets that reach orbit travel at Mach 25 to maintain orbital velocity, about 28,000 km/h (17,000 mph).)

On 3 May 2024, HyImpulse's SR75 suborbital rocket successfully flew its maiden launch from Koonibba Test Range.

== Environmental concerns ==
Bird enthusiasts are hoping that the site may be assessed as unsuitable for rocket launches, saying that they threaten the survival of the Southern emu-wren; others are concerned about potential fire risks. Southern Launch's CEO, LLoyd Damp, said the company had developed a 3200-page environmental impact statement in consultation with a range of industry experts. It was sponsoring research into the lower Eyre Peninsula's fauna and flora; implementing a weed, vermin and feral animal eradication program; and reintroducing native vegetation. He also stated that the company had been able to "demonstrate when we attempted the first launch, when we did have a fire on the launch pad, we were able to manage the situation and make sure that the environment was never put at risk." He said that in the event that the site was approved for permanent use, the company was planning to set up its own first-responder team to cover any fire, medical or other emergencies.
