= Advanced Rocket Research Center =

Taiwanese space transport research organization

Advanced Rocket Research Center 國立陽明交通大學前瞻火箭研究中心
- Type: Research institute
- Industry: R&D
- Founded: April 2012
- Headquarters: Hsinchu City, Taiwan
- Key people: Jong-Shinn Wu (Director)
- Products: space transport
- Number of employees: 45
- Website: https://arrc.tw/

The Advanced Rocket Research Center (ARRC; Chinese: 前瞻火箭研究中心; Tongyong Pinyin: Ciánjhān Huǒjiàn Yánjiòu Jhōngsīn; Tâi-lô: Tsiân-tsiam Hué-tshinn Gián-kiù Tiong-sim) is a Taiwanese space transport research organization headquartered at National Yang Ming Chiao Tung University in Hsinchu City, Taiwan, with a research focus in hybrid rockets. Founded in April 2012, ARRC is supported by research grants and private donors through crowdsourcing platforms.

== Introduction ==
ARRC is jointly organized by multiple universities in Taiwan. It was established at National Chiao Tung University in June 2012 and funded by corporate and private donations.

The main participants include Distinguished Professor Jong-Shinn Wu, Professor Tsung-Lin Chen from National Chiao Tung University, Associate Professor Ming-Tzu Ho from National Cheng Kung University, Professor Hui-Wen Hu from National Pingtung University of Science and Technology, Professor Hsin-Piao Lin from National Taipei University of Technology, Assistant Professor Jen-Perng Yu from Ming Chuan University, and Assistant Professor Juan-Chen Haung from National Taiwan Ocean University. Jong-Shinn Wu is now the chairman of the group.

== Test Project ==
=== APPL ===
The APPL is a kind of solid rocket that uses sugar with an oxidizer as fuel. This type of rocket is also known as a sugar rocket. APPL is named after the Aerothermal & Plasma Physics Laboratory in National Chiao Tung University, which began to develop and manufacture small rockets under the leadership of Professor Jong-Shinn Wu in 2007. Because sugar rockets are safe and easy to manufacture, and also produce less pollution, they were the first type of rocket made by the group. Since ARRC was formally established in 2012, APPL rockets have been used in tests of several secondary systems in large rockets, so that the systems can be applied to the HTTP Hybrid Rocket.

- APPL-0 alpha On Jun 22, 2008, the first flight test of ARRC was held at Siangshan Wetland, Hsinchu. The rocket successfully lifted off. However, due to excessive force being applied to the cone, the cone broke and the parachute was deployed early.
- APPL-0 beta On Jun 22, 2008, the second flight test of ARRC was held at Siangshan Wetland, Hsinchu. The rocket broke apart on the launch tower after ignition.
- APPL-1 also called APPL-I. On Jan 18, 2009, the third flight test of ARRC was held at Siangshan Wetland, Hsinchu. The rocket successfully lifted off. The parachute did not open completely, yet the rocket still landed. The maximum height was 835 meters.
- APPL-2 also called APPL-II. On Jun 28, 2009, the fourth flight test of ARRC was held at Siangshan Wetland, Hsinchu. APPL-2 was a multistage rocket with solid fuel as the propellant. After the first stage booster was exhausted and separated, the second stage was successfully ignited. However, the rocket flew far off course, and couldn't be retrieved.
- APPL-3 also called APPL-III. On Sep 7, 2009, the fifth flight test of ARRC was held at Changhua Coastal Industrial Park. One of the boosters malfunctioned, causing the rocket to explode a short time after launching.
- APPL-4 also called APPL-IV. On Jan 24, 2011, the seventh flight test of ARRC was held at Siangshan Wetland, Hsinchu. The rocket successfully lifted off, but the parachute did not open upon landing. The maximum height was about 500 meters.
- APPL-5 1 also called APPL-V 1. On Mar 10, 2011, the eighth flight test of ARRC was held at Siangshan Wetland, Hsinchu. One booster malfunctioned and caused the rocket to explode shortly after launch, similar to what had happened during the APPL-3 test.
- APPL-5 2 also called APPL-V 2. On Mar 10, 2011, the ninth flight test of ARRC was held at Siangshan Wetland, Hsinchu. The rocket successfully lifted off and separated, but the parachute didn't completely open on landing.
- APPL-6 also called APPL-VI. On May 9, 2011, the tenth flight test of ARRC was held at Siangshan Wetland, Hsinchu. The connector between the rocket and the launch tower broke, so it didn't launch, but instead, it stayed on the launch tower until the fuel was exhausted.
- APPL-6 2 also called APPL-VI 2. On Jun 24, 2011, the eleventh flight test of ARRC was held at Siangshan Wetland, Hsinchu. The rocket successfully lifted off but failed to separate because of a malfunctioning v-band.
- APPL-mini 1 was a small solid-sugar rocket developed for the camp organized by the National Space Organization. It was a small rocket without electrical control. There were in total 12 APPL-mini 1 small rockets made by both students and lecturers launched in 青青草原 on Jul 20, 2012. It was the fourteenth flight test of ARRC.
- APPL-mini 2 was a small solid-sugar rocket developed for the camp organized by the National Space Organization. It was a small rocket without electrical control. There were in total 11 APPL-mini 2 small rockets made by both students and lecturers launched in 青青草原 on Jul 18, 2013. Some rockets had a smartphone installed inside them to record altitude, distance traveled, speed, and other information.
- APPL-Banan 1 On Sep 1, 2013, the sixteenth flight test of ARRC was held at Siangshan Wetland, Hsinchu. The rocket was carried to the air by a balloon with a diameter of 3 meters and expected to release at 1000 meters high. However, the rope used to connect the balloon and the rocket was loose and the rocket dropped at 30 meters above the ground. The aim of the test was to examine the parachute recovery system.
- APPL-7 On Nov 9, 2013, the seventeenth flight test of ARRC was held at Siangshan Wetland, Hsinchu. The rocket successfully lifted off but the recovery system didn't work as expected, leading to the rocket crashing.
- APPL-7 II On Dec 28, 2013, the eighteenth flight test of ARRC was held at Siangshan Wetland, Hsinchu. This time the rocket used 2 reserve parachutes and 1 main parachute recovery system. The rocket successfully lifted off and the parachutes opened sequentially.
- APPL-8 On Jan 26, 2014, the nineteenth flight test of ARRC was held at Siangshan Wetland, Hsinchu. The rocket successfully lifted off and the maximum height was almost 1000 meters.
- APPL-9 α On Jan 4, 2015, the twenty-first flight test of ARRC was held at Siangshan Wetland, Hsinchu. APPL-9 was a two-stage rocket. The first stage was a sugar rocket and the second stage was a hybrid rocket with nitrous oxide as an oxidizer. The body tube of the rocket was 3D-printed and the nose cone was made from fiberglass. There was an issue with the first stage, leading to it exploding during ignition. The second stage was ignited after the explosion and flew some distance away. All of the three parachutes deployed. The aim of this test was to test the avionics on the rocket.
- APPL-9 ß On Apr 18, 2015, the twenty-second flight test of ARRC was held at Siangshan Wetland, Hsinchu. Due to the failure of APPL-9 Alpha, ARRC used PLA in the 3D printed body tube and reinforced the tube with fiberglass. The rocket successfully lifted off but didn't separate due to a malfunction of the v-band. For safety reasons, the second stage didn't ignite. It was found that two explosive bolts failed to separate. The parachute was deployed successfully.
- APPL-9 C On Jan 31, 2016, the twenty-third flight test of ARRC was held at Siangshan Wetland, Hsinchu. ARRC made a small two-stage rocket with a similar configuration to APPL-9 alpha and APPL-9 beta. This was used to test some of the secondary systems used in HTTP-3, including the avionics system and separation devices. The body tube was made from the same materials as the body tube of APPL-9 Beta. The first stage was a solid rocket, fueled by sugar and an oxidizer. The second stage was a hybrid rocket with Nitrous Oxide as the liquid oxidizer and polyethylene as the fuel. The total weight of the rocket was about 27 kg. The rocket successfully lifted off and separated, but the parachute on the first stage failed to deploy. The three parachutes on the second stage deployed successfully. The maximum height was about 1100 meters.
- APPL 10 launched on Dec 1, 2018. The rocket was 3.2 meters long and had a diameter of 0.156 meters. The total weight was 30 kg and the maximum height was around 1000 meters. APPL 10 failed during separation and didn't reach the expected height.

=== HTTP ===
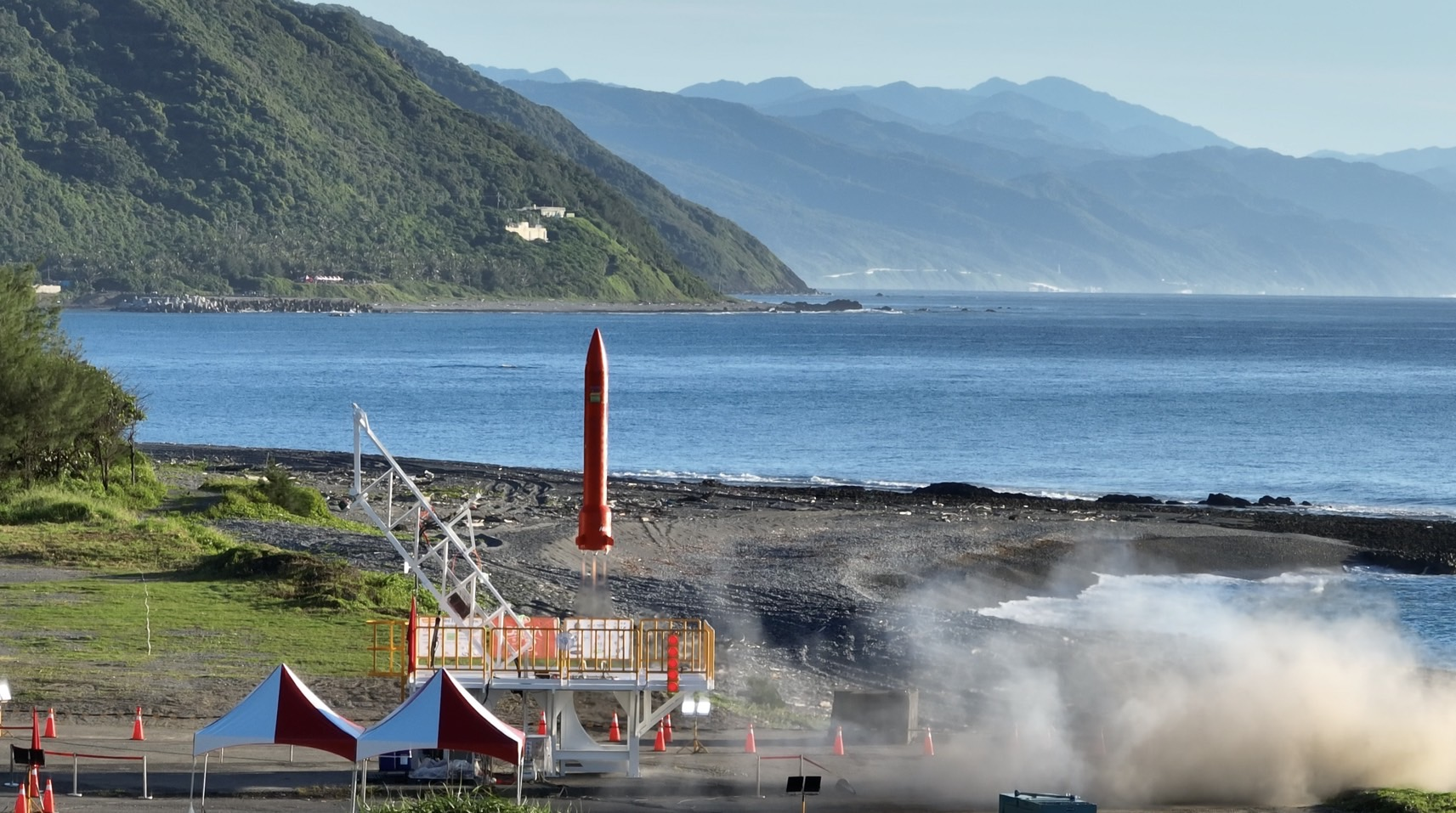
The first flight test of HTTP-3A rocket, Xuhai short-term sounding rocket launch site

HTTP is a sounding rocket (a rocket carrying scientific instruments). HTTP is named after four cities that the cooperative universities are located at, which are Hsinchu (National Chiao Tung University), Taipei (National Taipei University of Technology), Tainan (National Cheng Kung University), and Pingtung (National Pingtung University of Science and Technology). Furthermore, the chairman of ARRC Professor Jong-Shinn Wu associated the HTTP rocket with the Hypertext Transfer Protocol and indicated that as with the Internet, the possibilities of the HTTP rocket could be unlimited.

- HTTP-1 On Sep 16, 2010, the sixth flight test of ARRC was held at the east coast of Pingtung. This was the first test of a hybrid rocket for ARRC and the first in Taiwan. The test aimed to adjust thrust by changing the amount of the oxidizer in the engine.
- HTTP-2 α On Sep 3, 2011, the twelfth flight test of ARRC was held at the east coast of Pingtung. HTTP-2 α was a two-stage rocket, where the first stage provided the thrust and the second stage was equipped with avionics. At the first launch, the throttle was stuck, and the rocket didn't operate properly. There were attempts to fix the problem, but the throttle stayed stuck, and the test was canceled eventually.
- HTTP-2ß On Sep 7, 2013, the sixteenth flight test of ARRC was held at the east coast of Pingtung. HTTP-2β was a two-stage rocket. The first stage was a hybrid rocket engine which provided thrust; while the second stage contained avionics. A UAV was used to record the test. Two seconds after launch, the rocket lost connection with the ground for an unknown reason.
- HTTP-3S On Mar 24, 2014, the twentieth flight test of ARRC was held at the east coast of Pingtung. Under the support of Ministry of Science and Technology (Taiwan), National Space Organization, National Chiao Tung University, and Taiwan Typhoon and Flood Research Institute, HTTP-3S was the largest rocket developed by ARRC. The rocket was 6.35 meters long and 0.4 meters in diameter. It could fly over 10,000 meters. This test was to examine the performance of each secondary system at high velocity.
- HTTP-3A is the ongoing project of ARRC. The project involves the development of a fully hybrid orbital rocket. HTTP-3A flew on July 10, 2022 for a test of its second stage.

== Launches ==
On 24 March 2014, ARRC tested the HTTP-3S rocket near the coastline of Pingtung County. The HTTP-3S rocket was one of the largest hybrid sounding rockets launched in Taiwan, with a length of 6.35 m, a diameter of 0.4 m, and weight of 300 kg. It was propelled by a hybrid engine which used nitrous oxide as an oxidizer. The engine was capable of delivering 1,000 kgf (9,800 N; 2,200 lbf) of thrust (with I_{sp} up to 250 seconds). The goal of the HTTP-3S launch was to test the functions of all subsystems during high-speed flight. The flight data gathered during the launch was used for the second stages rocket design of future dual-stage sounding rockets and the validation of launch site safety measures.

On 18 April 2015, ARRC tested the APPL-9β sounding rocket at the Siangshan Wetland in Hsinchu City. The APPL-9β rocket was propelled by solid fuel in the first stage and a hybrid fuel in the second stage. The casing was 3D-printed, and made of PLA. The rocket carried a test satellite made by the National Central University.

== Popular culture ==
The band Mayday wrote their song Tough about ARRC engineer Jong-Shinn Wu.

== See also ==
- NewSpace
- TiSPACE
