= Whalers Way Orbital Launch Complex =

Space launch facility in South Australia

- Interactive map of Whalers Way Orbital Launch Complex
- Location: Sleaford, South Australia, Australia
- Coordinates: 34.91°S 135.65°E
- Short name: Whalers Way
- Operator: Southern Launch
Launch history
- Launches: 1
- First launch: 16 September 2021

Whalers Way Orbital Launch Complex is a commercial spaceport and rocket-launching facility operated by Southern Launch in the locality of Sleaford, near Port Lincoln on the Eyre Peninsula of South Australia. The launch of a Taiwanese suborbital test flight suffered a launch failure at ignition in 2021, and no launches have taken place since then. Concerns have been expressed by environmental groups and the traditional owners, as the area is inhabited by threatened species such as the southern emu wren and white-bellied whipbird. In September 2026, the Native Vegetation Council denied permission for a launch complex to be built at the site, which lies within a conservation area.

== History ==
Southern Launch established its headquarters in Adelaide in 2018, before the city was announced as home for the Australian Space Agency. Its offices are located in Pirie Street.

The launchpad at Whalers Way was publicly announced in December 2018, with Southern Launch leading the project. The project was declared a major development by the state of South Australia on 22 August 2019, and on 23 October 2019 Southern Launch made a joint announcement with Perigee Aerospace of South Korea about the launch of the "Blue Whale 1" rocket from the Whalers Way facility.

The facility was officially approved by the Australian Space Agency on 14 July 2021, intended for use to launch commercial satellites.

Southern Launch planned to build two launch pads for orbital launches to polar and Sun-synchronous orbits. Pad 1 was expected to host up to three test launches by the end of 2021.

== Launches ==
It has been anticipated that around 25 launches a year would take place at Whalers Way once operational.

Perigee Aerospace became the first customer with a planned launch of its rocket "Blue Whale 1" in July 2020. However, this had not been launched by late August.

On 16 September 2021, 06:39 UTC, the Taiwanese TiSPACE company's Hapith I rocket (flight VS01) launched from Whalers Way Pad 1 on a suborbital test flight, after two aborted launches. This was the maiden flight of Hapith I and first of three test launches from Pad 1 at Whalers Way. The flight suffered a launch failure at ignition, causing the rocket to catch fire. The intended apogee of the flight was 250 km (160 mi), and as payload the rocket carried an Ionosphere Scintillation Package (ISP) for the Taiwanese National Space Organization. The ISP included a compact ionospheric probe, a star tracker, and an aspectometer for the purpose of ionospheric scintillation research.

Two more test launches of the vehicle, conducted by ATSpace under the Kestrel I name, were scheduled for late 2022; however, no further launches had taken place by September 2026. Further launches have taken place at Koonibba Test Range, further up the west coast, instead.

== Environmental concerns ==
Concerns have been raised by environmentalists from the Nature Conservation Society of South Australia (NCSSA), Birdlife Australia, and traditional owners the Nauo people, as threatened species such as the southern emu wren and white-bellied whipbird inhabit the area, which could be affected by the noise, and there are places of cultural significance to the Nauo people. Environmental impact assessments were being undertaken as of May 2021, with plans to modify the site and implement mitigation strategies should problems be found. Southern Launch has committed to protecting nature and managing tourism activities to ensure that the environment will be preserved.

Protests took place at the site ahead of the first scheduled launch on 9 September 2021, after whales were reported swimming in Fishery Bay, east of the maritime exclusion zone, and police attended. Whales were later confirmed 30km away in Boston Bay, and none observed in Fishery Bay. Local residents and conservationists, including the Nature Conservation Society, Wilderness Society, Conservation Council of South Australia, the National Trust of Australia (SA), Birds SA and Trees for Life have been calling for an independent review. An ecologist from the University of Adelaide and the NCSSA are concerned that the extensive clearing (23.76 ha (58.7 acres) of vegetation) and construction work involved in expanding the facility could cause the southern emu wren to become extinct. Southern Launch CEO Lloyd Damp said he was aware of the issues, and they were in the process of working out a better location for launch site A. The expansion plans are under review by the Government of South Australia's PlanSA, as well as the Commonwealth Government for compliance with the Environment Protection and Biodiversity Conservation Act 1999.

Public consultation that closed in September showed strong support from the surrounding communities of Port Lincoln and Tulka, the results of which are yet to be released as of 27 September 2021.

In early October, a rare square-tailed kite was photographed at the site, but it is thought likely that it was a chick from a nest a long distance away. The last time one was spotted on the Eyre Peninsula was in 2004.

== Construction halted ==
In September 2026, the Native Vegetation Council, an independent body, disallowed variations to the heritage agreement that would allow Southern Launch to build the Whalers Way Orbital Launch Complex, as the site is on land that is a recognised conservation area for native flora and fauna. It is not known whether the state government will seek to overturn the ruling.

== See also ==
- Koonibba Test Range, South Australia
