= Bruey =

Bruey is a surname. Notable people with the surname include:

- Stéphane Bruey (1932–2005), French footballer
- Will Bruey (born 1988), American aerospace executive

== See also ==
- François-Paul Brueys d'Aigalliers (1753–1798), French Admiral
