= HyImpulse =

German private space launch enterprise

- Type: Private
- Industry: Aerospace
- Founded: 2018
- Headquarters: Germany
- Products: SR75 suborbital launch vehicle SL1 small-lift launch vehicle
- Total assets: 74,000,000 (2025)
- Website: www.hyimpulse.de/en/

HyImpulse is a German private space launch enterprise headquartered in Neuenstadt am Kocher and developing a small launch vehicle designed around hybrid-propellant rockets. The company is a DLR spinoff founded in 2018 out of the chemical propulsion center of the German space agency's Lampoldshausen facility. HyImpulse is bankrolled by Rudolf Schwarz, chairman of German technology company IABG.

== Rockets ==
The company is developing a three-stage hybrid rocket designed to transport to LEO satellites of up to 500 kg named SL1. The company is also developing the suborbital SR75 launch vehicle.

SR75 is 12-metre-long and 2.5-tonne mass single-stage rocket which is planned to transport small payloads weighing up to 250 kg to an altitude of around 250 km. This smaller rocket will serve both as the company's first commercial service and as a technology demonstrator for SL1. In particular, the SL1 uses 12 of the same engines as SR75 (8 of those on the first stage).

On 3 May 2024, the SR75 launched on its maiden flight (mission titled "Light this Candle") from the Koonibba Test Range, the ascent was successful. The rocket reached an apogee of 50 kilometers and parachuted back to ground and was recovered.

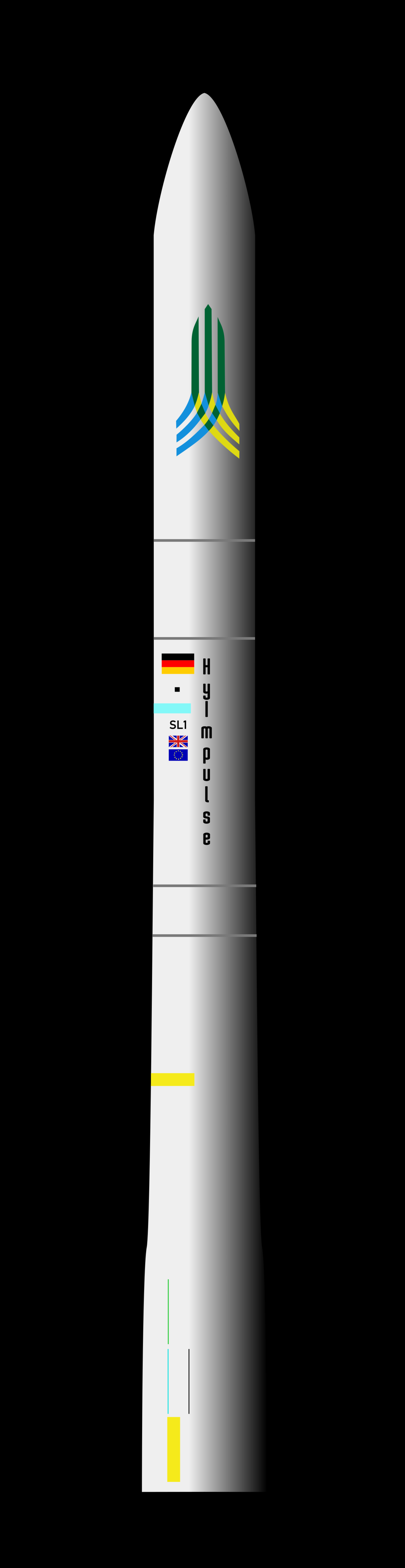
Artist's impression of the SL1 rocket

== Engines ==
The hybrid rocket engine uses a paraffin-based fuel and liquid oxygen. On 4 September 2023 HyImpulse completed its ninth hot fire test campaign. With the successful completion of the testing, HyImpulse qualified its HyPLOX-75 hybrid rocket motor for flight. The motor will be used aboard the SR75 and SL1 first and second stages.

== Launch sites ==
On 28 July 2023, the United Kingdom's UK Civil Aviation Authority (CAA) granted HyImpulse permission to launch its SR75 rocket for the first time from SaxaVord Spaceport in Scotland between 1 December 2023 and 30 November 2024. However, in November 2023 it was announced that the SR75 maiden flight would take place in March 2024 from the Koonibba Test Range in Australia, operated by Southern Launch, eventually taking place on 3 May 2024.

== See also ==
- Isar Aerospace
- Rocket Factory Augsburg
- PLD Space
