= Kokatha dialect =

Australian Aboriginal language

Kokatha
- Native to: Australia
- Region: Western South Australia
- Ethnicity: Kokatha
- Native speakers: 16 (2016)
- Language family: Pama–Nyungan: Wati; Western Desert; Kokatha

Language codes
- ISO 639-3: ktd
- Glottolog: koka1244
- AIATSIS: C3
- ELP: Kokatha
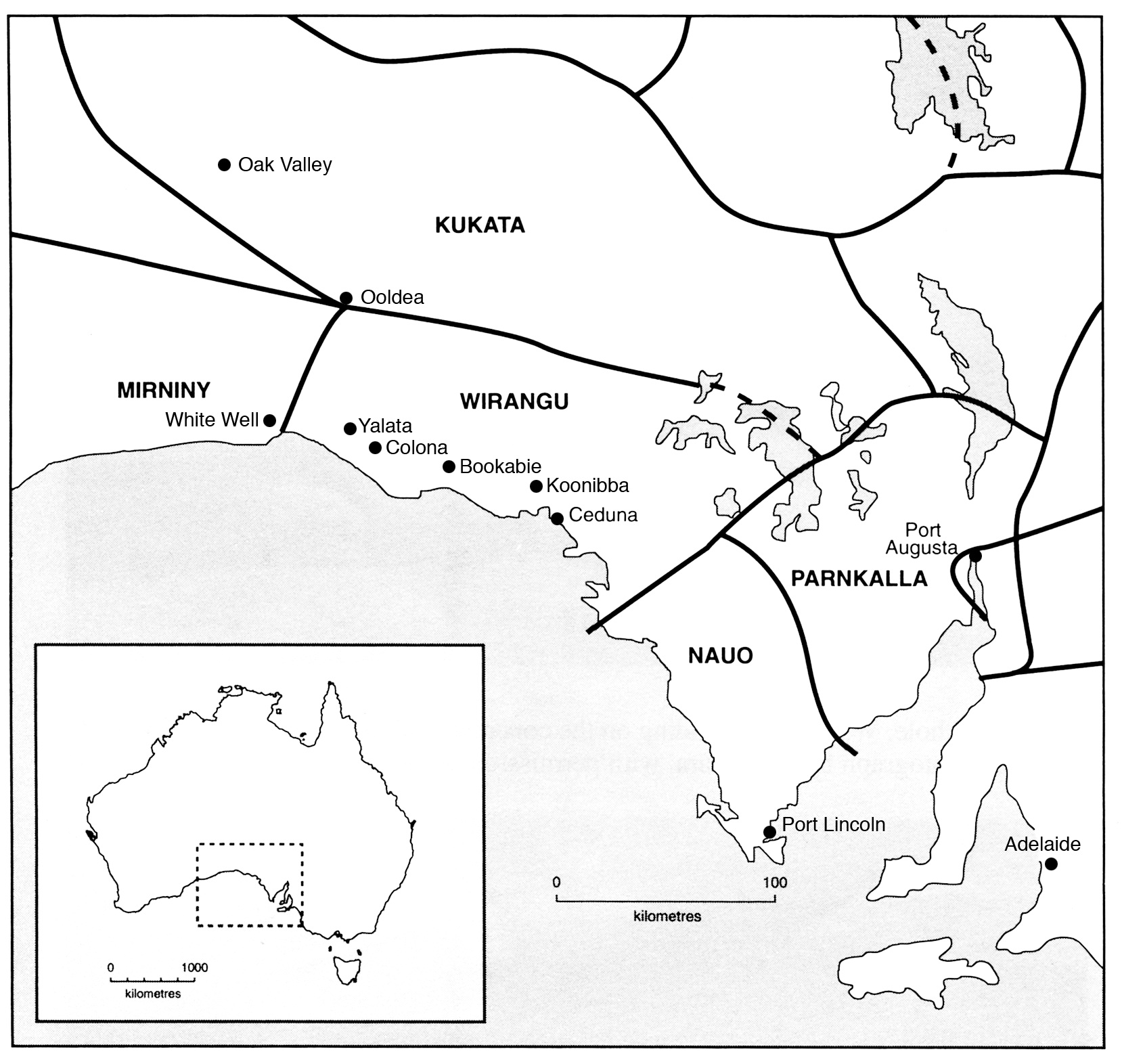
- Tribal boundaries, after Tindale (1974), adapted from Hercus (1999)

The Kokatha language, also written Kukatha, Kokata, Gugada, and other variants, and also referred to as Madutara, Maduwonga, Nganitjidi, Wanggamadu, and Yallingarra and variant spellings of these, is an Australian Aboriginal language of the Western Desert group traditionally spoken by the Kokatha people, whose traditional lands are in the western part of the state of South Australia, north of the Wirangu people.

== Country ==
Kokatha was historically spoken in northern western areas of South Australia.

Norman Tindale recorded Kokatha speakers at Tarcoola, Kingoonya, Pimba, and McDouall Peak; west to Ooldea; north to Stuart Range and Lake Phillipson. At the time of first European contact, their lands appeared to centre on Mount Eba, covering surrounding land to Kingoonya, Tarcoola, Coober Pedy and possibly Ooldea.

Today, Kokatha people live in Ceduna, Koonibba, Port Augusta, Adelaide and other places around the state.

== Classification ==
Kokatha is a dialect of the Western Desert language group, closely related to other dialects in the group. It is to be distinguished from the two other Western Desert dialects known as Kokatja or Kukatja dialect (A68 and C7 in AUSTLANG).

Kokatha has also been grouped as a Far West Coast language, together with Mirning and Wirangu.

In 1972, linguist John Platt published a grammar of the Kokatha language. Platt distinguished two types, Gugada and Gugadja, with Gugadja more like Western Desert than Gugada, which he thought was linked more closely to Wirangu. As of 2020 the distinctions between the two are not clear, but both remain classified as Kokatha by AIATSIS in their AUSTLANG database.

== Phonology ==
=== Consonants ===
	Peripheral		Laminal		Apical	
	Labial	Velar	Dental	Palatal	Alveolar	Retroflex
Plosive	p	k	t̪	(c)	t	ʈ
Nasal	m	ŋ	n̪	(ɲ)	n	ɳ
Lateral			l̪	(ʎ)	l	ɭ
Rhotic					ɾ	
Approximant	w			j		ɻ

- Sounds /t̪, n̪, l̪/ are only heard when preceding vowels /a, aː, u, uː/, when preceding /i, iː/ they are always palatal as [c, ɲ, ʎ].
- Stop sounds are voiced as [b, ɡ, d̪~ɟ, d, ɖ] when preceded by a nasal, and sometimes in intervocalic positions.
- The flap sound /ɾ/ may also be heard as an alveolar glide [ɹ] in free variation. It may also be heard as a trill [r] in emphatic speech.
- Sounds /ɲ, ŋ/ when in word-final position, may vary between being heard as voiced or voiceless [ɲ̊, ŋ̊].

=== Vowels ===
	Front	Back
High	i iː	u uː
Low	a aː	

- /i/ can also be heard as [ɪ] in stressed syllables or in word-final position, and as [ɪə̆] when emphasized before a retroflex consonant.
- /a/ may also be heard as fronted [æ] when after /j/ or other palatal/dental phonemes, as [ɔ] when before or after /w/, as [ʌ] when in open word-final position, and as back [ɑ] in primary stressed syllables or before a retroflex consonant as well as being heard as [ɑə̆] when emphasized before a retroflex consonant.
- /u/ may also be heard as [ʊ] when in word-final position or before a retroflex or nasal consonant, as [o] when between velar consonants or before /w/, as [ə] when in the second syllable of words with three or more syllables, or as [ʊə̆] when emphasized before a retroflex or nasal consonant.

== Overlap with other languages ==
People from Kokatha, Mirning and Wirangu language groups lived at Koonibba Mission from around 1900, and many loan words moved among the languages there and across the region. A wordlist compiled by Pastor August Hoff, Superintendent of Koonibba Mission from 1920 to 1930, between 1920 and 1952 and published by his son Lothar in 2004, included words from the Wirangu, Kokatha and Pitjantjatjara languages.

According to Kokatha woman Dylan Coleman in her 2010 PhD thesis, Luise Hercus' work entitled A grammar of the Wirangu language from the west coast of South Australia (1999) was based on the words spoken by two fluent Kokatha speakers, who were Coleman's grandmothers. They believed that their input was part of the work to create a Kokatha dictionary, and refuted Hercus' claim that the language was Wirangu, as they had been taught Kokatha language and culture by Kokatha elders for generations.

== Language revival ==
The Mobile Language Team works with the Far West Language Centre in Ceduna in researching the Kokatha language and performing other language-related activities.
