= Koonibba Test Range =

Commercial rocket test range in western South Australia

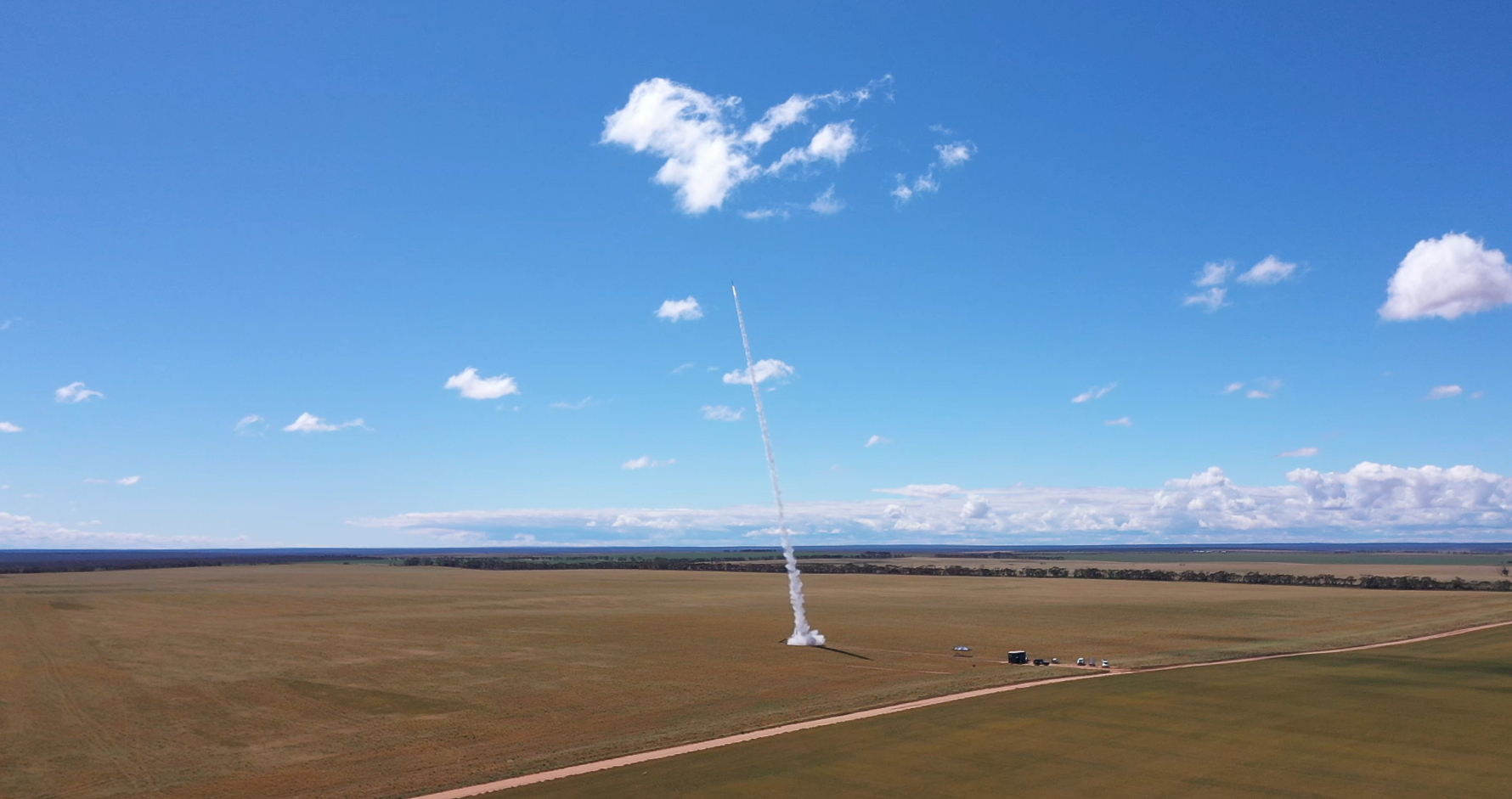
- TED-02 Launch, September 2020
- Interactive map of Koonibba Test Range
- Location: Koonibba, South Australia
- Coordinates: 31.885558°S 133.448686°E
- Operator: Southern Launch
- Total launches: 5
- Launch pad: 1
Launch history
- Status: Active
- First launch: 19 September 2020; T-Minus DART / TED-01
- Last launch: 27 November 2025; A01 / A01

The Koonibba Test Range is a rocket test range site near the township of Koonibba in the far west of South Australia. Rockets are launched to the north over a clear area – the Yumbarra Conservation Park and Yellabinna Wilderness Protection Area – for 145 kilometres (90 mi).

Koonibba Test Range was reported in 2020 to be the world's largest privately owned rocket test range and the world's first permitted by an indigenous community to be launched from their land. The range allows companies, universities, space agencies and other organisations to pay for their rockets to be taken to the site, launched, and rockets and payloads to be recovered.

== History ==
In 2019 and 2020, the private space company Southern Launch consulted with the Koonibba Community Aboriginal Corporation, an Aboriginal corporation, before developing the test range site. Members of the local community have been employed to set up and operate the range.

DEWC Systems, an Adelaide-based company, conducted two launches at the range in September 2020. A rocket containing a small replica payload was scheduled to be launched on 15 September 2020, with a second launch on 19 September. The first launch failed, but both launches were successful on the morning of 19 September 2020. It was aimed at collecting information to develop a new technology consisting of tiny cube-shaped satellites, known as cubesats, for electronic warfare. The training and employment opportunities were welcomed by the community.

In October 2023 it was reported that Varda Space Industries had reached an agreement with Southern Launch to reenter and land their second mission at the Koonibba Test Range, due to launch mid-2024.

On 3 May 2024, HyImpulse's SR75 suborbital rocket flew its maiden launch (mission titled "Light this Candle"; expected apogee: 200 km (120 mi)) successfully from Koonibba. The German-made hybrid-propellant rocket was fueled by candle wax, and was the biggest spacecraft launched on Australian soil.

On 27 November 2025, ATSpace, the Australian subsidiary of tiSpace, launched its in-house-built A01 sounding rocket. The vehicle recorded a flight duration of approximately four and half minutes and reached an apogee close to 80 km.

== Description ==
Koonibba Test Range covers 41,000 km^{2} (16,000 sq mi), making it the largest launch pad in the Southern Hemisphere. It is situated in an uninhabited conservation park about 40 kilometres (25 mi) north-west of Ceduna, and intended for use launching and recovering rockets and for space research. The advantage of the site is that the land on which the rockets may be recovered is vast.

== Community impact and response ==
Most of the 125 residents of Koonibba, who had been involved in negotiations with the launch company over the six years prior, supported the launch. In May 2024 it was reported that the facility was delivering educational benefits for local schools; a group of Koonibba Aboriginal School students, assisted by Southern Launch engineers and technicians, had developed rockets, later presenting their work at a STEM conference in Adelaide, and intended to continue to do so. Koonibba Aboriginal Community Council reported that jobs in training and traffic management had been created. there were plans to build a space observatory to attract tourists.

Some local people are concerned about the impact of the rockets on sacred women's sites, and the next generation's connection to country. Sue Coleman-Haseldine, a Kokatha elder, has protested with a small group. Her concerns relate to the possible contribution by the launch pad to the development of weapons technology. She was born at Koonibba Mission in the generation that was affected by the British nuclear tests at Maralinga and Emu Field in the 1950s, and is one of the custodians of the land, with a duty to protect the land, animals, and stories, such as the Seven Sisters songline, a creation story in Aboriginal Australian mythology.
