= Taiwan Typhoon and Flood Research Institute =

Institute in the city of Taichung, Taiwan

- Founder: Government of Taiwan
- Established: 2011
- Owner: Ministry of Science and Technology (Taiwan)
- Location: Taichung, Taiwan
- Dissolved: 2018

The Taiwan Typhoon and Flood Research Institute (TTFRI) was a research institute which is part of the National Applied Research Laboratories of Taiwan. It was merged into the National Science and Technology Center for Disaster Reduction in 2018.

== History ==
The Taiwan Typhoon and Flood Research Institute was inaugurated in 2011 in the city of Taichung. Lee Cheng-shang was the inaugural Director.

TTFRI is a coordinator of research into quantitative precipitation forecasting.

TTFRI has worked with the Central Weather Bureau to develop a radar assimilation system which has increased the accuracy of the six hour rainfall forecast by twenty percent.

In 2018 TTFRI began a project to improve the flood management of Cayo District in Belize in partnership with the Belizean Government which is one of Taiwan's few remaining official diplomatic allies.

== Equipment ==
In 2015 TTFRI acquired a set of UAVs from Australia for use their typhoon research program. Early attempts to acquire UAVs in 2005 were scrapped due to stricter air traffic controls imposed as a result of global terrorism.
