= Will Bruey =

American aerospace engineer (born 1988)

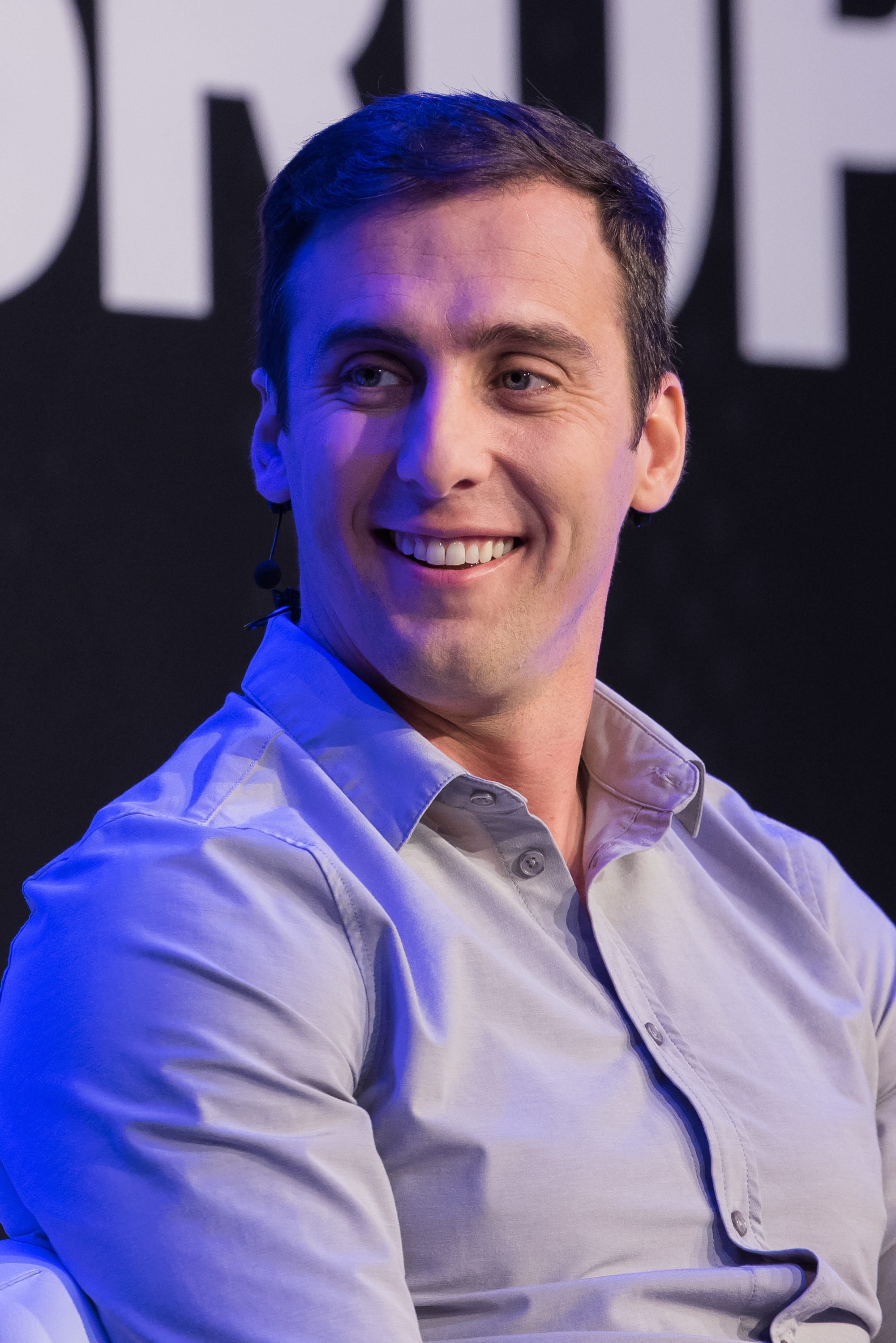
- Bruey in 2025
- Born: 1988 (age 37–38); Lancaster, Pennsylvania, U.S.
- Education: Cornell University (BS, MS)
- Occupation: CEO
- Organizations: Varda; SpaceX; Merrill Lynch; Also Capital

William P. Bruey (born 1988) is an American aerospace engineer. He co-founded Also Capital in 2019 and is co-founder and CEO of Varda Space Industries since 2020.

== Early life and education ==
Bruey was born in 1989 and raised in Lancaster, Pennsylvania. Since childhood, he had the desire to be an astronaut. He earned a bachelor's degree in engineering physics in 2011 and a master's degree in systems engineering in 2012 from Cornell University.

== Career ==
While in college, Bruey worked at Space Systems Loral as an electrical systems engineer, where he contributed to the data handling system for ViaSat-1. As a student, he also built a power controller system for drawing vacuum on Cornell University's synchrotron particle accelerator.

He joined SpaceX in June of 2012 as a hardware development engineer on Falcon 9. He designed communication protocols for avionics on the rocket and was responsible for the integration of the first cameras on Falcon as hardware development lead. Bruey was also a lead avionics engineer on the Dragon 1 and Dragon 2 programs. He was a primary mission control operator on eight missions to the International Space Station (ISS). In 2014, he received a NASA Achievement Award for developing the video system that provides visual feedback during robotics operations on the ISS.

Bruey co-founded Second Order Effects, an engineering consulting firm specialized in electrical and embedded systems, with Dennis Fong, another SpaceX avionics engineer, in 2016. In 2018, Bruey left SpaceX and joined Merrill Lynch, the wealth management division of Bank of America, to serve as director of global equities technology in New York City. The next year, he co-founded and served as a partner at Also Capital, a venture capital fund in New York focused on early-stage investments in hardware technology companies.

After meeting Delian Asparouhov from Founders Fund in 2019 and developing a concept for microgravity manufacturing, Bruey co-founded Varda with Asparouhov and Daniel Marshall. Their goal was to build a commercial space company to develop space manufacturing for materials and pharmaceuticals in space. The company, initially headquartered in Torrance, California, raised US$187 million from Founder's Fund, Khosla Ventures, Lux Capital, and Also Capital.

As of 2026, Varda is headquartered in El Segundo, California and is valued at US$887.4 million.

== Personal life ==
Beginning in high school, Bruey built a Cozy MK IV single engine experimental aircraft. He has a private pilot license and is PADI certified. He resides in Santa Monica, California.

== Awards ==
- NASA Achievement Award (2014)

== See also ==
- Varda Space Industries
- Founders Fund
