= Varda Space Industries =

American space manufacturing company

Varda Space Industries, Inc
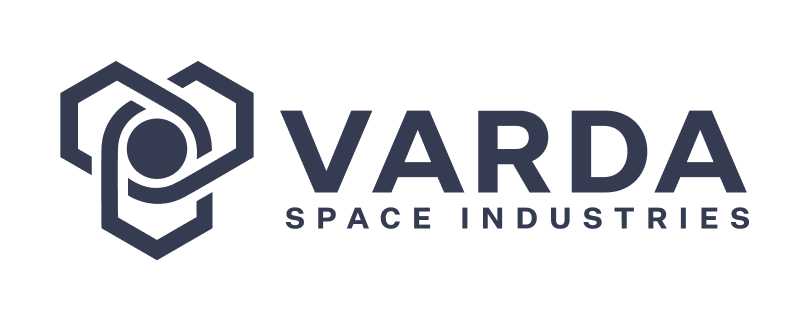
- Type: Private
- Industry: Space
- Founded: January 2021; 5 years ago
- Founders: Will Bruey; Delian Asparouhov
- Headquarters: El Segundo, California, United States
- Key people: Delian Asparouhov (president); Will Bruey (CEO)
- Products: W-Series reentry capsule
- Number of employees: 140 (2025)
- Website: varda.com

Varda Space Industries, Inc is an American privately held space research company headquartered in El Segundo, California. Founded in January 2021, the company designs, builds, and flies spacecraft that process pharmaceuticals in microgravity. The company targets small molecule crystallization, which is difficult to produce in Earth's gravity, and brings those crystals back to Earth with their atmospheric reentry vehicle. Investors in the company include venture capitalists such as Khosla Ventures and Peter Thiel's Founders Fund.

== History ==
Varda Space was founded in January 2021 by Will Bruey and Delian Asparouhov. Will Bruey is a former electrical engineer of SpaceX, and Delian Asparouhov is a partner with Founders Fund. Varda Space Industries began designing their first generation of space vehicles in January 2021 to manufacture new materials in microgravity and send those materials back to Earth in a reentry capsule. Manufacturing materials in the microgravity environment, and absence of dust particles, is beneficial for certain pharmaceuticals, fiber optics, and computer chips. In July 2021, Varda Space received US$42 million in a funding round from various venture capitalists, after receiving US$9 million in an initial funding round in December 2020. The company announced that it raised another US$90 million in April 2024.

In August 2021, Varda Space Industries announced it had signed a contract with Rocket Lab to acquire three Photon satellite buses, with an option to purchase a fourth, to support their initial missions. The first bus was delivered in Q2 2023. In October 2021, Varda selected SpaceX as a launch provider for the first four launches.

Varda Space launched its first 300 kg (660 lb) spacecraft on Falcon 9's Transporter-8 mission in June 2023. Varda's first spacecraft is focused on demonstrating the ability to produce pharmaceuticals in microgravity. Returning the capsule to Earth was planned for mid-August 2023. Varda Space launched the first vehicle with approval from both the Federal Aviation Administration (FAA) and SpaceX to launch with the understanding Varda, the FAA, and the landing site at the Utah Test and Training Range would deliver a reentry license before the proposed reentry date. The first proposed reentry date was denied on 6 September 2023, due to issues between the FAA regulatory requirements and the landing site. Varda subsequently started exploring options to direct capsule reentry to the Koonibba Test Range in Australia. However, on 14 February 2024, Varda was successfully granted a re-entry license by the FAA, and Winnebago-1 reentered on US soil on 21 February 2024 at 21:40 UTC.

Varda became a unicorn in 2025 after it raised $187 million.

== Facilities ==
Varda has offices in Washington, D.C., and El Segundo, California. Its El Segundo production facility is where vehicles, equipment, and materials are built, integrated, and tested. Varda's headquarters houses a pharmaceutical laboratory, as well as a hypergravity crystallization platform, a screening tool for the crystallization of small-molecule pharmaceuticals.

== W-Series re-entry capsule ==
Varda's W-Series capsule is an autonomous free-flying microgravity formulation platform intended for terrestrial landing. The W-Series capsule reenters the Earth's atmosphere at approximately orbital velocity (≈8 km/s). The capsule touches down on land via a parachute. The W-Series capsules’ heatshields are made of C-PICA (Conformal Phenolic Impregnated Carbon Ablator), a thermal protection material produced by NASA Ames Research Center. The material was originally developed at Ames, and the reentry of W-1 marked the first time a NASA-manufactured C-PICA heat shield ever returned from space. Varda was the first company to receive a special vehicle operator license under FAA Part 450. The license, issued for the W-4 mission, allows the company to reenter W-series capsules without resubmitting safety documentation for each flight. It remains valid through 2029, after which Varda will need to renew it. Since the W-4 mission, all of Varda's vehicles have used an in-house satellite bus. Since vertically integrating, the company now builds all aspects of the W-Series vehicles: the capsules, pharmaceutical processing hardware, C-PICA heat shields, and satellite buses.

=== W-1 ===
Varda's W-1 capsule was the first commercial spacecraft to land on a military test range, the first to land on US soil, and was also the first spacecraft approved to reenter under the FAA's Part 450 license. Varda demonstrated the pharmaceutical processing equipment inside W-1 by growing crystals of Form III of the antiretroviral drug ritonavir.

=== W-2 ===
Varda's W-2 capsule launched in January 2025, aboard SpaceX's Transporter-12 rideshare mission with payloads from the Air Force Research Laboratory and NASA. Notably, W-2 contained an optical emission spectroscopy (OES) payload called the Optical Sensing of Plasmas in the ReEntry Environment (OSPREE) experiment, built to conduct in situ spectroscopic measurements of the shock layer during reentry. On 28 February 2025, Varda Space successfully landed the reentry capsule at the Koonibba Test Range in South Australia, delivering critical data that could advance in-space manufacturing and hypersonic technologies. The OSPREE payload successfully obtained in situ shock layer radiative emission measurements at high resolution, elucidating time evolving reentry thermochemistry and providing spectroscopic data not seen in prior open scientific literature, marking a historic reentry experiment. This data is being used to validate state-of-the-art aerothermodynamic models used to design modern reentry systems.

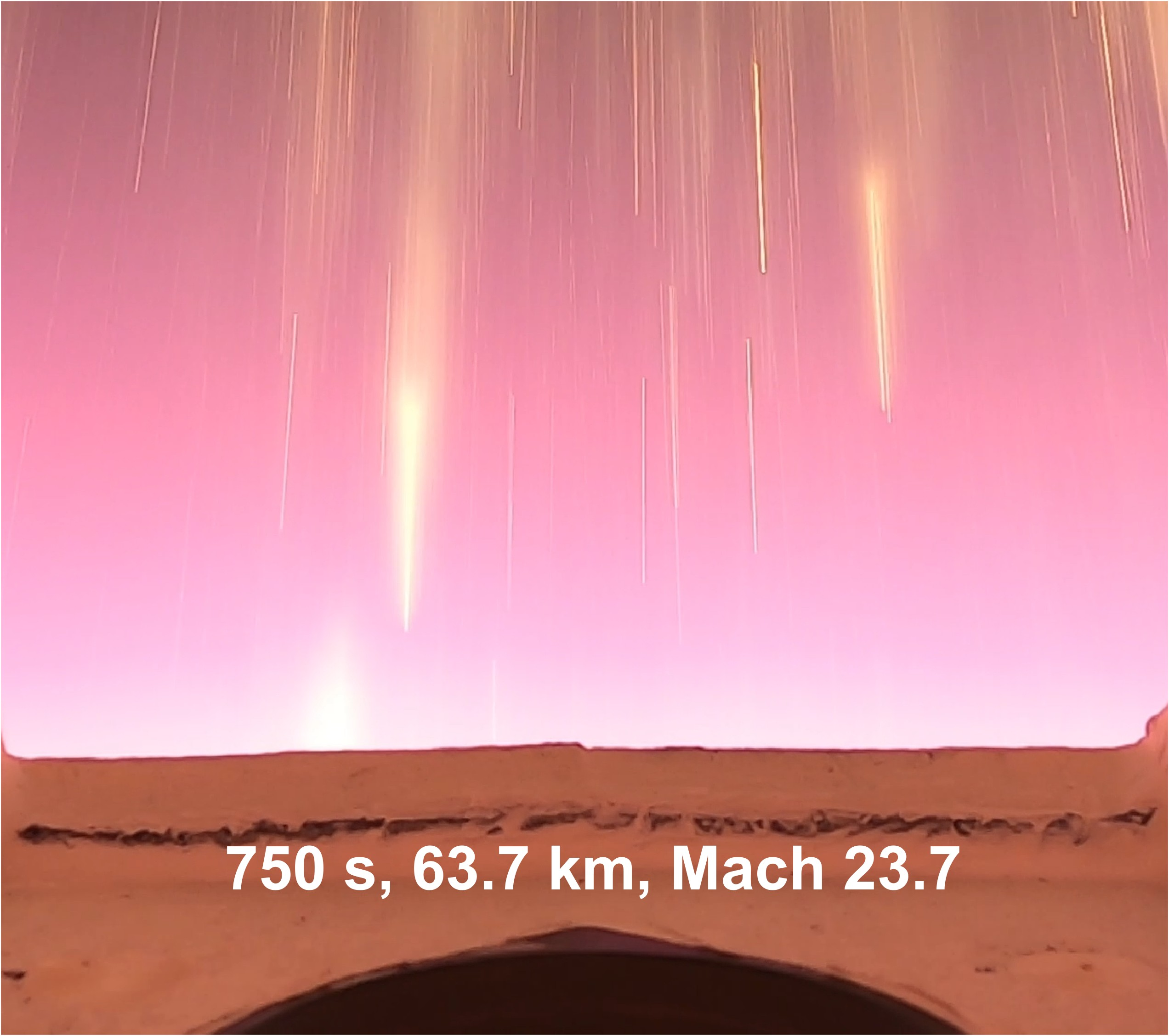
GoPro frame taken from optical window of the W-2 spacecraft showing shock layer radiation and spall from PICA heatshield.

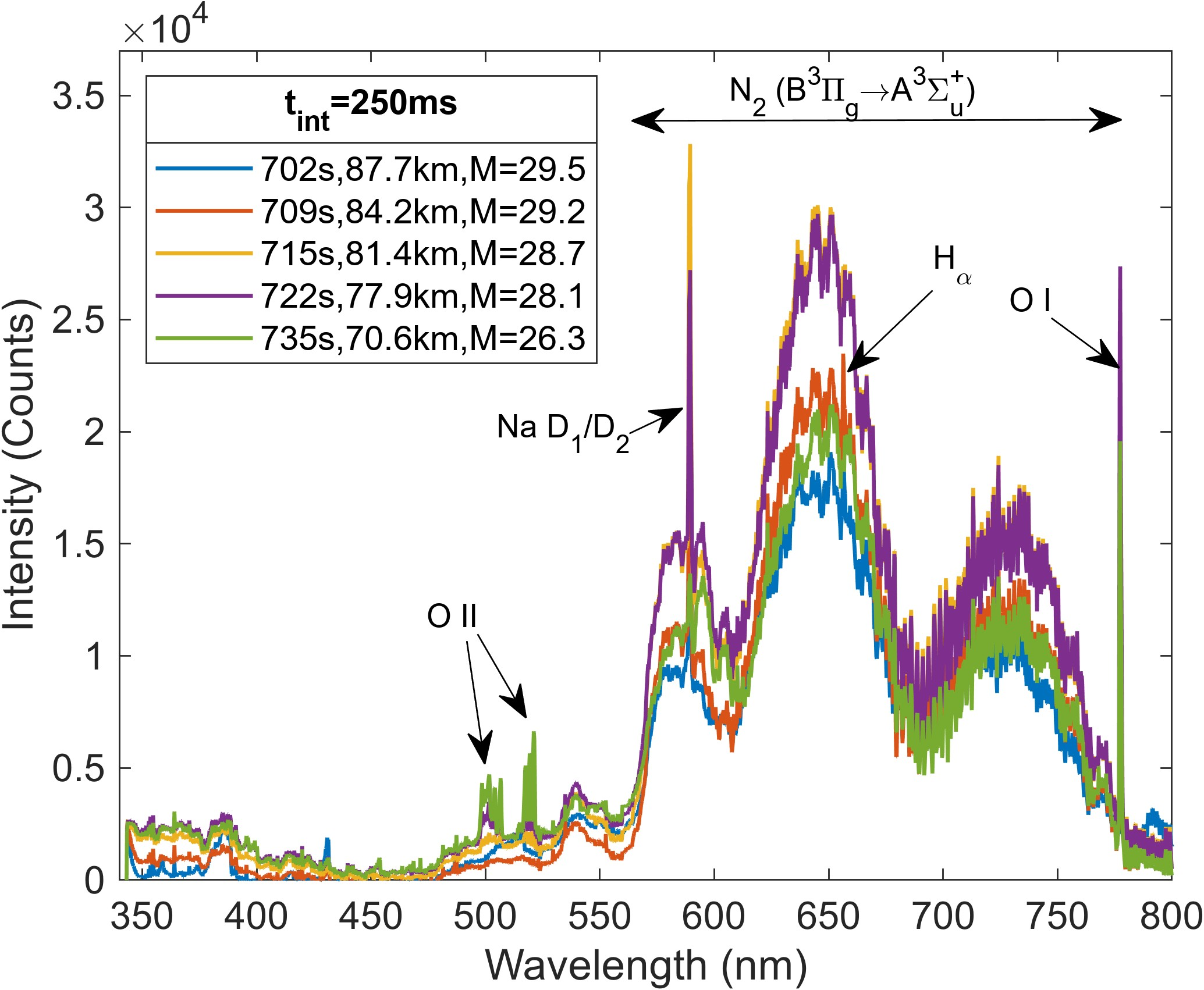
Optical emission spectra taken aboard Varda's W-2 spacecraft by OSPREE.

=== W-3 ===
Varda's W-3 capsule launched on 14 March 2025, aboard SpaceX's Transporter 13 rideshare mission, and reentered on 14 May 2025 at the Koonibba Test Range in South Australia.

=== W-4 ===
Varda's W-4 capsule launched on 24 June 2025, aboard SpaceX's Transporter 14 rideshare mission. W-4 used a Varda-developed spacecraft bus for the first time. Failed to properly re-enter, ultimately burned up in the Earth's atmosphere on 22 May 2026.

=== W-5 ===
Varda's W-5 capsule was launched on 28 November 2025 aboard SpaceX's Transporter-15 with an updated 'next-generation' satellite bus with improvements learned from W-4 and re-entered on 29 January 2026.

=== W-6 ===
Varda's W-6 capsule launched on 30 March 2026 aboard SpaceX's Transporter-16 and re-entered on 18 May 2026.

== See also ==
- Space Forge
- Space manufacturing
