= Kokatha =

Aboriginal Australian people

The Kokatha, also known as the Kokatha Mula, (Note: The variation between these ethnonyms, Kukata/Kokata and Kokatha, may represent an original difference between two distinct Western desert dialects, one retaining a voiceless alveolar stop (t), the other a dental stop (th) (Platt 1972, pp. 3–4; Clendon 2015, p. 27)) are an Aboriginal Australian people of the state of South Australia. They speak the Kokatha language, close to or a dialect of the Western Desert language.

== Country ==
Traditional Kokatha lands extend over some 140,000 km^{2} (54,000 sq mi) according to the estimation of Norman Tindale, stretching over some of the harshest and most waterless land on the Australian continent. They include Tarcoola, Kingoonyah, Pimba and the McDouall Peak as well as modern townships of Roxby Downs and Woomera. The lands extend west as far as Ooldea and the Ooldea Range while the northern frontier runs up to the Stuart Range and Lake Phillipson. Their boundary with Barngarla lands is marked by an ecological transition from their plateau to the lower hilly acacia scrubland and salt lake zones running south to the coast.

The tribes bordering on Kokatha lands were, running north clockwise, the Pitjantjara, the Yankuntjatjarra, the Antakirinja, the Arabana and Kuyani to their east, the Barngarla on the southeastern flank, the Wirangu directly south, the Mirning southwest, and the Ngalia to their west.

According to the Kokatha Aboriginal Corporation (as of October 2020):

The Kokatha People are the traditional owners of a large area of land in the northern region of South Australia, estimated to extend over some 140,000 km^{2} (54,000 sq mi). Traditionally the Kokatha people have been associated with the land that is to the north of Port Augusta, stretching from Lake Torrens in the east to the Gawler Ranges in the West. This includes the land surrounding BHP's Olympic Dam mine project located at Roxby Downs and Oz Minerals' copper-gold project at Carrapateena mine.

== Mythology ==
Traditions concerning Orion, a hunter and the Pleiades, a group of women he pursues, are ubiquitous throughout Australia. One story transmitted in Kokatha oral lore concerns a celestial hunter, Nyeeruna, who lusts after and pursues the Yugarilya sisters, who resist his bold advances, protected by the eldest one, the taunting Kambugudha. A firefight ensues, as Nyeeruna conjures up with a club in his right hand fire-magic to overcome the elder sister, who in turns responds by stirring fire-magic from her left foot, and thereby kicking dust in Nyeeruna's face. Momentarily humiliated, Nyeeruna manages to repeat his magical trick, and Kambugudha, who cannot repeat her magic as quickly, calls on Babba, the father of a pack of dingos, to fight Nyeeruna. Eventually a set of dingo puppies forms a line to separate Nyeeruna from the sisters.

Recently the astronomer Duane Hamacher has advanced the hypothesis that the narrative encodes star-lore, and that the story can be read as a description of the nature of the configuration of stars around Orion, whose name likewise comes from a Greek hunter. In this reading, the Yugarilya sisters represent the Pleiades; Kambugudha the star-cluster of the Hyades; Nyeeruna's right hand's use of fire denoting the behaviour of Betelgeuse, while Kambugudha's counter-tactic of recourse to a similar fire-magic would allude to Aldebaran. The difference in the respective fire-power would reflect the fact that while Betelgeuse has a luminosity that regularly pulses by one magnitude every 400 days, Aldebaran's light variation is less regular, and of a lower magnitude (0.2). The dingo puppy barrier would be emblematic of 15 Orionis and the contiguous star cluster of π^{1,2,3,4,5} etc. The Ngarrindjeri have a similar tradition.

== Native title ==
The Kokatha Aboriginal Corporation is the Registered Native Title Body Corporate (RNTBC) which covers areas determined to belong to the Kokatha people by the Native Title Act 1993, and represents the interests of the Kokatha people.As of 2020, there have been three native title determinations relating to the Kokatha in South Australia:

- An Indigenous land use agreement (ILUA) was determined for the Gawler Ranges area, agreed on 13 June 2010.
- A native title claim lodged by the Far West Coast Aboriginal Corporation RNTBC (representing a number of other peoples as well as the Kokatha nation) was determined on 5 December 2013, and covers land within the Pastoral Unincorporated Area as well as the District Council of Ceduna. This land lies along a wide strip extending inland from the coast, stretching from the border with Western Australia in the west across to a line roughly direct north of the western top edge of the Eyre Peninsula. It excludes a number of areas where native title has been extinguished. There is also an ILUA covering this area, agreed on 22 May 2014.
- The second, determined on 1 September 2014, covers an area within the Roxby Council and some Pastoral Unincorporated Area. It stretches from the eastern shore of Lake Torrens almost to the western shore of Lake Gairdner, but does not include the latter.

An ILUA covers the precise description of the area of land, which is described as "about 30,372 km^{2} (11,727 sq mi) extending approx. 129 kilometres (80 mi) west of Lake Torrens". Large areas within the Woomera Prohibited Area of the RAAF Woomera Range Complex overlap with the native title area.

== Significant sites ==
The dunes and trees of the area within Woomera are considered sacred to the Kokatha people, being linked to their Tjukurpa (Dreaming) stories, in particular that of the Seven Sisters creation story. In particular, the black oak trees are relate to male Kokatha connections to this storyline. The area is supposed to be cleaned by the Department of Defence and the trees protected when weapons testing is under way. However, debris has been found around the site.

There are also a number of significant and rare archaeological sites which are remnants of previous Kokatha habitation within the weapons testing range, which are described in a 2020 heritage management plan prepared for the Department of Defence by GML Heritage Consultants. There are at least 14 separate stone foundations at Lake Hart North (which is not used by the department), which the archaeologists surmised were either "habitation structures" or "low-walled hunting hides".

At another location, Wild Dog Creek, there are a number of rock engravings in the Panaramitee Style (generally dated to the Pleistocene, 10,000 years ago), created by chipping away the rock with sharp tools. Other Aboriginal Australian rock art exists throughout the area, including at Lake Hart, portraying, among other things, footprints which match the Genyornis, a giant bird that went extinct thousands of years ago.

The report states that the location was likely "inhabited and used for many thousands of years", informally dated to up to 50,000 years ago (similar to human habitation in the nearby Flinders Ranges), and the sites could provide hitherto unknown cultural information about the Australian desert area.

== Alternative names ==
- Cocotah, Kookata, Cookutta, Kookatha
- Gawler Range tribe
- Geebera
- Gogada
- Gugada
- Kakarrura. (as karkurera ="east") applied to a band west of Lake Torrens.
- Keibara. ( "plain turkeys"— pejorative)
- Kokatja. (Yankuntjatjarra pronunciation)
- Koogatho, Kugurda, Koogurda, Koocatho
- Koranta
- Kotit-ta
- Kukataja
- Kukatha, Kukata, Kokata
- Madutara. (Antakirinja exonym)
- Maduwonga. (Arabana, also Jangkundjara exonym)
- Nganitjiddia, Nganitjidi, Nganitjini. (Nauo and Barngarla exonym meaning "those who sneak and kill by night.")
- Yallingarra (cf. alindjara ="east").

Source: Tindale 1974, p. 213

== Notable people ==
- Patty Mills, Australian basketballer
- Gavin Wanganeen, Australian rules footballer, and Brownlow medallist
- David Arden, Songman who won The National Indigenous Arts Awards, The 'Fellowships' Award, and a VIPA Song Of The Year Award For The Song "Freedom Called"
- Norah Wilson (1901–1971), community worker
- Frances Rings, Australian choreographer and dancer

== Sources ==
- "Aboriginal South Australia". Government of South Australia. Archived from the original on 1 May 2013.
- "AIATSIS map of Indigenous Australia". AIATSIS. 28 July 2023.
- Bates, Daisy (1918). "Aborigines of the West Coast of South Australia; vocabularies and ethnological notes". Transactions of the Royal Society of South Australia. 42: 152–167 – via BHL.
- Black, J. M. (1920). "Vocabularies of four South Australian languages, Adelaide, Narrunga, Kukata, and Narrinyeri, with special reference to their speech sounds". Transactions of the Royal Society of South Australia. 44: 76–93 – via BHL.
- Clendon, Mark (2015). Clamor Schürmann's Barngarla grammar: A commentary on the first section of A vocabulary of the Parnkalla language. University of Adelaide Press. ISBN 978-1-925-26111-0.
- Condon, H. T. (July 1955a). "Aboriginal bird names -South Australia Part 1" (PDF). South Australian Ornithologist. 21 (6/7). Adelaide: 74–88.
- "Extract from the Register of Land Use Agreements: SI2014/11 Kokatha Native Title Claim Settlement ILUA" (PDF). National Native Title Tribunal. 2 December 2014.
- Eylmann, Erhard (1908). Die Eingeborenen der Kolonie Südaustralien (PDF). Berlin: D.Reimer – via Internet Archive.
- Hamacher, Duane W. (8 November 2017). "Stars that vary in brightness shine in the oral traditions of Aboriginal Australians". The Conversation.
- Hamacher, Duane W. (April 2018). "Observations of red-giant variable stars by Aboriginal Australians". The Australian Journal of Anthropology. 29 (2): 89–107. arXiv:1709.04634. Bibcode:2018AuJAn..29...89H. doi:10.1111/taja.12257. hdl:11343/293572. S2CID 119453488.
- "Home". Far West Coast Aboriginal Corporation.
- "Home". Kokatha Aboriginal Corporation. 21 October 2020.
- Howitt, Alfred William (1904). The native tribes of south-east Australia (PDF). Macmillan.
- Jones, F. W.; Campbell, T. D. (1924). "Anthropometric and descriptive observations on some South Australian aborigines". Transactions of the Royal Society of South Australia. 48: 303–312 – via BHL.
- Mathews, R. H. (January 1900a). "Divisions of the South Australian Aborigines". Proceedings of the American Philosophical Society. 39 (161): 78–91+93. JSTOR 983545.
- Mathews, R. H. (October–December 1900b). "The Origin, Organization and Ceremonies of the Australian Aborigines". Proceedings of the American Philosophical Society. 39 (164): 556–578. JSTOR 983776.
- "National Native Title Register Details: SCD2013/002 - Far West Coast". National Native Title Tribunal.Extract from the National Native Title Register
- "National Native Title Register Details: SCD2014/004 - Kokatha People (Part A)". National Native Title Tribunal.Extract from the National Native Title Register
- Platt, John Talbot (1972). An Outline Grammar of the Gugada Dialect: South Australia. Australian Institute of Aboriginal Studies.
- Ralph, Jon (3 June 2010). "Indigenous superman Gavin Wanganeen blazed a trail". Herald Sun. Melbourne.
- "Register of Indigenous Land Use Agreements Details: SI2009/005 - Gawler Ranges - Kokatha Pastoral ILUA". National Native Title Tribunal.
- "Register of Indigenous Land Use Agreements Details: SI2014/003 - Far West Coast Native Title Settlement ILUA". National Native Title Tribunal.
- "Register of Indigenous Land Use Agreements Details: SI2014/011 - Kokatha Native Title Claim Settlement ILUA". National Native Title Tribunal.
- "Search National Native Title Register". National Native Title Tribunal.
- "Search Register of Indigenous Land Use Agreements". National Native Title Tribunal.
- Sullivan, Helen (25 May 2023). "'It's new territory': why is Betelgeuse glowing so brightly and behaving so strangely?". The Guardian.
- Tindale, Norman Barnett (1974). Aboriginal Tribes of Australia: Their Terrain, Environmental Controls, Distribution, Limits, and Proper Names. Australian National University Press. ISBN 978-0-708-10741-6.
- Trask, Steven (22 June 2022a). "Why were missiles being tested 50 metres from trees sacred to Aboriginal people?". SBS News. Special Broadcasting Service.
- Trask, Steven (23 June 2022b). "The significance of these very rare Aboriginal shelters has been revealed". SBS News. Special Broadcasting Service.
- Wilhelmi, Charles (1860). "Manners and customs of the Australian natives, in particular of the Port Lincoln district". Transactions of the Royal Society of Victoria. 5: 164–203. ISBN 978-0-708-10741-6 – via BHL.
