= TiSPACE =

Taiwanese Space Company

Taiwan Innovative Space Inc.
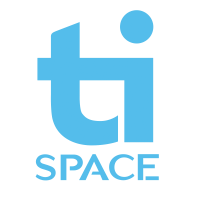
- Industry: Space launch
- Founded: 2016
- Founder: Dr. Yen-Sen Chen
- Headquarters: Chunan, Miaoli County, Taiwan
- Number of employees: 104 (2019)
- Website: www.tispace.com

TiSPACE, officially Taiwan Innovative Space Inc. (Chinese: 台灣晉陞太空股份有限公司), is a space launch company from Taiwan.

== History ==
TiSPACE was founded in 2016 by a group of investors, scientists, and engineers led by Yen-Sen Chen who had previously worked at the NSPO and at NASA’s Marshall Space Flight Center. In 2019 they signed an MOU with National Central University to promote domestic space launch and the space technology sector. They also attended the International Astronautical Congress, a first for a Taiwanese company.

TiSPACE scrapped their launch facility in Taiwan due to legal issues. In August 2021 TiSPACE announced plans to launch from the Whalers Way Orbital Launch Complex in Australia rather than Taiwan. They received the first flight approval permit ever issued by the Australian government.

TiSPACE used the name of a prawn farm as a cover to illegally establish a rocket launch site on indigenous land in Nantian Village, Daren Township, Taitung County, without obtaining the consent of the local Indigenous community. The company was subsequently fined multiple times by the Taitung County Government and ordered to restore the land to its original state. However, by 2024, TiSPACE had not only failed to restore the land but had also added new buildings and expanded the concrete paving, violating the Regional Planning Act. As a result, the former chairman, Li Jinyi, was sentenced to 50 days' imprisonment and fined.

In December 2017, the Taiwan Space Agency (TASA) entered into a NT$54.8 million contract with Taiwan TiSPACE Co., Ltd. for the provision of a multifunctional hybrid sounding rocket launch service, under which TiSPACE was responsible for carrying out the sounding rocket launch mission. TASA disbursed NT$43.84 million over the first five payment milestones in accordance with the contract. However, despite three extensions of the completion deadline, TiSPACE failed to complete the final milestone, which required the sounding rocket flight and submission of the final project report. TASA alleged that TiSPACE had failed to perform the contract as agreed, concealed that it had obtained an Australian launch permit, and reassigned the rocket originally designated for the project to a separate collaboration with a third party. TASA subsequently terminated the contract and sought restitution of the payments made together with liquidated damages. TiSPACE argued that the delays were attributable to the Australian regulatory approval process, international political circumstances, and TASA's failure to deliver the scientific payload in a timely manner. The Hsinchu District Court held that the agreement was a contract for work, found that TiSPACE had failed to perform its principal contractual obligations, concealed material information regarding its performance, and diverted the rocket to another project, constituting a material breach of contract. The court ruled that TASA had lawfully terminated the contract within the statutory period and ordered TiSPACE to return the payments received and pay liquidated damages, totaling NT$54.8 million plus statutory interest. The judgment remains subject to appeal.

== Facilities ==
Structural dynamics tests are performed at the National Center for Research on Earthquake Engineering.

=== Hot fire test facility ===
TiSPACE conducts engine tests at its vertical hot fire test facility.

=== Nantian launch facility ===
TiSPACE’s launch facility is located in the Nantian are of Taitung county. According to TiSPACE the facility features "launch pad, launch support rail, an oxidizer filling facility, vehicle/payload assembly building, launch command center, and tracking/communication antenna."

== Launch vehicles ==
=== HAPITH I (Kestrel I) ===
HAPITH I (known as Kestrel I when operated by ATSpace) is a two stage sub-orbital rocket designed to validate TiSPACE's hybrid-propellant rocket system. The HAPITH I has 100% domestically sourced components. Hapith is Saisiyat for flying squirrel.

The first launch of the HAPITH I was scheduled for December 27, 2019 but was called off after protest from the local indigenous community. With the blessings of the community the launch was rescheduled for February 13 and was to include a Paiwan blessing of the rocket. The February 13 launch was scrubbed due to weather. As of August 2021, the first launch of HAPITH I was scheduled to take place at Whalers Way Orbital Launch Complex, South Australia, in late 2021.

On 16 September 2021, 06:39 UTC the Hapith I rocket (flight VS01) launched from Whalers Way Pad 1 on a suborbital test flight. This was the maiden flight of Hapith I and first of three test launches from Pad 1 at Whalers Way. The rocket started to climb off the launch pad, but caught fire and fell over, supposedly due to pipework failure. Fire was Intended apogee of the flight was 250 km (160 mi). As payload the rocket carried an Ionosphere Scintillation Package (ISP) for NSPO for the purpose of Ionospheric scintillation research.

Two more test launches of the vehicle, conducted by ATSpace under the Kestrel I name, are scheduled for late 2022.

HAPITH I has two stages; the first stage has 4 motors, and the second stage has a single motor. All motors are similar, having a composite outer shell with styrene-butadiene rubber as fuel and nitrous oxide as oxidizer.

=== HAPITH V ===
The HAPITH V is a three stage orbital rocket in development from the HAPITH I with an approximate height of 20 m, a diameter of 2.2 m, and a first stage thrust of 650 kN. The target payload is 390 kg to LEO and 350 kg to SSO. It will be TiSPACE’s first commercial offering.

HAPITH V has three stages; the first stage has 5 motors, the second stage has 4 motors, and the third stage has a single motor. All motors are similar, having a composite outer shell with styrene-butadiene rubber as fuel and nitrous oxide as oxidizer.

== See also ==
- List of companies of Taiwan
- NewSpace
- Gilmour Space Technologies
- Advanced Rocket Research Center
- National Chung-Shan Institute of Science and Technology
