= Sir Arthur Clarke Award =

British science award

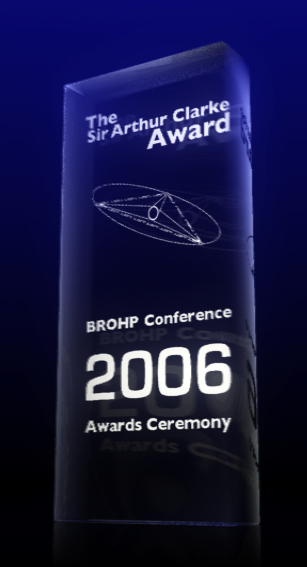
A computer-generated image of the glass award, 2006

The Sir Arthur Clarke Award is a British award given annually since 2005 in recognition of notable contributions to space exploration, particularly British achievements. The awards are presented by the Arthur C. Clarke Foundation, although the selection is delegated to the British Interplanetary Society, with the exception of the International award, whose recipient is voted on by the Foundation Nominations for the awards are made by members of the public, with shortlists drawn up by a panel of judges, who also choose the winner. Sir Arthur C. Clarke chose a special award independently of the public nominations.

== History ==
Founded in 2005, the idea for the awards was proposed by Dave Wright to Jerry Stone, who then suggested they be named after Sir Arthur Clarke. Once permission was granted, Jerry Stone decided what the awards should look like, what categories should be included, and how they should be nominated and judged.

Having obtained Sir Arthur's permission for the awards to bear his name, Jerry Stone decided that the awards should have the same proportions (1:4:9) as the monolith featured in Clarke's 2001: A Space Odyssey, and be made of glass, as the description on the book of 2001 describes 'a crystalline monolith'. This represents Clarke's science fiction work. The award features the diagram Clarke drew in 1945 in order to demonstrate how satellites can provide global communications around the Earth from geostationary orbit, also called the Clarke Orbit. This represents Clarke's science work. It was co-designed by Howard Berry, who suggested the font and lettering style.

Initially the awards were presented at the UK Space Conference (the British Rocketry Oral History Programme until it was renamed in 2008) which was held annually at Charterhouse School, Surrey, from 1998 to 2010. The association with the conference continues but only in alternate years, as the conference has been bi-annual since 2011.

Not all categories are awarded each year; for example, 2008 was the first year in which nominations were shortlisted in the category of Best Film Presentation. An additional award was given in 2007 and 2008 that was named after and presented by George Abbey, the former director of the Johnson Space Center. It was awarded to those "whose space achievement made us laugh the most".

The award ceremony is similar to the Oscars in that multiple awards are given in various categories at the same event, which is different from other awards given in the field. As a result, the awards have been referred to as the Arthurs. The awards are held in high regard by the international Space community:

The Sir Arthur Clarke Awards are held in great esteem and it is a huge honour to have been nominated. It was a fantastic surprise when we heard the news and we are very flattered.

— Dr. Andy Newsam, Director of the National Schools' Observatory, Sir Arthur Clarke award for NSO, 28 March 2008.

This award is very nice... I thank all of you for this grand night and this grand award.

— Ray Bradbury, Sir Patrick Moore and the Sky at Night win Sir Arthur Clarke Awards, Brian May, 19 April 2007.

Due to COVID-19 lockdowns in the United Kingdom, in 2020-21 the Awards could not be run in 2020. Subsequent editions have all been presented the following year, both for consistency and to allow "a full calendar year for achievements to be completed and contributions made".

== 2023–2024 ==
The 2023 awards were conferred on 12 November 2024 at the British Interplanetary Society's Reinventing Space conference at the Royal Aeronautical Society in London. The judges agreed to return to the pre-COVID system where achievements had to be completed between one award ceremony and the next. To realign the award calendar, nominations were for achievements and contributions in the 2023 calendar year through to September 2024, i.e. 21 months, allowing a return to the pre-COVID 12-month cycle in 2025.

Category	Recipient
Industry/Project Team	The Space Cluster & ESA Business Incubation Team
Industry/Project Individual	Andrew Cawthorne, Surrey Satellite Technology
Academic Study/Research Team	The UK Cluster Mission Team
Academic Study/Research Individual	Professor Anthony Illingworth
Education and Outreach Team	The SUN Team
Education and Outreach Individual	Sophie Allan, National Space Academy
Student	Joaquin Perez-Grande
Media, broadcast and written, Team	The 'Our Fragile Space' Team
Media, broadcast and written, Individual	Andy Saunders
Lifetime Achievement	Robert Baldwin
International Achievement	Elisabetta Monnini, Leonardo Italy

== 2022 ==
The 2022 awards were conferred on 13 October 2023 at The Spine in Liverpool, at the conclusion of the Reinventing Space Conference and as part of the 90th anniversary of the founding of the society in Liverpool.

Category	Recipient
Industry/Project Team	The HotSat-1 Project Team, Surrey Satellite Technology Limited
Industry/Project Individual	Daria ‘Dasha’ Filichkina, Co-Founder AstroAgency
Academic Study/Research Team	The UK InSight team, Imperial College London
Academic Study/Research Individual	Professor Giovanna Tinetti, University College London
Education and Outreach Team	The Space Careers UK Team
Education and Outreach Individual	David Evans
Student	Mohamed Sherif Fawzi
Media, broadcast and written, Team	The Aardman Animations’ Shaun the Sheep Team
Media, broadcast and written, Individual	Rob Coppinger, Editor BIS SpaceFlight Magazine
Lifetime Achievement	Professor John Zarnecki, Open University
International Achievement	The NASA Voyager Team

== 2021 ==
The 2021 awards were presented at the Reinventing Space Conference on 30 November 2022 at Bristol Aerospace, in Bristol.

Category	Recipient
Space Achievement – Industry/Project Team	The Astroscale ELSA-D Team
Space Achievement – Industry/Project Individual	Professor Gillian Wright
Space Achievement – Academic Study/Research	[Not awarded]
Space Achievement – Education and Outreach Team	The MajorTimSpace Team
Space Achievement – Education and Outreach Individual	Heidi Thiemann
Space Achievement – Student	Antonio Duduianu
Space Achievement – Media, broadcast and written	The BBC’s Infinite Monkey Cage Team
Lifetime Achievement	Alan Bond
International Achievement	Miss Wally Funk

== 2020 ==
The 2020 awards were presented at the Reinventing Space Conference Gala Dinner on Tuesday 29 June 2021, which was delayed from 2020 due to the COVID-19 pandemic.

Category	Recipient
Space Achievement – Industry/Project Team	The Goonhilly-6 Deep Space Antenna project team
Space Achievement – Industry/Project Individual	Dr. Alice Bunn, UK Space Agency
Space Achievement – Academic Study/Research	Prof. Cathryn Mitchell
Space Achievement – Education and Outreach Team	The SunSpace Art team
Space Achievement – Education and Outreach Individual	Dr. Sheila Kanani
Space Achievement – Student	Áine O’Brien
Space Achievement – Media, broadcast and written	Joanna Durrant
Lifetime Achievement	Jan Wörner and Prof. Richard Crowther
International Achievement	Omran Al Sharaf and the UAE Hope Team

== 2019 ==
The 2019 awards were presented at the Reinventing Space Conference Gala Dinner on Thursday 14 November

Category	Recipient
Space Achievement – Industry/Project Team	RemoveDEBRIS (Simon Fellowes & Prof. Guglielmo Aglietti, University of Surrey)
Space Achievement – Industry/Project Individual	Dr. Jonathan McDowell
Space Achievement – Academic Study/Research	The Queen's University Belfast 'Oumuamua' Team (Prof. Alan Fitzsimmons)
Space Achievement – Education and Outreach Team	Space Rocks (Alexander Milas, Twin V and Mark McCaughrean, ESA)
Space Achievement – Education and Outreach Individual	Helen Schell
Space Achievement – Student	Heidi Thiemann
Space Achievement – Media, broadcast and written	Sue Nelson
Lifetime Achievement	Professor Ken Pounds, University of Leicester
International Achievement	Dr. Alan Stern and the NASA New Horizons team

== 2018 ==
The 2018 awards were presented at a gala dinner at the 2018 Reinventing Space Conference at The Royal Aeronautical Society on Thursday 1 November 2018. The finalists were announced on the BIS website on 7 October.

Category	Recipient
Space Achievement – Industry/Project Team	Oxford Space Systems
Space Achievement – Industry/Project Individual	Magali Vaissière
Space Achievement – Academic Study/Research	The UK Cassini team
Space Achievement – Education and Outreach Team	The ESERO-UK Space Ambassadors
Space Achievement – Education and Outreach Individual	Victoria ‘Vix’ Southgate
Space Achievement – Industry/Project Individual	Dave Honess
Space Achievement – Student	Robert Garner
Space Achievement – Media, broadcast and written	The BBC 2 ‘Astronauts – Do you have what it takes?’ Team
Lifetime Achievement	Richard Peckham
International Achievement	The SpaceX Falcon Team

== 2017 ==
The 2017 awards were presented at a gala dinner at the 2017 UK Space Conference, held at Manchester Central on Wednesday 31 May 2017.

Category	Recipient
Space Achievement – Industry/Project Team (Large Projects)	Airbus Gaia Team
Space Achievement – Industry/Project Team (Small Projects)	Oxford Nanopore Technologies Team
Space Achievement – Industry/Project Individual	Alan Bond, Reaction Engines
Space Achievement – Academic Study/Research	UK Gaia Science Team
Space Achievement – Education and Outreach (Team)	Science Museum Cosmonauts Exhibition Team (Ian Blatchford, Doug Millard, Natalia Sidlina, and Alexandra Smirnova)
Space Achievement – Education and Outreach (Individual)	Kathie Bowden, UK Space Agency
Space Achievement – Student	CranSpace Mars Flyby Team
Space Achievement – Media, broadcast and written	Dallas Campbell, Science Television Presenter
Special Lifetime Space Achievement	Piers Sellers
Lifetime Space Achievement	Paul Flanagan, UKspace
International Achievement	Roy Gibson, First Director General, European Space Agency

== 2016 ==
The 2016 awards were presented at a gala dinner at the 2016 Reinventing Space Conference at The Royal Society on Thursday 27 October 2016. The event was sponsored by the UK Space Agency.

Category	Recipient
Space Achievement – Special Award for Individual Outreach	Tim Peake
Space Achievement – Education and Outreach	The UK Space Agency Principia Education Team
Space Achievement – Media: Broadcast and written	David Shukman, Science Editor, BBC News
Space Achievement – Education	Mike Grocott
Space Achievement – Industry/Project Team	The SSTL Galileo Team
Space Achievement – Industry/Project Individual	Dave Honess
Space Achievement – Academic Study/Research	Dr. Harry Ward and The LISA Pathfinder Team, University of Glasgow
Space Achievement – Student	Joseph Dudley, UKSEDS
Lifetime Achievement	Pat Norris
International Achievement	The Global VSAT Forum

== 2015 ==
The 2015 awards were presented at the UK Space Conference Dinner in St George's Hall, Liverpool on Tuesday 14 July 2015. They were sponsored by the UK Space Agency.

Category	Recipient
Space Achievement – Industry/Project Team	Beagle 2 Team
Space Achievement – Industry/Project Individual	William Marshall, Planet Labs, San Francisco
Space Achievement – Academic Study/Research	The Stardust Team, University Of Strathclyde
Space Achievement – Education and Outreach	The Rosetta/Philae Outreach Team
Space Achievement – Student	King's College London Msc Students
Space Achievement – Media, broadcast and written	Richard Hollingham, BBC Future
Lifetime Achievement	Prof. J L Culhane, Mullard Space
International Achievement	Dr. Burton Edelson

== 2014 ==
The Sir Arthur Clarke Awards 2014 were presented at an event at The Royal Aeronautical Society on Wednesday 8 October 2014, by the Chief Executive of the UK Space Agency, Dr. David Parker.

Category	Recipient
Space Achievement – Industry/Project Team	The ESA/Industry Rosetta Team (members below)
Space Achievement – Industry/Project Individual	John Ellwood – Ex ESA
Space Achievement – Academic Study/Research	Prof. Louise Harra, MSSL, UCL
Space Achievement – Education and Outreach	Dr. Lucie Green, Dept of Space & Climate Physics, MSSL, UCL
Space Achievement – Student	The Cranspace Team: Idriss Sisaid, Enrique Gardia Bourne, Edward Anastassacos
Space Achievement – Media, Broadcast and Written	Arrow Media – "Live from Space" series
Lifetime Achievement	Colin Pillinger, Open University
International Achievement	James Lovelock, Author and proposer of the Gaia hypothesis, UK

The specific ESA/Industry Rosetta team members who received the "Space Achievement - Industry/Project Team" award:

- Dr. Andrea Accomazzo, Rosetta Flight Director, ESOC, Darmstadt
- Dr. Paolo Ferri, Head of Mission Operations, ESOC, Darmstadt
- Dr. Rainer Best, Rosetta Project Manager, Airbus DS, Friedrichshafen
- Hans-Martin Hell, Rosetta Platform Manager, Airbus DS, Friedrichshafen
- Rod Emery, Rosetta UK Platform Project Manager, Airbus DS, Stevenage
- Phil McGoldrick, Rosetta UK Platform Engineering Manager, Airbus DS, Stevenage
- Penny Irvine, Rosetta UK Platform System Engineer, Airbus DS, Stevenage
- Dr. Stephan Ulamec, Philae Project Manager, DLR

== 2013 ==
The 2013 awards were presented at the UK Space Conference at the Glasgow Science Centre, at a black tie dinner on 16 July hosted by Helen Keen. Tim Peake, the UK's ESA astronaut presented the awards to the recipients.

Category	Recipient
Industry/Project Team Award	e2v (presented to Richard Gibbs)
Industry/Project Individual Award	Paul Flanagan of UK Space
Academic Study/Research Award	Herschel-SPIRE Team (presented to Tanya Lim)
Student Award	Rebecca Hayward of Hockerill Anglo European College
Education and Outreach Award	Stuart Eves
Media Award	Ben Gilliland of the Metro newspaper
Lifetime Achievement Award	Professor Alan Wells, University of Leicester
International Award	Dr. Joseph N. Pelton

== 2012 ==
As the UK Space Agency are only planning to run the space conference in alternate years, the 2012 awards were presented at a special event in the Cholmondeley Room at the House of Lords on 26 October 2012. The host was Lord Cobbold and the MC for the event was the impressionist Jon Culshaw.

Category	Recipient
International Award	Jean-Jacques Dordain, Director-General of the European Space Agency
Lifetime Achievement	Paul Money
Space Activity - Academic Study / Research	Rosetta Ptolemy Team
Space Activity - Industry	SSTL NigeriaSat 2 Team
Space Education - Outreach	Heather MacRae
Space Education - Student Achievement	Charlotte Lücking
Space Media	Space Boffins

== 2011 ==
The 2011 award took place at the UK Space Conference at the University of Warwick in July 2011.

Category	Recipient
Achievement in Space Education and Outrearch	Unlimited Theatre for 'Mission to Mars'
Achievement in Space Research	University of Strathclyde Advanced Space Concepts Lab
Achievement in Space Commerce	Clyde Space
Achievement in Space Media	Clive Horwood
Space Student Achievement	Chris Brunskill
International Space Achievement	David Thompson, Orbital Sciences Corporation
Exceptional Space Achievement	Professor David Southwood

== 2010 ==
The award dinner was held on 27 March 2010 at the UK Space Conference at Charterhouse.

Category	Recipient
International Award	International Space University
Inspiration Award	Anu Ojha
Team of the year	Qinetiq
Individual Achievement	Matt Griffin
Best Film/TV/Radio Presentation	James May on the Moon
Best Space Reporting	Jonathan Amos, BBC News Online
Education	Becky Parker
Entrepreneur	David Williams
Outreach	The EADS STEM Ambassadors
Student	Áron Kidsi
Special Award	Roy Gibson, first Director-General of the European Space Agency

== 2009 ==
The 2009 Awards dinner was held on 4 April 2009 at the UK Space conference.

Category	Recipient
Achievement in Education	Chris Welch, Kingston University
Best Corporate/Team Achievement	Automated Transfer Vehicle Team, John Ellwood: ATV project manager
Best Individual Achievement	Richard Garriott
Best Lifetime Achievement	Professor Fred Taylor
Best Space Reporting	BBC News Science Team, special citation for Paul Rincon
Best Student Achievement	Dr. David Boyce
Best TV/Radio Presentation	Dan Walker, producer and director of BBC Four's The Satellite Story
Best Written Presentation	Red Moon Rising, by Matthew Brzezinski
Inspiration Award	Lord Drayson
Outreach Award for the Public Promotion of Space	The UK IAC2008 Team
Special Award	Alistair Scott

== 2008 ==
The 2008 Awards dinner was held on 29 March 2008 at Charterhouse. Special guests were George Abbey and Joe Engle.

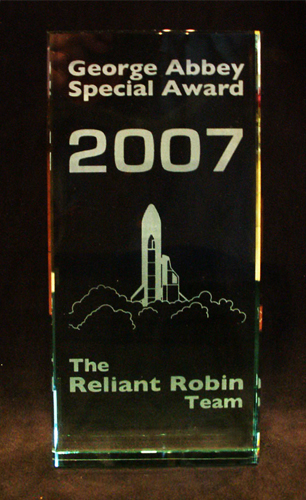
The glass version of the George Abbey Award

Category	Recipient
Best Corporate/Team Achievement	Mars Express Team; Project Manager Rudi Schmidt
Best Individual Achievement	Ian Taylor MP
Best Student Achievement	Alison Gibbings
Best Space Reporting	"Spaceflight" magazine; Editor Clive Simpson
Achievement in Education	Faulkes Telescope Project; director Paul Roche
Inspiration Award	Piers Sellers
Best Presentation, Film	In the Shadow of the Moon; Director David Sington & Christopher Riley
Best Presentation, TV & Radio	Martin Redfern and Heather Couper: "Britain's Space Race"
Best Presentation, Written	David A. Baker: Jane's Spaceflight Directory
Outreach Award for the Public Promotion of Space	Maggie Aderin-Pocock
Space Entrepreneur	Alan Bond
Lifetime Achievement	Sir Martin Sweeting, Executive Chairman of Surrey Satellite Technology Ltd
George Abbey Award	A glass version of the award presented to two members of the Rocket Men team in replacement for the paper versions given the previous year (see 2007 Awards below/picture (right)).

== 2007 ==
The 2007 Awards dinner was held on 14 April 2007 at the BROHP conference at Charterhouse.

Category	Recipient
Best Corporate/Team Achievement	The Mars Exploration Rovers Team
Best Individual Achievement	Steve Squyres
Best Space Reporting	Robin Scagell
Achievement in Education	The International Space School Educational Trust
Inspiration Award	Sir Patrick Moore
Best Presentation, TV & Radio	The Sky At Night
Best Presentation, Written	Charles S. Cockell: Space on Earth
Outreach Award for the Public Promotion of Space	Lord Sainsbury
Lifetime Achievement	Eric "Winkle" Brown
Special Award	Ray Bradbury
George Abbey award	The Rocket Men Team that made a Space Shuttle out of a Reliant Robin for the BBC TV series Top Gear

Among the other nominees were Anousheh Ansari, and the British-born astronaut Piers Sellers.

== 2006 ==
The 2006 Awards dinner was held on 8 April 2006 at the BROHP conference at Charterhouse.

Category	Recipient
Best Corporate/Team Achievement	The UK Huygens Industry Team
Best Individual Achievement	David Parker
Best Student Achievement	Sabrina Pottinger
Achievement in Education	Alex Blackwood
Inspiration Award	Michael Foale
Best Presentation, TV & Radio	Space Race
Best Presentation, Written	Alan Lawrie: Saturn
Outreach Award for the Public Promotion of Space	The PPARC Communication Team
Lifetime Achievement	Reginald Turnill

Among the other nominees were Sir Richard Branson, and the Robson Green drama television series Rocket Man.

== 2005 ==
Presented at the inaugural awards dinner at Charterhouse, Saturday 2 April 2005.

Category	Recipient
Best Corporate Achievement	EADS Space
Best Individual Achievement	John Zarnecki
Best Student Achievement	Julia Tizard
Best Space Reporting	David Whitehouse
Achievement in Education	National Space Centre
Inspiration Award	George Scoon
Best Presentation, TV & Radio	Christopher Riley, producer: Space Odyssey: Voyage To The Planets
Best Presentation, Written	David A. Hardy and Patrick Moore: Futures—50 Years in Space
Outreach Award for the Public Promotion of Space	Colin Pillinger
Special Award	British Interplanetary Society

Sir Arthur was also presented with a special award commemorating the 60th anniversary of his paper on global communication by satellite in the October 1945 edition of Wireless World. This award was accepted on behalf of Sir Arthur by his brother Fred.

== See also ==
- List of space technology awards
