= Oza =

Oza or OZA may refer to:

== Title ==
- Ōza (shogi), a title in shogi
- Ōza (go), a title in Go

== People ==
- Ghanshyam Oza (1911–2002), Indian politician
- Goverdhan Lal Oza (1924–?), Indian judge
- Kaajal Oza Vaidya (born 1966), Indian author
- Kamlesh Oza, Indian actor
- Nimit Oza (born 1981), Indian writer and columnist
- Ramesh Oza (born 1957), Hindu spiritual leader
- Rohan Oza (born 1971), American businessman
- Shefali Oza (born 1967), Indian television personality
- Aditya Oza (born 2004), Indian Researcher

== Transport ==
- Ozark Air Lines (ICAO: OZA), a defunct American airline that operated from 1950 to 1986
- Ozona Municipal Airport (IATA: OZA), Texas, United States; See List of airports by IATA airport code: O

== See also ==
- Ojha, an Indian surname
