= UK Centre for Astrobiology =

Astrobiology research organization at the University of Edinburgh

The UK Centre for Astrobiology was set up at the University of Edinburgh in 2011 by Charles Cockell. It was set up as a UK node, formally affiliated as an international partner with the NASA Astrobiology Institute (NAI) alongside other national nodes until the NAI's dissolution in 2019. It was established as a virtual centre to sit at the interdisciplinary boundary of planetary sciences/astronomy and biological/earth sciences investigating numerous aspects of life in the universe, specifically 'how habitable worlds form in the Universe and how life emerges, proliferates and leaves traces on these worlds' as well as engaging in work on the robotic and human exploration of space and in space ethics, philosophy and governance.

In the ten years from 2011 to 2021, the UKCA led or was affiliated with over 150 scientific papers in this period. Its published scientific work encompassed life in extremes, exoplanet biosignatures, biosignatures of life on Mars and early Earth, analogue research and other areas encompassing the habitability of planetary bodies. For example, the Centre oversaw the launch and implementation of the first biological mining experiment in space on the International Space Station in support of long-term human space settlement, demonstrating the use of microorganisms to mine economically important elements in space. The centre's members were involved in Mars analog missions, expeditions to numerous extreme environments, as well as space missions such as NASA's Curiosity rover mission. The centre was microbiology lead on the NASA BASALT project (Biologic Analog Science Associated with Lava Terrains) to develop NASA plans for the human exploration of Mars. It was scientific coordinator of the EU Framework 7 project MASE (Mars Analogues for Space Exploration) investigating microbial life in numerous Mars-like environments. It organised a number of conferences in this ten-year period, hosting UK and European-level astrobiology conferences.

The UKCA launched a number of scientific and technical initiatives. It set up the world's first underground astrobiology laboratory in the Boulby Underground Science Laboratory, running a program MINAR (MIne Analog Research) from 2013 which brought in international teams from NASA, ESA, India, and universities across the UK and internationally to study life in the deep subsurface and test planetary exploration equipment. In particular, MINAR focuses on the synergies between planetary exploration and mining, using the active mine environment to test technologies that create synergies between these two areas, such as rovers to carry out 3D mapping and gas detection for safety and structural assessments in mines and the exploration of other planets. The initiative hosted the NASA Spaceward Bound project and ESA astronaut training.

The centre also launched numerous education initiatives. For example, the Centre set up and hosted the astrobiology academy, an initiative to bring teachers together to develop curriculum and lesson plans that used astrobiology to teach science in schools. The initiative produced lesson plans that were used to launch astrobiology in Scottish primary and secondary schools in association with the Scottish government's RAISE programme (Raising Aspiration in Science Education). The material became part of the National Resource Guide and the National Education Portal. It has been used to teach astrobiology across India in collaboration with the A.P.J. Abdul Kalam Centre, reaching tens of thousands of students.

In 2016, the centre, in collaboration with the Scottish Prison Service, launched Life Beyond, which involved prisoners in the design of settlements beyond Earth. Scottish prisoners published two books on settlement designs for the Moon and Mars. This led to the development of a distance learning Life Beyond course, which can be undertaken by any prisoner around the world, distributed to English and Welsh prisons in collaboration with the Prisoners' Education Trust. Given the similarities between prisons and planetary stations (confinement, interdependence), the project tapped into prisoners' experience of confinement to imagine life beyond Earth, involving them in literacy, science, governance and civic responsibility. Life Beyond was cited by EuroPris as an example of best education practice in European prisons.

The centre led initiatives in considering space governance and space philosophy. For example, between 2013 and 2015 it led three international workshops to consider the future of forms of liberty beyond Earth, investigating the political philosophy of extraterrestrial settlement and in particular the effects of the extraterrestrial environment on forms of freedom. This led to three multi-author books published with Springer on the political philosophy of liberty beyond Earth.

The centre launched and led undergraduate and postgraduate astrobiology courses at the University of Edinburgh leading to a textbook published with Wiley-Blackwell on Astrobiology, which is in its second edition. It led and offered the world's first massive open on-line course (MOOC) in astrobiology in 2012 with Coursera, which attracted over 150,000 students.
