= Cockell =

Cockell is a surname. Notable people with the surname include:

- Charles S. Cockell (born 1967), British astrobiologist
- Don Cockell (1928–1983), English boxer
- Jenny Cockell (born 1953)
- Merrick Cockell (born 1957), British politician

== See also ==
- John Mills-Cockell (born 1943), Canadian composer
