= Ojha =

Ojha is a surname found across India. The term "Ojha" also refers to a Hindu Brahmin caste, found in Gujarat, Uttar Pradesh, Bihar, Madhya Pradesh and Nepal. In some contexts, "Ojha" can also refer to a shaman or traditional healer, particularly in traditional societies. Ojhas are considered to be worshipers of Durga, Saraswati, Hanuman, Mahalakshmi and Shiva. The surname is used amongst speakers of Nepali, Bhojpuri, Rajasthani, Gujarati, Hindi, Kumaoni as well as the Santhals. In India all ojha originate from Rajasthan.Ojha were also spiritual leader for uttar Pradesh and Bihar region. They perform as “Rajguru”, “Army Trainer”, “Thinker” and Philosopher. Most of the Ojha's are concentrated in the state of Rajasthan, Gujarat and Uttar Pradesh in India.

== Notable people with the surname ==
- Amritlal Ojha (1890–1944), Indian coal miner and businessman
- Anant Kumar Ojha, Indian politician
- Anu Ojha (born 1968), director of the United Kingdom National Space Centre, skydiving expert
- Gaurishankar Hirachand Ojha (1863–1947), historian from the Indian state of Rajasthan
- Har Narayan Ojha, birth name of Swami Karpatri, monk, founder of Akhil Bharatiya Ram Rajya Parishad and guru of current Shankaracharya of puri Swami Nishchalanand Saraswati
- Harshita Ojha, Indian actress in Ek Veer Ki Ardaas...Veera
- Jaya Ojha, Indian film, stage, and television actress and singer
- Krittibas Ojha, medieval poet, the first to translate the Ramayana in Bengali
- Lujendra Ojha, Nepali planetary scientist at NASA
- Nagendra Nath Ojha, Indian politician
- Gopal Dutt Ojha, Indian politician
- Nainakala Ojha, Nepalese politician
- Naman Ojha, Indian first-class cricketer
- Narayan Dutta Ojha (1926–?), judge and Governor of Madhya Pradesh
- Om Prasad Ojha, Nepalese politician
- Pragyan Ojha, former Indian cricketer
- Pushpa Raj Ojha (born 1959), Nepalese Olympic sprinter
- Puskar Nath Ojha, Nepalese politician
- Rajshree Ojha (born 1976), Indian film maker
- Ramesh Bhai Ojha, Hindu spiritual leader
- Sarbadev Ojha, Nepalese politician
- Shivakant Ojha, Indian politician
- S. K. Ojha (1921–1980), Indian film director
