= Project Boreas =

2003 BIS Northern Mars base study

Project Boreas was a study conducted between 2003 and 2006 by the British Interplanetary Society to design a station on the Planum Boreum at the Martian North Pole. The project was international, involving over 25 scientists and engineers, co-ordinated by Charles S. Cockell. Pole Station was designed to operate for three summers and two polar winters. Amongst a diversity of scientific objectives the station occupants were to retrieve a deep core from within the Martian polar ice caps and search for water and habitable conditions deep in the polar ice cap. Expeditions were planned to numerous locations across the Martian north polar caps, including the Chasma Boreale and the polar layered terrains. The study involved wide-ranging investigations of the scientific priorities for a human presence at the Martian polar ice caps through to detailed architectural and design studies for the station. Studies were undertaken on mobility and communications and psycho-social issues for long-term operation at the Martian polar station.

== Concept ==
Project Boreas was named for the Greek god of the North Wind. Concepts for polar bases had been discussed in earlier papers The station was designed with the assumption that it would be occupied by 10 people. Although the station could be constructed at any time, the study used a timeframe of 2037 to 2042 to provide a backdrop for the design. It is likely that in the coming decades robots will explore the Martian polar caps, which were first observed by Italian astronomer, Giovanni Cassini in 1666. Project Boreas considered long-term human polar exploration on Mars.

== Scientific and exploration objectives ==
The crew of the station were envisaged to carry out diverse scientific studies in geology, geophysics, climatology, and astrobiology. One particular advantage of humans was perceived to be their ability to run a laboratory in which complex and analytical tasks can be undertaken in polar science and exploration. The design study considered that the retrieval of a core into the polar ice cap would be one of the primary objectives of Pole Station. The core would be used to study past geological and climatological changes, including dating past Martian dust storms. The core would also be used to investigate the nature of the polar layered terrains. It would be used to study whether the ice caps contained a record of organics on Mars, to search for habitats in the ice and to study questions on the past and present habitability of Martian polar ices. The occupants also had diverse climatology objectives to undertake. The study considered Martian polar astronomy to be a potentially useful additional activity for the station crew members.

During the 1173 sol-stay on the Martian surface the crew would carry out a number of expeditions across the polar ice cap. Expeditions to the Chasma Boreale and along the polar spiral valleys were considered in detail. The study also considered the possibility of exploratory mid-winter expeditions across the polar ice cap. These expeditions would be supported by pressurised and unpressurised rovers. Trafficability issues of trans-polar expeditions were considered.

== The Station Design ==
The study carried out a trade off analysis of power, thermal control and other parameters to provide a basis for the architectural design. The station would be constructed from six linked modules of 3.5 m diameter with a smaller cache module. The modules included a galley area, science and human factors laboratories, EVA preparation area and personal quarters. The station would have a ‘garden’ area to provide some fresh food and for psychological relief. The station would be supported by nuclear power and a hybrid physico-chemical and biological life support system. Provision for in-situ resource use (ISRU) from the Martian polar regions was studied, particular emphasis being placed on the availability of water from the polar ices. The station would support a separate small drilling encampment nearby and would be surrounded by radiative panels which would sublime the 2 m of carbon dioxide snow estimated to fall at Pole Station during the winter, allowing for year-round operations.

== Other Considerations ==
Project Boreas considered the use of bioinspired robots to support Pole Station. ‘Arctic fox’, ‘Arctic hare’, ‘snow bunting’ (a flying robot) and ‘lemmings’ would support science and exploration objectives from Pole Station by enabling remotely controlled data collection at many spatial scales either from the rovers or from the station. The design study investigated communications for Pole Station and satellite requirements for sustaining base to field communications. The unique psycho-social issues associated with the long and permanently dark Martian polar winter were addressed. Medical requirements for long-term operation at the Martian polar ice caps were investigated in addition to the nutrition requirements, which were used to constrain the life support system design.

== Recognition ==
The Project Boreas report was shortlisted for the 2007 Sir Arthur Clarke Award in the category of "Best Written Presentation".
