= Vaissière =

Vaissière may refer to:

== People ==
- Étienne de la Vaissière, French scholar
- Jacqueline Vaissière, French phonetician
- Magali Vaissière, director at the European Space Agency

== Other ==
- Vaissière, a minor planet

== See also ==
- Vayssière
