= Charles S. Cockell =

British astrobiologist

Charles Cockell
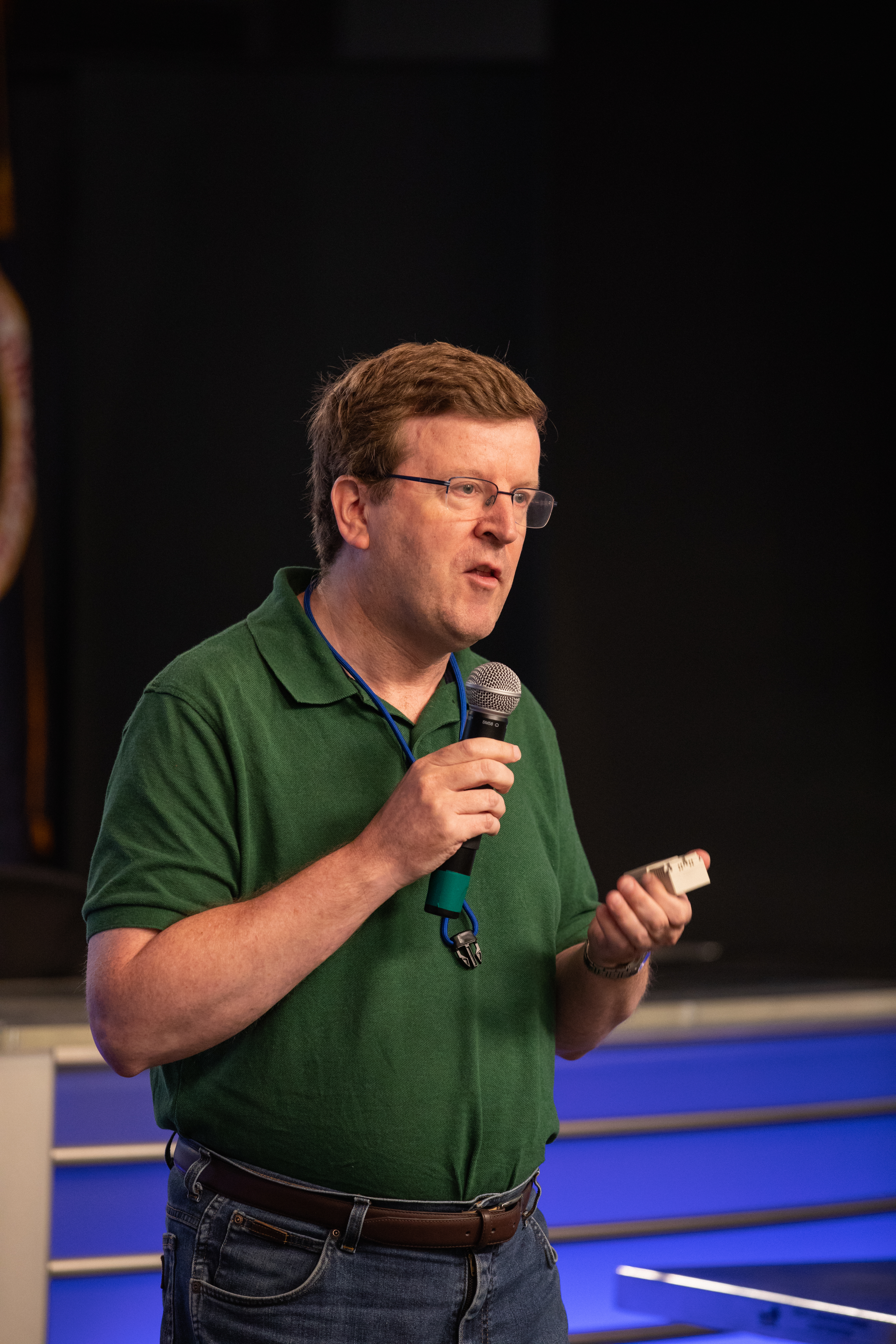
- Charles Cockell speaking at a briefing at NASA Kennedy Space Center in 2019.
- Born: 21 May 1967 (age 59)
- Education: University of Bristol; University of Oxford
- Known for: Co-director of the UK Centre for Astrobiology; work on life in extreme environments; Project Boreas
- Scientific career
- Fields: Astrobiology, geomicrobiology, microbiology
- Workplaces: University of Edinburgh School of Physics and Astronomy; Open University; British Antarctic Survey; NASA Ames Research Center
- Thesis: The effects of mutation on the properties of plasminogen and streptokinase (1994)

Charles Cockell (born 21 May 1967) is a British astrobiologist who is professor of astrobiology in the School of Physics and Astronomy at the University of Edinburgh and co-director of the UK Centre for Astrobiology.

== Education ==
Cockell received his undergraduate degree in biochemistry and molecular biology at the University of Bristol in 1989 and his D.Phil. in molecular biophysics, University of Oxford in 1994.

== Career ==
Cockell was a National Research Council (National Academy of Sciences) Associate at the NASA Ames Research Center at Moffett Field from 1995 to 1998 and then a visiting scholar at Stanford University. He then worked at a microbiologist at the British Antarctic Survey, Cambridge, UK from 1999 to 2005, before becoming Professor of Geomicrobiology with the Open University until 2011 and afterwards moving to the University of Edinburgh as Professor of Astrobiology. His scientific interests have focused on astrobiology, geomicrobiology and life in extreme environments. He has published many scientific papers and books in these areas.

Cockell has also published extensively on the exploration of space. For example, he led the design study Project Boreas, which planned and designed a research station for the Martian North Geographical Pole from 2003 to 2006. He was the first chair of the Astrobiology Society of Britain. He has sat on numerous ESA and NASA working groups and panels focused on robotic and human space exploration.

== UK Centre for Astrobiology ==
Cockell established the UK Centre for Astrobiology at the University of Edinburgh in 2011. It was set up as a UK node, formally affiliated as an international partner with the NASA Astrobiology Institute (NAI) alongside other national nodes until the NAI's dissolution in 2019.

In its first ten years, the UKCA launched and led a number of initiatives. It set up the world's first underground astrobiology laboratory in the Boulby Underground Science Laboratory, running a program MINAR (MIne Analog Research) which brought in international teams from NASA, ESA, India, and universities across the UK and internationally to study life in the deep subsurface and test planetary exploration equipment.

The UKCA led or was affiliated with over 150 scientific papers in this period. Its scientific interests sat at the interface of planetary sciences and biological sciences involving laboratory, field and space mission studies. For example, the Centre oversaw the launch and implementation of the first biological mining experiment in space on the International Space Station in support of long-term human space settlement demonstrating the use of microorganisms to mine economically important elements in space.

The centre also launched education initiatives. For example, the Centre hosted the astrobiology academy, an initiative to bring teachers together to develop curriculum that used astrobiology to teach science in schools. The initiative produced lesson plans that were used to launch astrobiology in Scottish primary and secondary schools in association with the Scottish government's RAISE programme (Raising Aspiration in Science Education). The material became part of the National Resource Guide and the National Education Portal. It has been used to teach astrobiology across India in collaboration with the A.P.J. Abdul Kalam Centre, reaching tens of thousands of students.

In 2016, the centre, in collaboration with the Scottish Prison Service, launched Life Beyond, which involved prisoners in the design of settlements beyond Earth. Scottish prisoners published two books on settlement designs for the Moon and Mars. This led to the development of a distance learning Life Beyond course, which can be undertaken by any prisoner around the world, and distributed to English and Welsh prisons in collaboration with the Prisoners' Education Trust. Life Beyond was cited by EuroPris as an example of best education practice in European prisons.

== Expeditions ==
Cockell has led or taken part in a number of expeditions. In 1993 Cockell piloted a modified microlight aircraft over the rainforests of Sumatra, Indonesia that he designed for catching moths over the canopy. The Barnes Wallis Moth Machine had lights for nighttime flying, UV lights to attract moths and a net for scooping moths from the rainforest canopy. The moth machine was flown during an expedition to the Kerinci-Seblat National Park which also collected plants and insects as part of a biodiversity study. The expedition had the patronage of RAF's No. 617 Squadron. During the expedition the moth machine clipped the top of a tree and crashed. Over 5,000 moths were caught which were sent to Germany for biodiversity assessments. In 1997 he was elected an International Fellow of The Explorers Club. Cockell has led or taken part in other scientific expeditions around the world, including over 20 scientific field expeditions to the Arctic and Antarctic, the Atacama Desert, the Namib Desert, Iceland and elsewhere.

== Extraterrestrial liberty ==
Alongside his work on astrobiology, Cockell has contributed to work exploring the social, political, and philosophical dynamics of long-term space settlement, in particular the relationship between space settlement and liberty. In 2022, he published "Interplanetary Liberty: Building Free Societies in the Cosmos", which is an examination of the problems for freedom beyond Earth and how to secure it. In 2015 and 2016, he edited three multi-author volumes on space liberty, dissent, and governance for Springer, as part of the Space and Society series. He also contributed multiple chapters to each of the three volumes.

== Earth and Space Foundation ==
Cockell is chair of the Earth and Space Foundation, a registered British charity (1043871) which awards grants to expeditions that successfully bridge the gap between environmentalism and the exploration and settlement of space by either using space technologies and ideas in environmental fieldwork or use environments on Earth to advance knowledge of other planets. He founded the organisation in 1994. Since its establishment the foundation has supported over 60 field projects around the world. Cockell proposed the inseparable links between environmentalism and space exploration in a book Space on Earth (Macmillan, 2006). The book was winner of the best written presentation in the Sir Arthur Clarke Award 2007.

== Political career ==
In 1992 Cockell stood as a parliamentary candidate in Huntingdon for the "Forward to Mars Party" against incumbent Prime Minister John Major. The party advocated the increased involvement of Britain in the exploration of Mars, the European Space Agency's human exploration programme and the construction of a station on Mars. The party received 91 votes in the election.

== Books ==
- The Institutions of Extraterrestrial Liberty (2023) (Editor) Oxford University Press ISBN 978 0192897985
- Taxi from Another Planet: Conversations with Drivers about Life in the Universe (2022) Harvard University Press ISBN 978-0674271838
- Interplanetary Liberty: Building Free Societies in the Cosmos (2022) Oxford University Press ISBN 978-0192866240
- Astrobiology: Understanding Life in the Universe. Second Edition (2020) Wiley Blackwell ISBN 978-1118913338
- Life Beyond 2: From Prison to the Moon (2020) British Interplanetary Society ISBN 979-8642193419
- MicroDracula: A Story of Cytoplasmic Horror at the Micron Scale (2020) Self-published ISBN 979-8681714170
- Bruntsfield Brook: An Adventure Romance Among Microbes (2020) Self-published ISBN 978-1708236779
- The Equations of Life: How Physics Shapes Evolution (2018) Basic Books/Atlantic Books ISBN 978-1541617599
- Life Beyond: From Prison to Mars (2018) British Interplanetary Society ISBN 978-1983289088
- Astrobiology: Understanding Life in the Universe. First Edition (2016) Wiley Blackwell ISBN 978-1118913338
- Dissent, Revolution and Liberty Beyond Earth (2016) (Editor) Springer ISBN 978-3319293493
- Human Governance Beyond Earth: Implications for Freedom (2015) (Editor) Springer ISBN 978-3319180632
- The Meaning of Liberty Beyond Earth (2015) (Editor) Springer ISBN 978-3319095660
- Extraterrestrial Liberty: An Enquiry into the Nature and Causes of Tyrannical Government Beyond the Earth (2013) Shoving Leopard ISBN 978-1905565221
- Introduction to the Earth-Life System (2008) (with Corfield R, Edwards N, Harris N) Cambridge University Press ISBN 978-0521729536
- Biological Effects Associated with Impact Events (2006) (with Koeberl C and Gilmour I) Springer ISBN 978-3540257356
- Project Boreas: A Station for the Martian Geographic North Pole (2006) British Interplanetary Society ISBN 978-0950659794
- Martian Expedition Planning (2003) (Editor) American Astronautical Association ISBN 978-0877035077
- Ecosystems, Evolution and Ultraviolet Radiation (2003) (with Blaustein AR) Springer ISBN 978-1441931818
- Space on Earth: Saving Our World by Seeking Others (2006) MacMillan ISBN 978-0230007529
- Impossible Extinction: Natural Catastrophes and the Supremacy of the Microbial World (2003) Cambridge University Press ISBN 978-0521817363
