= Clarke Award =

Clarke Award or Clark Award may refer to:

- Arthur C. Clarke Award, given yearly to a science fiction author for a novel published in the United Kingdom.
- Sir Arthur Clarke Award, given yearly in the United Kingdom for achievements related to outer space.
- The John Bates Clark Medal for academic contributions by an American economist under age 40.
