= Paul Money =

British astronomer

Paul L Money FRAS, FBIS, is an astronomer based in Horncastle, Lincolnshire, England. He is well known for his extensive talks and is the reviews editor of the BBC Sky at Night magazine. He broadcasts occasionally on BBC Radio Lincolnshire and Lincoln City Radio. He was awarded the 'Eric Zucker' award for 2002/2003 for contributions to Astronomy by the Federation of Astronomical Societies. In October 2012 he was also awarded the Sir Arthur Clarke Lifetime Achievement Award for 2012 by the British Rocketry Oral History Project for his active promotion of astronomy and space to the public. From 2004 until 2013 he was one of the three Astronomers on the Omega Holidays Northern Lights Flights and was also a solar eclipse astronomer for their 2006 Turkey solar eclipse Trip and their 2009 China solar eclipse trip. In 2008 he was the solar eclipse expert and part of the expedition team for Poseidon Arctic Voyages on board the Russian Nuclear powered Ice Breaker 'Yamal' for the 2 August 2008 solar eclipse, viewed from the Arctic ice near the Franz Joseph Lands Islands. He has published a night sky guide called Nightscenes since 2000 and more recently has become a novelist with a Ghost Mysteries series and several Sci Fi works in the pipeline.

== Publications ==
- He is the reviews editor for the BBC Sky at Night magazine
- He publishes a 40-page sky guide every year called "NightScenes" for amateur astronomers
- He has also written the books 'Nightscenes: Guide to Simple Astrophotography' and 'Nightscenes Companion'.
- He is now a novelist with 3 books published so far in the 'James Hansone Ghost Mysteries' series plus a Sci fi novel, 'Fragility of Existence' with others in progress.
