= Vayssière =

Vayssière is a French surname. Notable people with the surname include:

- Albert Jean Baptiste Marie Vayssière (1854–1942), French invertebrate zoologist
- Jean-Luc Vayssière (born 1956), French geneticist

== See also ==
- Vaissière (disambiguation)
