= John Zarnecki =

English space science professor

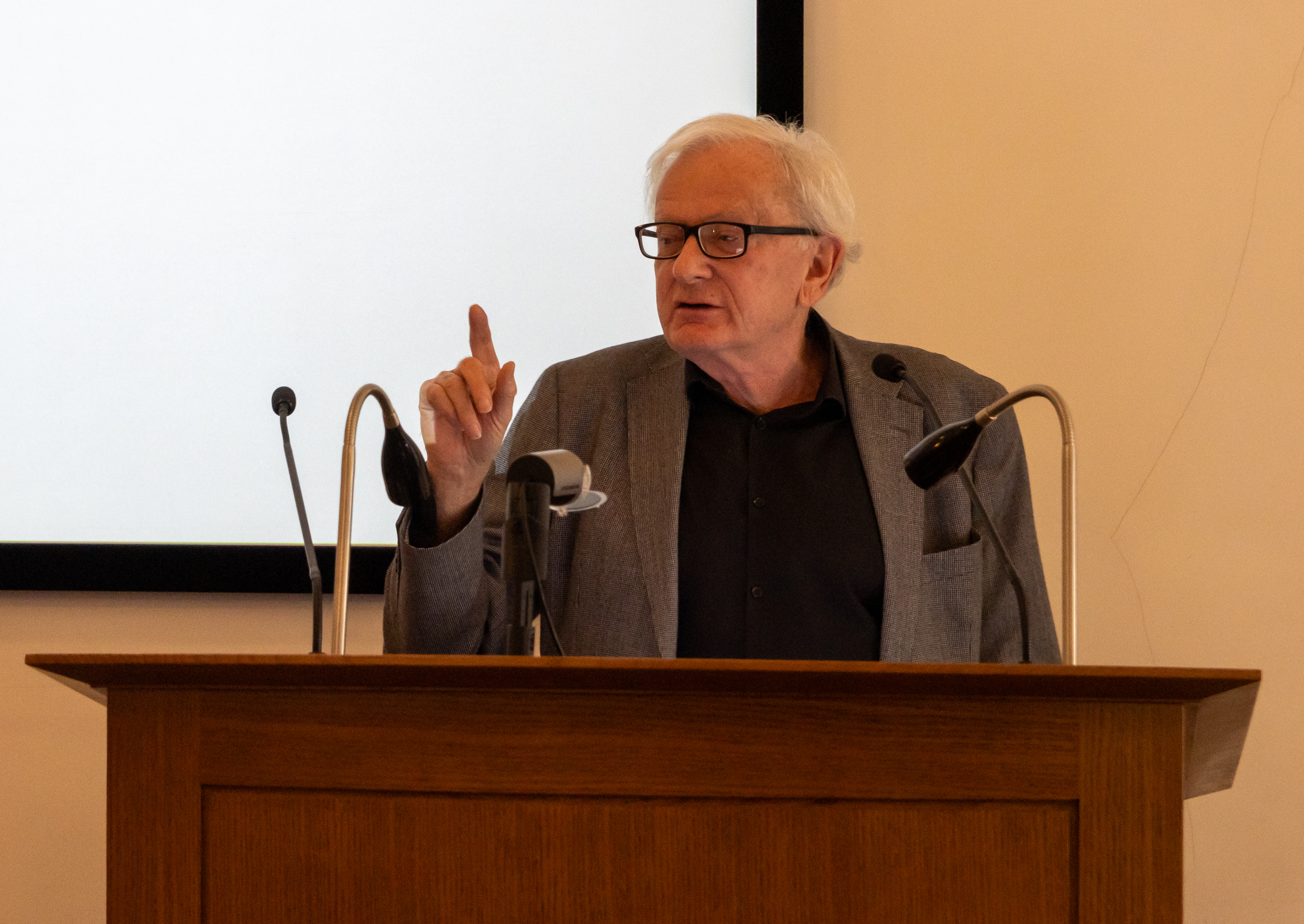
- John Zarnecki at the Royal Astronomical Society in 2025
- Born: 6 November 1949 (age 76); Finchley, Middlesex, England
- Education: Highgate School; Queens' College, Cambridge; University College London
- Occupations: Space science academic and researcher

Jan Charles "John" Zarnecki, FRAS FInstP (born 6 November 1949 in Finchley, Middlesex, England) is an English space science professor and researcher. Since 2013, Zarnecki has been a Director of the International Space Science Institute (Berne, Switzerland). Between 2004 and 2013 he was a Professor of Space Science (now Emeritus) at the Open University, having previously been a professor and researcher at the University of Kent.

Zarnecki has taken part in several high-profile space probe missions and is an expert on space debris, space dust and impacts. He was awarded the Gold Medal of the Royal Astronomical Society in 2014, and became President of the Royal Astronomical Society in May 2016, having been vice-president from 2009 to 2011 and President-Elect for the year from May 2015.

== Early life ==
Born and raised in Finchley, Middlesex, the son of the art historian George Zarnecki, he was educated at Highgate School in north London and was interested in space exploration from an early age. In 1961, the school gave its pupils a day off to witness the first person in space, Yuri Gagarin, visiting the tomb of Karl Marx in Highgate Cemetery nearby. Zarnecki was among those who went.

Zarnecki graduated with a BA degree in Natural Sciences from Queens' College, Cambridge in 1971 (promoted to MA in 1975). He undertook doctoral research at the Mullard Space Science Laboratory in Surrey and subsequently obtained a PhD degree in Physics and Astronomy from University College London in 1977.

== Space science ==
In the course of his career, Zarnecki has worked on hardware for many space missions. At first, he worked for British Aerospace and was part of the team that developed the Faint Object Camera for the Hubble Space Telescope. In 1981, he moved to the University of Kent in Canterbury and became the project manager for the Dust Impact Detection System on board the Giotto probe that visited Halley's Comet.

In 1988, Zarnecki was involved in plans to provide instrumentation for a proposed asteroid mission called Vesta, but, when this was dropped in favour of the Cassini–Huygens mission to Saturn and its moons, he and his team decided to use their expertise to design the Surface Science Package (SSP) for the Huygens probe. The probe would be released from the main spacecraft (Cassini) and descend to the surface of Saturn's largest moon Titan. The proposal was successful and, in 1990, Zarnecki was appointed as the SSP's Principal Investigator.

The next seven years were spent assembling and testing the instrument. With only 70% of necessary funds available, Zarnecki had to be creative with the resources he was assigned. He managed to persuade a group of scientists in Poland to provide part of the instrumentation for free.

One major setback came during the final stages of testing when, on 14 January 1996, the package was put through its final vibration test and its casing cracked. After some extensive redesign, the package was delivered to the European Space Agency (ESA). On 15 October 1997, Cassini-Huygens was successfully launched from Cape Canaveral.

In 2000, Zarnecki, along with the rest of the SSP team, moved to the Open University in Milton Keynes. There he became involved in the ill-fated Beagle 2 mission to Mars, lost while landing in December 2003.

On 25 December 2004, the Huygens probe separated successfully from Cassini and twenty-two days later, on 14 January 2005, it landed successfully on the surface of Titan. The SSP collected over three and a half hours of data, which, thanks to its efficient encoding, could be stored on a single floppy disk. The BBC Four television documentary Destination Titan, first broadcast in April 2011, focused on Zarnecki and the Huygens mission from the perspective of the mission scientists.

Between 2007 and 2009, Zarnecki was the Directory of the Centre for Earth, Planetary, Space & Astronomical Research (CEPSAR) at the Open University. He is currently working as the team leader on the ExoMars mission, Europe's first Mars rover mission. He is also co-investigator on the PTOLEMY instrument for the Rosetta mission to comet 67P/Churyumov-Gerasimenko.

== Honours and appointments ==
In 2005, Zarnecki won the Sir Arthur Clarke Award for individual achievement, for his work on the Huygens probe.

The International Academy of Astronautics (IAA) 2006 Laurels for Team Achievement was awarded to the Cassini-Huygens team.

In 2006, Asteroid 17920 was named Zarnecki by the International Astronomical Union, in recognition of “..spacecraft instrumentation to study the surfaces and atmospheres of planets, satellites and small bodies".

He and his group won the NASA Group Achievement Award for the "Huygens Surface Science Package" in 2007.

He was awarded the Gold Medal of the Royal Astronomical Society in 2014.

In September 2014 Zarnecki was appointed a Foreign Member of the Polish Academy of Arts and Sciences for his significant contribution to Polish science.

In 2016, he was appointed a Fellow of the Royal Astronomical Society (FRAS). Besides that, he is a Fellow of the Institute of Physics (FInstP), a Chartered Physicist (CPhys) and Member of the International Astronomical Union.

== Personal ==
Zarnecki lives in Milton Keynes and has a house in the south of France. He is a passionate supporter of Crystal Palace Football Club.
