= Director General of the European Space Agency =

Head of the international space agency

Director general of the European Space Agency

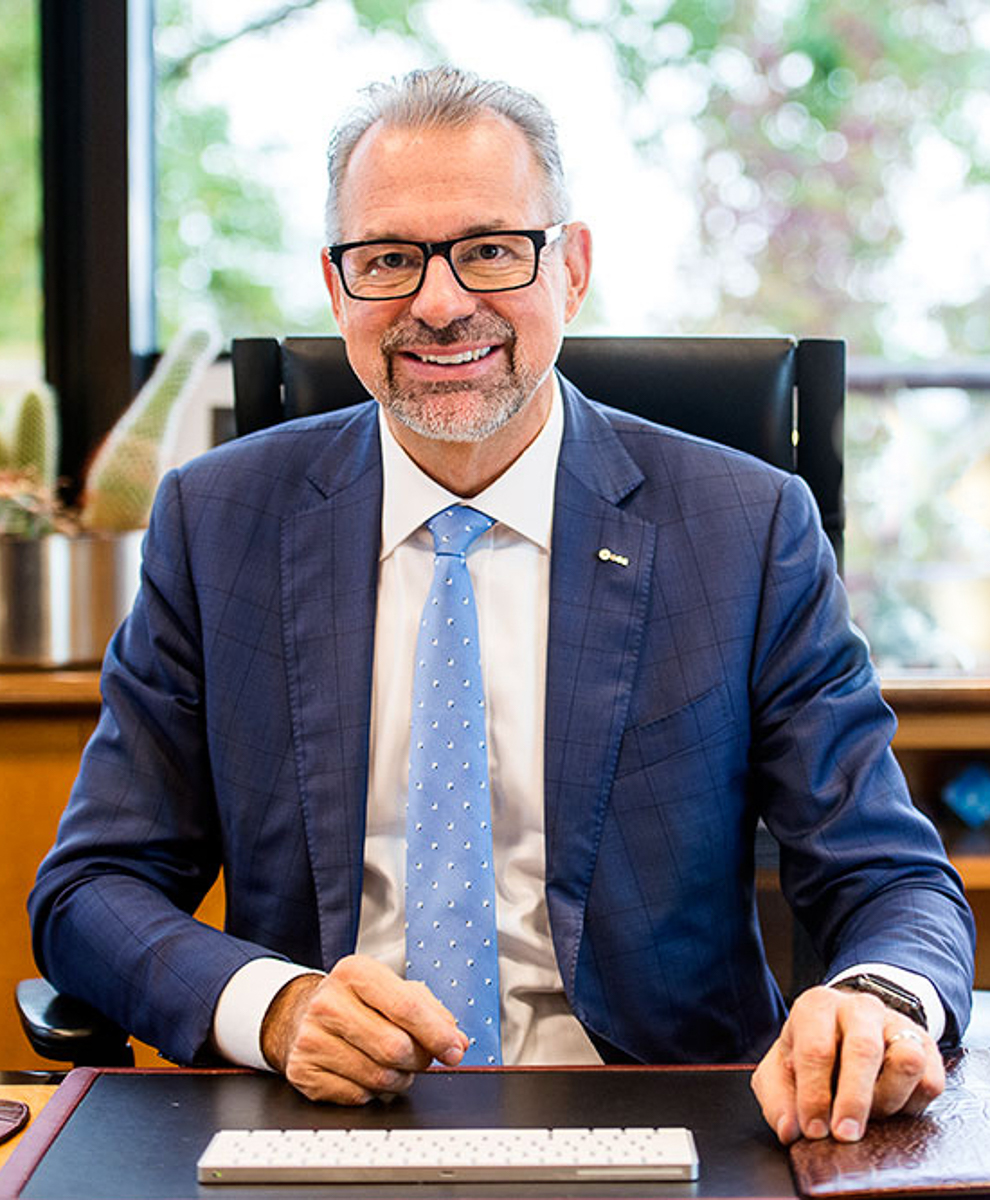
- Incumbent; Josef Aschbacher since 2021
- Term length: At the pleasure of the European Space Agency Council
- Inaugural holder: Roy Gibson
- Formation: 30 May 1975; 51 years ago

The director general of the European Space Agency is the highest-ranked official of the European Space Agency (ESA), a space agency formed by the collaboration of prominent European nations.

== List of officeholders ==
Image	Name	Country	Term start	Term end	Term length	Ref(s)
	Roy Gibson	United Kingdom	30 May 1975	1980	5 years	
	Erik Quistgaard	Denmark	1980	1984	4 years	
	Reimar Lüst	West Germany	1984	1990	6 years	
	Jean-Marie Luton	France	1990	1997	7 years	
	Antonio Rodotà	Italy	1997	2003	6 years	
	Jean-Jacques Dordain	France	July 2003	30 June 2015	12 years	
	Johann-Dietrich Wörner	Germany	1 July 2015	February 2021	6 years	
	Josef Aschbacher	Austria	1 March 2021	Incumbent	5 years	

== See also ==
- Similar positions worldwide
  - Canada: President of the Canadian Space Agency
  - India: Chairman of ISRO
  - Russia: General Director of Roscosmos
  - United States: Administrator of NASA
