= George Abbey (NASA) =

American NASA official (1932–2024)

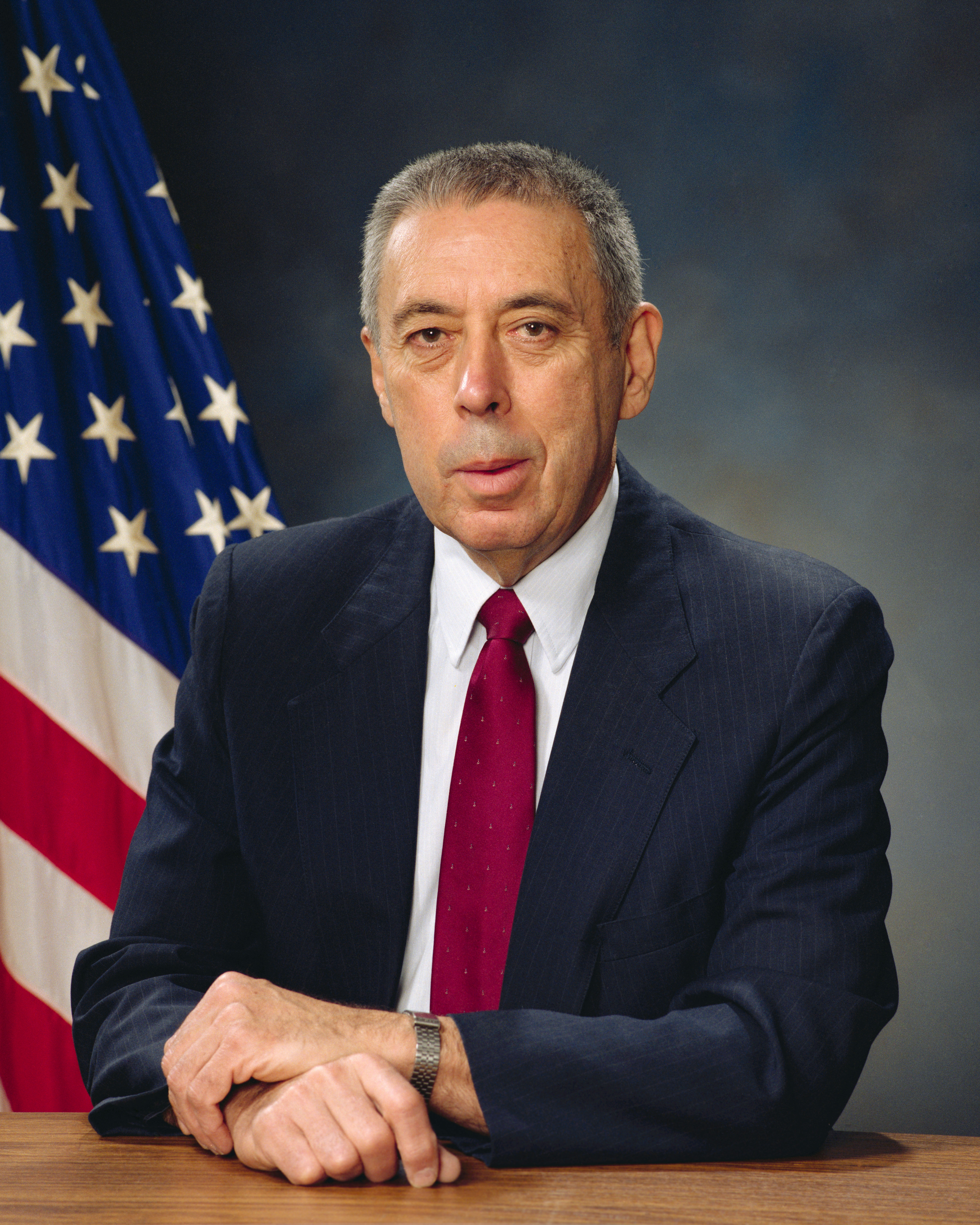
- Born: August 21, 1932; Seattle, Washington, U.S.
- Died: March 24, 2024 (aged 91); Houston, Texas, U.S.
- Occupations: NASA Official; United States Air Force pilot
- Known for: Director of the Johnson Space Center
- Spouse: Joyce Widerman (m. 1955; div. 1980)
- Children: 5

George William Samuel Abbey (August 21, 1932 – March 24, 2024) was an American NASA official and United States Air Force pilot. A Naval Academy graduate he graduated from the Air Force Institute of Technology as an electrical engineer, then served in the United States Air Force and the Apollo program. He subsequently became director of flight crews for the Space Shuttle, then director of the Johnson Space Center. Honors include the NASA Exceptional Service Medal, the NASA Outstanding Leadership Medal, three NASA Distinguished Service Medals and the 1970 Presidential Medal of Freedom.

== Early life and education ==
George Abbey was born in Seattle, Washington, on August 21, 1932, the fourth child of Sam and Brenta Abbey. His father was born in London, emigrated to Canada, then served in World War I and World War II. Settling briefly in Laugharne, Wales, the couple moved to Canada, then settled in Seattle.

Although his father was an agnostic, Abbey was raised in his mother's Presbyterian faith and frequently attended Lutheran church services during his high school years to be with his Scandinavian friends. Abbey attended Lincoln High School in Seattle and graduated in 1950. After he graduated, he joined Naval Reserve Officers' Training Corps (NROTC) at the University of Washington. At the behest of his brother Vince, George applied for United States Naval Academy in Annapolis, Maryland. He received his bachelor's degree in general science there in 1954; and a master's degree in electrical engineering from the U.S. Air Force Institute of Technology at Wright-Patterson Air Force Base, Ohio, in 1959.

== U.S. Air Force and Apollo program ==
A pilot in the U.S. Air Force, Abbey had more than 4,000 hours in various types of aircraft before being detailed to NASA. While in the Air Force, he served in the Air Force Research and Development Command and was involved in the early Air Force crewed space activities, including the Dyna-Soar Program. Abbey joined NASA in 1964 as an Air Force captain assigned to the Apollo program. In December 1967 he left the Air Force and was named technical assistant to the Johnson Space Center director. In January 1976, he was named director of flight crew operations, where he was responsible for operational planning and for the overall direction and management of flight crew and flight control activities for all human spaceflight missions.

== Space Shuttle ==
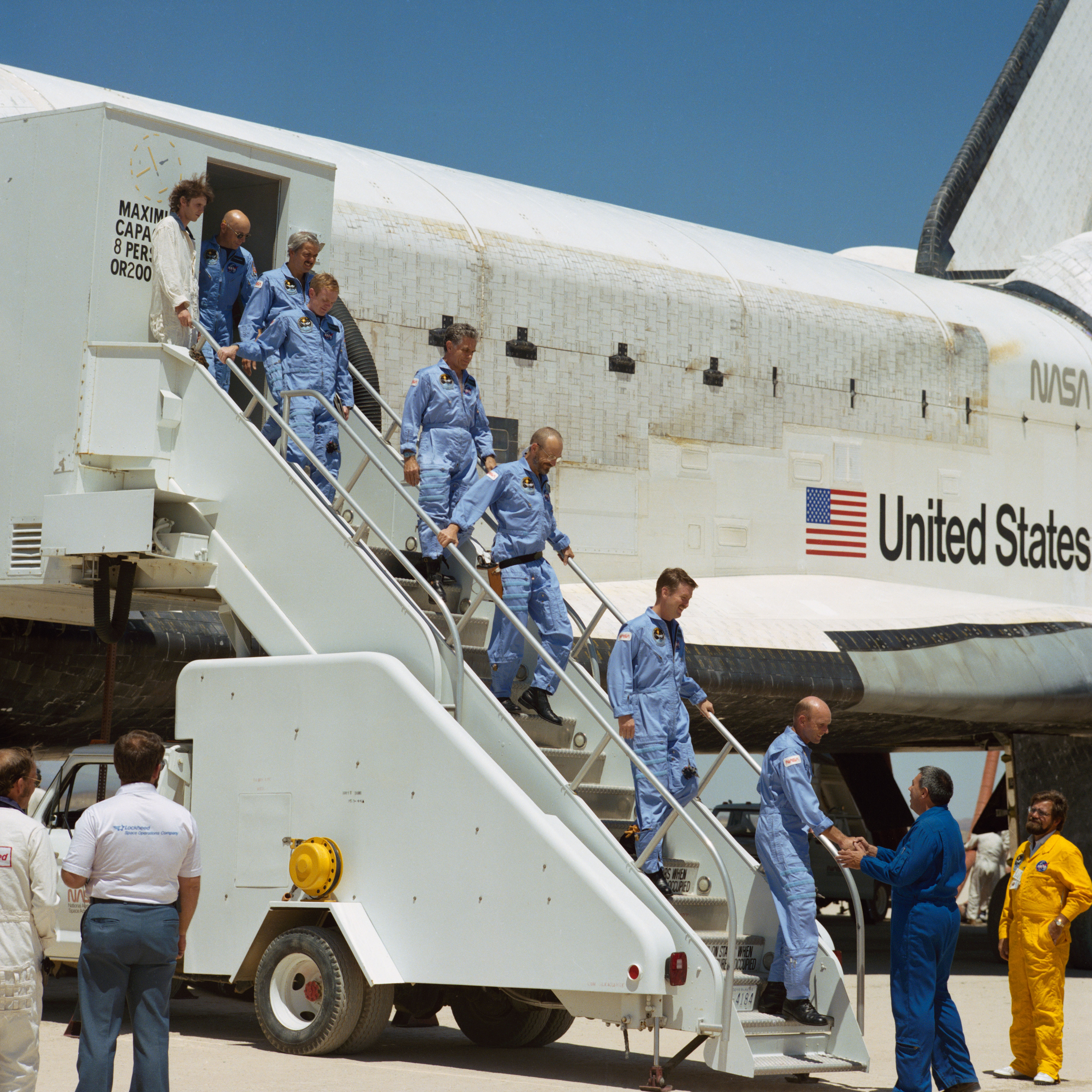
Abbey shaking hands with Astronaut C. Gordon Fullerton, as the crew of STS-51-F disembark the Space Shuttle Challenger.

In 1983, he became director of the Flight Crew Operations Directorate, where he continued to be responsible for all Space Shuttle flight crews and JSC aircraft operations. Abbey would select the crews that flew during the early years of the Space Shuttle. As director of flight operations, he put America's first woman in space when he assigned Sally Ride to the crew of 1983's STS-7.

Abbey was appointed deputy associate administrator for space flight at NASA Headquarters in Washington, D.C., in March 1988. In July 1990, he was selected as deputy for operations and senior NASA representative to the Synthesis Group, charged with defining strategies for returning to the Moon and landing on Mars.

In 1991, Abbey became senior director for civil space policy for the National Space Council, which soon altered the direction for America's space initiatives and began investigating unique opportunities for engaging the former Soviet Union to collaborate in the space program.

== Johnson Space Center director ==
In 1992, he was named special assistant to the NASA administrator. In 1994 Abbey was named deputy director of the Johnson Space Center and was subsequently selected as the JSC director in 1996.

As director of Johnson Space Center until 2001, he served as an integral part of the NASA Shuttle-Mir Program and provided crucial oversight, management, and guidance in the first phase of the International Space Station.

Abbey was opposed to the proposed Space Station Freedom because of the large cost and impracticality of the station. A small team of administrators and scientists including Abbey, John Young, Thomas P. Stafford and Max Faget were called to devise a cheaper alternative to Freedom. This team proposed a new modular space station in April 1993. He helped later enlist partner nations to share the adventure—and the costs—of implementing those plans for a permanent outpost in Earth orbit.

== Personal life ==
Abbey was married to Joyce Widerman, and had five children.

Following an illness, Abbey died in Houston, on March 24, 2024, at the age of 91.

== Honors ==
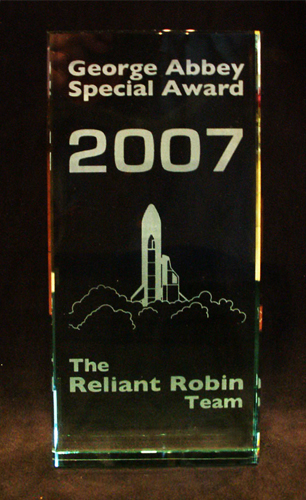
2007 George Abbey Special Award

In 2002, Abbey was selected as a distinguished alumnus of the U.S. Air Force Institute of Technology.

His honors and awards include the NASA Exceptional Service Medal, the NASA Outstanding Leadership Medal, three NASA Distinguished Service Medals and the 1970 Presidential Medal of Freedom, presented by President Richard M. Nixon for his distinguished civilian service in peacetime.

Abbey was a senior fellow in space policy at the James A. Baker III Institute for Public Policy of Rice University from 2002 until his death.

He was the recipient of the Rotary National Award for Space Achievement's National Space Trophy in 1997.

In 1998, he was awarded the Robert R. Gilruth Award in recognition of his accomplishments and dedication to human spaceflight.

In 2007, Abbey presented a special award named after him as part of the Sir Arthur Clarke Awards.

In December 2021, the Johnson Space Center rocket park was renamed the George W.S. Abbey Rocket Park in Abbey's honor.

== Selected publications ==
- Abbey, George (September 13, 2013). "The U.S.–Russia Space Experience: A Special and Unique Partnership" (PDF). James A. Baker III Institute for Public Policy.
- Abbey, George (October 26, 2011). "Return to Reality: Why a Space Shuttle Program Is Vital to the Survival of the International Space Station". James A. Baker III Institute for Public Policy.
- Abbey, George (July 20, 2011). "Restore the Vision" (PDF). James A. Baker III Institute for Public Policy.
- Abbey, George; Lane, Neal (2009). United States Space Policy: Challenges and Opportunities Gone Astray (PDF). American Academy of Arts and Sciences. ISBN 978-0-87724-081-5.
- Abbey, George; Lane, Neal (June 30, 2009). "Congressional Briefing for United States Space Policy: Challenges and Opportunities Gone Astray" (PDF). James A. Baker III Institute for Public Policy.
- Abbey, George; Lane, Neal; Muratore, John (January 20, 2009). "Maximizing NASA's Potential in Flight and on the Ground: Recommendations for the Next Administration" (PDF). James A. Baker III Institute for Public Policy.
- Abbey, George; Lane, Neal (December 5, 2007). "Video Briefing Transcript: Public Policy for the Public – Science and Technology" (PDF). James A. Baker III Institute for Public Policy.
- Abbey, George; Lane, Neal (November 2, 2007). "Nuclear Nonproliferation: Policy Implications". James A. Baker III Institute for Public Policy.
- Abbey, George; Lane, Neal (August 31, 2005). United States Space Policy: Challenges and Opportunities (PDF). American Academy of Arts and Sciences. ISBN 0-87724-049-3.

== Sources ==
- Bagby, Meredith (2023). The New Guys: The Historic Class of Astronauts that Broke Barriers and Changed the face of Space Travel. New York: HarperCollins. ISBN 978-0-06-314197-1. OCLC 1369174609.
- Cassutt, Michael (2018). The Astronaut Maker: How One Mysterious Engineer Ran Human Spaceflight for a Generation. Chicago: Chicago Review Press. ISBN 978-1-61373-700-2. OCLC 1019840642.
