= Reginald Turnill =

BBC space correspondent

- Born: 12 May 1915; Dover, Kent, England
- Died: 12 February 2013 (aged 97) near Ashford, Kent, England
- Occupations: Aviation and space correspondent for the BBC
- Notable credit(s): BBC TV News, BBC World Service, BBC Radio 4
- Spouse: Margaret Hennings
- Children: 2 sons

Reginald George Turnill (12 May 1915 – 12 February 2013) was the BBC's aviation (and space) correspondent for twenty years during the beginnings of crewed space exploration and the early jet age in aviation, including the breakthrough in supersonic passenger flight represented by Concorde. He covered NASA's space missions and all the Apollo program Moon missions for the BBC. Turnill's connection with the BBC, as a freelance, continued for some years after his official retirement.

== Career ==
Reginald Turnill began his career at the age of 15 as a reporter's telephonist at the Press Association, the British news agency, becoming a reporter by 1935. After war service as a machine gunner in the Middlesex Regiment, and as a warrant officer reporting courts martial for the Judge Advocate General's department in Naples, he returned to the Press Association in 1946, where he remained until his recruitment by the BBC in 1956 as assistant industrial correspondent.

In 1958 he became the corporation's Air and Space Correspondent, with a brief to include defence as well. He was not a War correspondent; he concentrated on technology. He became friendly with Wernher von Braun, who was only three years older, although his approach was initially frosty and reticent. He covered all the crewed spaceflights as well as the introduction of passenger jets from the Comet IV to Concorde.

On 2 March 1969 he was the BBC's reporter on Concorde's maiden flight at Toulouse-Blagnac Airport.

In April 1970, he was the first journalist to report on the Apollo 13 catastrophe via the BBC World Service when based at the Lyndon B. Johnson Space Center on 13 April 1970.

After retiring from the BBC staff on his 60th birthday he continued working as a freelance broadcaster, writing many books and continuing as Newsround's Space Editor until the mid-1980s. In 1990 he presented Return Ticket, a five-part Radio 4 series about the Apollo 13 mission.

In 2006 he won the Sir Arthur Clarke Award Lifetime Achievement Award.

== Writer ==
He contributed to books, including the Observer's Book Book of Manned Spaceflight and the Observer's Book of Unmanned Spaceflight in the 1970s, published by Frederick Warne & Co. In the 1980s he edited Jane's Spaceflight Directory. He was disappointed by the cancellation of the Black Arrow British space programme in July 1971, at the moment that it was providing results. In 2003 he published The Moonlandings, An eyewitness account, in which he recounted how and why the first men landed on the moon.

Turnill wrote obituaries of people involved in aerospace and other figures for The Guardian, The Times and The Daily Telegraph, the last to appear during his lifetime being of James Arnot Hamilton, who helped design Concorde's wing. It appeared in The Guardian in May 2012.

== Personal life ==
He married Margaret Hennings in 1938 in Westminster. They had two sons. He lived in Sandgate, Kent.

Following a few months of poor health, Turnill died aged 97 at the Pilgrim's Hospice in Ashford, Kent, on 12 February 2013.

== Publications ==
- The Moonlandings: An Eyewitness Account (foreword by Buzz Aldrin), 2002, Cambridge University Press, ISBN 0-521-81595-9
- Celebrating Concorde, 1994, Ian Allan Publishing, ISBN 0-7110-2296-8
- Farnborough: the Story of the RAE (with Arthur Reed), 1981, Hale Publishing, ISBN 0-7091-8584-7
- The Language of Space: A Dictionary of Astronautics, 1970, Littlehampton Book Services, ISBN 0-304-93657-X
- Moonslaught: The full story of Man's race to the Moon, 1969, Purnell and Sons
- Jane's Spaceflight Directory (edited by Reginald Turnill), various editions during the 1980s,
- Astronautics, 1970, Littlehampton Book Services, ISBN 030493657X
- Observer's Book of Manned Spaceflight, 1972, Frederick Warne & Co. Ltd, ASIN B0055OFWQ8
- Observer's Book of Unmanned Spaceflight, 1974, Frederick Warne & Co. Ltd, ISBN 0723215227, ISBN 978-0723215226

== See also ==
- Jay Barbree
