= Josef Aschbacher =

Austrian space administrator

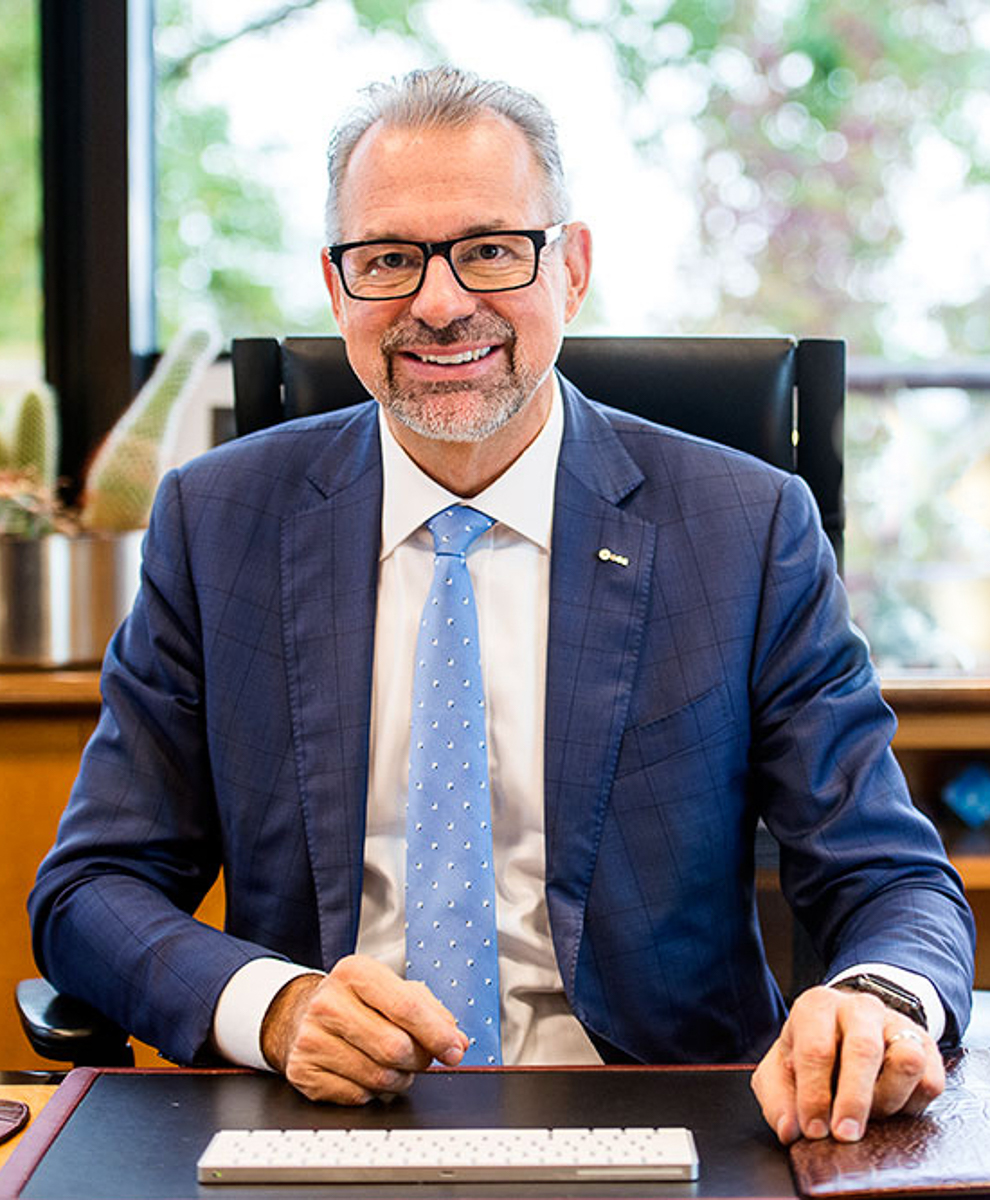
- Aschbacher in 2020

Director General of the European Space Agency
- Incumbent
- Assumed office 1 March 2021
- Preceded by: Johann-Dietrich Wörner

Personal details
- Born: 7 July 1962 (age 63) Ellmau, Austria
- Education: University of Innsbruck (MSc, PhD)

Josef Aschbacher is Director General of the European Space Agency (ESA), a position he has held since 1 March 2021. His international career in space combines more than 35 years' of experience at ESA, the European Commission, the Austrian Space Agency, the Asian Institute of Technology and the University of Innsbruck.

== Early life and education ==
Born in Ellmau, Austria, Aschbacher studied at the University of Innsbruck, graduating with a Master's degree and a PhD in natural sciences. He started his career by becoming a research scientist at the university's Institute of Meteorology and Geophysics, a post he held from 1985 to 1989.

== Initial career ==
Aschbacher first joined ESA as a young graduate trainee in 1990, based at the ESA Centre for Earth Observation in Frascati, Italy.

Between 1991 and 1993, he was seconded as a representative of ESA and of the Austrian Space Agency to Southeast Asia. He became an assistant professor at the Asian Institute of Technology in Bangkok, Thailand, and he initiated Earth observation cooperation programmes between ESA, the European Commission and Southeast Asia.

From 1994 to 2001, he served at the European Commission's Joint Research Centre in Ispra, Italy, becoming Scientific Assistant to the Director of the Space Applications Institute, where he was responsible for scientific strategy and resource allocation.

Aschbacher returned to ESA in 2001 to work as programme coordinator for the European Earth observation programme, the Copernicus Programme. In 2006, he was appointed Head of the Copernicus Space Office and he was then promoted to become Head of Programme Planning and Coordination within ESA's Directorate of Earth Observation Programmes. Between 2016 and 2021, he served as ESA's Director of Earth Observation Programmes and head of ESA's Centre for Earth Observation.

== Director General of ESA ==
Aschbacher became Director General of ESA on 1 March 2021. Based at ESA's headquarters in Paris, he is responsible for the definition, implementation and development of Europe's space infrastructure and activities, which include launchers, satellites performing Earth observation, navigation, telecommunication, space safety and space science, together with robotic exploration and ESA astronauts working on the International Space Station. ESA has an annual budget of €7 billion and a workforce of 5500 people distributed across several establishments, mostly in Europe.

On taking office, Aschbacher presented "Agenda 2025" – his plan to ensure that Europe has a world-class space agency. Agenda 2025 listed five immediate interrelated priorities: to strengthen ESA-EU relations; to promote the commercialisation of space and the strength of the European space industry; to ensure that space serves European security needs; to foster crucial technologies and capabilities to make progress in European space transportation and space exploration; and to transform ESA to ensure it is dynamic and responsive to future challenges. It also set out a longer-term vision to accelerate the use of space to meet the needs of European citizens in three areas: space for a green future; a space-enabled rapid and resilient crisis response; and the protection of space assets.

In June 2021, Aschbacher strengthened the relationship between ESA and the EU by signing a new Financial Framework Partnership Agreement worth almost €9 billion between 2021 and 2027.

Aschbacher oversaw the launch of the James Webb Space Telescope on board an Ariane 5 in December 2021. The telescope, which is a cooperation project between NASA, ESA and the Canadian Space Agency, is designed to answer outstanding questions about the Universe and to make breakthrough discoveries in all fields of astronomy. Because its launch was so accurate, the spacecraft has enough fuel left to maintain its position in space for potentially 20 years, which is twice as long as its designed operational lifetime.

Following the Russian invasion of Ukraine in February 2022, Aschbacher was forced to accept the unilateral suspension by the Roscomos administration of all Soyuz launches for European spacecraft and astronauts and the termination of the ESA-Russia collaboration in the ExoMars mission.

In November 2022, political representatives of ESA's member states, associate states and cooperating states met in Paris and endorsed Aschbacher's proposal to strengthen Europe's space ambitions. Simultaneously, Aschbacher announced the 2022 ESA astronaut group.

Aschbacher acknowledged ESA's failure for a European autonomous access to space in January 2023, following the retirement of the heavy-lift Ariane 5, the failure of the mid-sized Vega C rocket on its second flight and delays to the introduction of Ariane 6. He oversaw the temporary use of SpaceX launchers for European spacecraft and astronauts, while arguing that ESA needs to procure European commercial launch services, as its counterpart NASA has done with SpaceX.

To create a European system for secure connectivity, in September 2023 Aschbacher signed an agreement between ESA and the European Commission to develop a constellation of satellites – supported by information-relaying infrastructure on the ground – called IRIS² that will be used by European governments and businesses to keep information secure and confidential.

In November 2023, political representatives of ESA's member states, associate states and cooperating states met at a Space Summit in Seville. They endorsed Aschbacher's proposal to harness space for a greener future, take decisive steps in exploration, and ensure autonomous access to space while preparing a paradigm shift towards a more competitive next generation of launchers.

Also in 2023, Aschbacher mandate as Director General was extended for a further period of four years from 1 March 2025 to 2029.

Aschbacher has subsequently tried to secure Ariane 6 and Vega C by subsidizing a fixed number of launches each year. He called for a competition revolutionizing the future procurement of Europe's next generation of launchers with the aim of spurring competition and innovation. Aschbacher further announced a competition between companies based in Europe to develop a space cargo return service that will deliver supplies to the International Space Station by 2028 and return cargo to Earth. The service vehicle could evolve to a crew vehicle and eventually serve other destinations.

At the Space Summit, Aschbacher invited public organisations and commercial space companies to register their intention to sign a Zero Debris Charter with the aim of keeping space sustainable and free from space debris.

Aschbacher also strengthened relations between ESA and the EU by forming an agreement to work together on climate change with the European Commission's Directorate-General for Climate Action.

== Honours ==
Aschbacher is an honorary member of the European Academy of Science and Arts.

In 2021, Aschbacher became "Grande Ufficiale Ordine al Merito della Repubblica Italiana", the highest recognition accorded to non-Italian nationals.

In 2022, he was awarded the Ehrenzeichens des Landes Tirol, the Medal of Honour of the State of Tyrol, Austria.

In 2025, he was awarded the Ehrenzeichen für Verdienste um die Republik Österreich by the government of Austria.
