= Megaroc =

British 1940s proposed V2 derivative rocket

- Function: Human-rated sub-orbital launch vehicle
- Country of origin: United Kingdom

Size
- Height: 57 ft (17.5 m)
- Diameter: 7 ft 2 in (2.18 m)
- Mass: 46,700 lb (21,200 kg)
- Stages: 1

Capacity

Payload to sub-orbital trajectory
- Mass: 1,292 lb (586 kg)

Launch history
- Status: Cancelled
- Total launches: 0
- Carries passengers or cargo: BIS Capsule

Single stage
- Powered by: 1
- Maximum thrust: 59,600 lbf (265.0 kN)
- Specific impulse: 203 s (1.99 km/s)
- Burn time: 148.5 s
- Propellant: LOX/ethyl alcohol

Megaroc was a British crewed suborbital derivative of the V-2. It was proposed by the British Interplanetary Society (BIS).

It was designed during 1946 using information obtained under Operation Backfire that proved several advanced features in terms of guidance and propulsion now existed. R. A. Smith produced the proposal, under which the V-2 would have been extensively redesigned to convey a man-carrying capsule to an altitude of up to roughly 300 km (190 mi) above the Earth, although at a velocity insufficient to enter orbit. Megaroc was to have a greater fuel capacity and redesigned stabilisation system as to better suit its purpose, and would have been largely under the control of its occupant during the ascent portion of the flight, although provision for remote radio control from the ground was also to be present. Furthermore, both the rocket and capsule would have been reusable. It was speculated that, in addition to scientific work, Megaroc would have been a viable intelligence asset during the Cold War.

The Ministry of Supply received the proposal on 23 December 1946. An anticipated timetable for Megaroc foresaw a five-year development period, which included a series of practical tests and mockups, prior to the first all-up flight of Megaroc taking place as early as 1951. However, during 1947, the ministry declined to proceed further with Megaroc. At the time, the economic circumstances of the United Kingdom limited funding, and the British government chose to concentrate on building up its nuclear capabilities as well as several other more conventional research programmes, often with a clearer and more immediate military application.

== History ==
Even prior to the formal conclusion of the Second World War, various nations endeavored to capitalise on Nazi Germany's advances in various areas, in particular aerospace and projects such as the V-2 rocket. Britain was amongst those countries, which included United States, the Soviet Union, and France, that captured elements of the V-2 programme, leading to several rockets being assembled at British direction to conduct test flights under Operation Backfire. These tests revealed to British officials that numerous fundamental problems in rocketry had been overcome with the V-2, including a suitable rocket motor, capable onboard guidance system, and a speedy fuel delivery system amongst others. The information obtained was quickly circulated across the British scientific community, including the British Interplanetary Society (BIS).

During 1946, the designer and artist R. A. Smith, who was also a member of BIS, produced a detailed proposal under which the V-2 would be extensively redesigned to carry humans. Changes would have included the enlargement and reinforcement of the structure and the substitution of the V-2's one-tonne warhead with a man-carrying capsule inside of a jettisonable nose cone. This capsule was unpressurised and lacked air conditioning; instead, the occupying personnel were to be reliant upon a suitable high-altitude flight suit for life support. While derived from the V-2, very few components remained in their original form; while elements such as the turbo pumps were largely the same, their orientation was changed. The tankage was of greater radius and length to carry an increased fuel load partly offset by a lighter payload. The stabilisation fins at the base of the V-2 were removed, instead, the rocket was intended to spin slightly to improve stability; this feature has since become commonplace on subsequent rockets, but was unusual for early rockets.

Megaroc would have been capable of flying along a parabolic trajectory to reach a maximum height of roughly 300 km (190 mi) above the Earth, but would not have been powerful enough to carry a person into orbit. During the ascent of the rocket and acceleration picked up with the reduction in mass, the thrust could be reduced as to limit the g load to 3.3. Automatic radio control of the rocket would have been possible as well as manual control by the occupant. During the ascent, the communication system would have used four-dipole arrays arranged in blisters near the rocket's stern. Once above the dense atmosphere, the main engine would cut off and the capsule would separate from the main rocket body via a crew-operated charge of compressed air, after which communication would rely upon arrays situated under the floor of the capsule. Attitude stabilisation of the capsule was achieved via hydrogen peroxide jets. Free movement inside the capsule would have been possible during this phase of flight, and thus various mission activities and experiments could have been carried out. A pair of windows were incorporated into the capsule, permitting the occupant to conduct observations of the Earth, atmosphere, and Sun; it has been speculated that Megaroc could have been used for spying on enemy territory.

The capsule would have started its descent after around five minutes of weightlessness; it was furnished with a relatively basic heat shield to cope with the thermal challenges of atmospheric entry. In addition, both the capsule and the rocket itself were to be provisioned with parachutes to slow their descent, which would have deployed at an altitude of 113 km (70 mi), which were intended to permit a relatively soft landing and potentially made both elements of the spacecraft reusable. The capsule was outfitted with a crumple skirt to absorb some of the shock from landing; it would have been capable of landing both at sea and on land. Upon touchdown, the parachute would have been promptly released to prevent the cabin being dragged along.

On 23 December 1946, Smith submitted his proposal to the Ministry of Supply. A tentative programme timetable had provisioned for a five year period of development and risk reduction activities, after which Megaroc would have potentially made its first all-up flight either in 1951 or 1952. It was expected that preliminary experiments would be performed to confirm the practicality of the design. Though slightly smaller, Megaroc had a great deal in common with the Mercury-Redstone Launch Vehicle that would put the first American in space some 15 years later. Megaroc would be proposed several months after a similar V-2-derived rocket, the Tikhonravov Suborbital project, had been proposed in the Soviet Union.

During early 1947, the Ministry of Supply decided to reject the Megaroc proposal. The British government had chosen to concentrate its efforts on developing its nuclear capabilities, various other aerospace ventures, and more conventional research programmes which had a more immediate military use. The economic circumstances of the United Kingdom were particularly poor in the aftermath of the Second World War, meaning that there were only limited resources available for non-essential programmes. Even as the nation's financial condition improved over time, the British government typically chose to avoid engaging in the more expensive elements of space research, except when derived relatively cheaply from military projects.
