= Paul Rincon =

British journalist

Paul Rincon (born 1977) is a British journalist specialising in science and technology. He currently works as a science and technology journalist for BBC News, where he has reported across online, radio and television platforms. He covers a wide range of subjects, including astronomy, crewed and robotic spaceflight, human evolution, crustaceans and particle physics.

== Popular science ==
Rincon received a special citation at the 2009 Sir Arthur Clarke Awards, held at Charterhouse School in Godalming, UK, where the BBC News Science Team was awarded the prize for best space reporting.
