= Barnes Wallis Moth Machine =

Aircraft designed for collecting flying insects

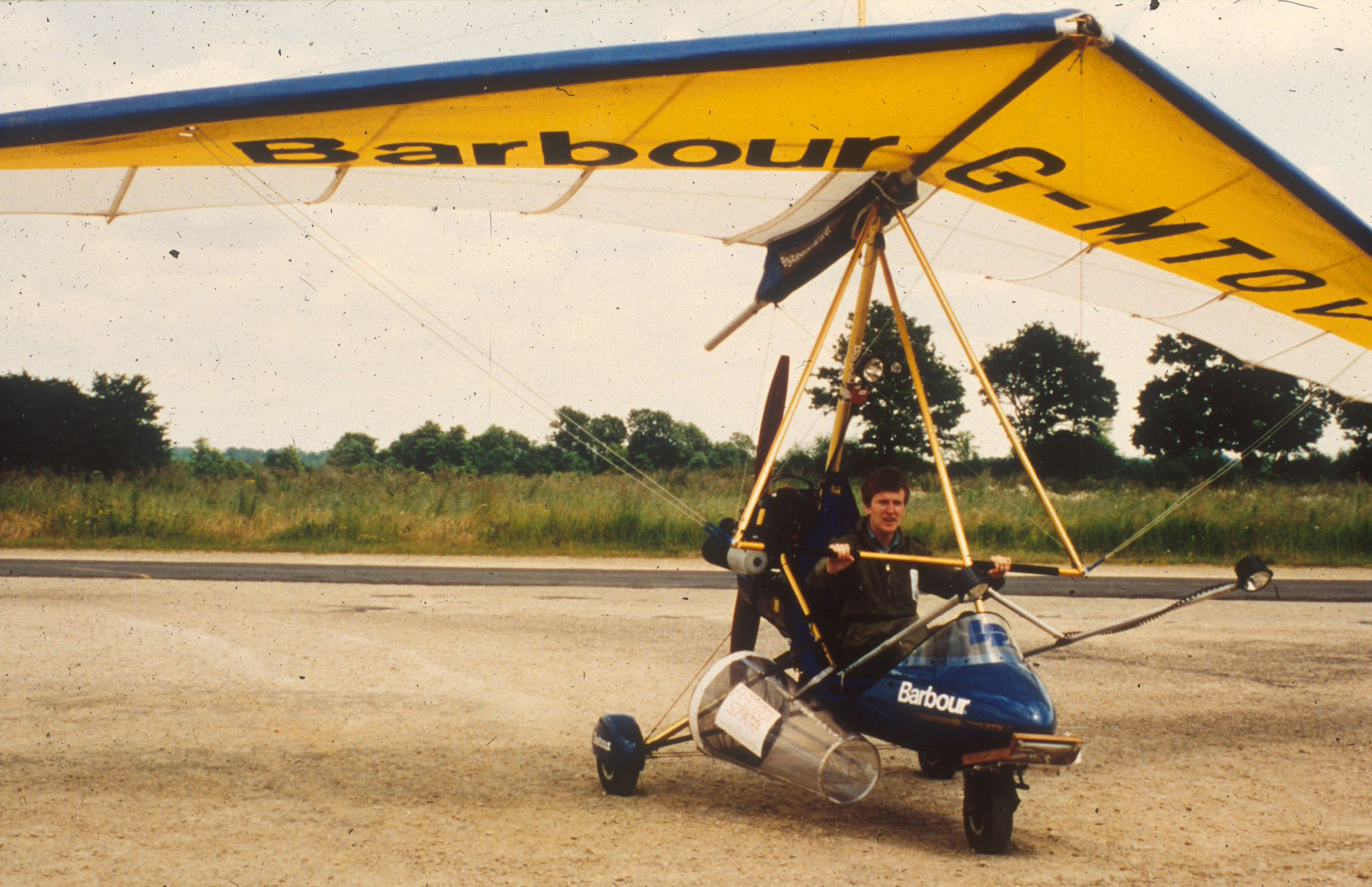
Barnes Wallis Moth Machine, 1992

The Barnes Wallis Moth Machine was a modified microlight aircraft designed for collecting moths and other flying insects over rainforest canopies. The core machine was a Pegasus Q microlight aircraft. Modifications for moth catching were designed by Charles Cockell and implemented by a team of engineers at Enstone Airfield, England.

The machine was test flown in Oxford by Charles Cockell and then flown over the rainforest canopy in Sumatra, Indonesia in 1993 by Cockell in an effort to catch moths to catalog the diversity of moths in the rainforest as part of a biodiversity study of the Kerinci Seblat National Park. The machine had several modifications for moth catching: 1) Ultraviolet lights under the front of the aircraft for attracting moths during systematic sweeps of the forest, 2) A moth catching device consisting of an inverted funnel with a pleated butterfly net at the end for trapping moths scooped during flight, 3) A forward facing one million candlepower lamp to avoid trees whilst flying during dusk, 4) Two one million candlepower lamps pointing downwards at an angle to estimate height above the forest canopy, using a similar principle to that adopted for night flying during the 617 Squadron Dams raids in World War II and developed by Barnes Wallis (for whom the machine was named), 5) Infra-red night vision system for improving visibility during night time moth catching, provided by 617 Squadron and worn by the entomologist pilot.

The Patrons of the expedition were Susannah York, David Bellamy and 617 Squadron. Corporate Patrons were Barbour, BP, Pilkington and Containerway.

The machine was flown for several moth catching sorties over the rainforest, north of the Sumatran town of Bengkulu during July 1993. Moths were also caught using UV lamps on the ground.

During the expedition, whilst attempting to land the moth machine in a rainforest clearing, it clipped the top of a tree and crashed, destroying the machine, although Cockell escaped uninjured.
