= Jean-Marie Luton =

French aerospace engineer (1942–2020)

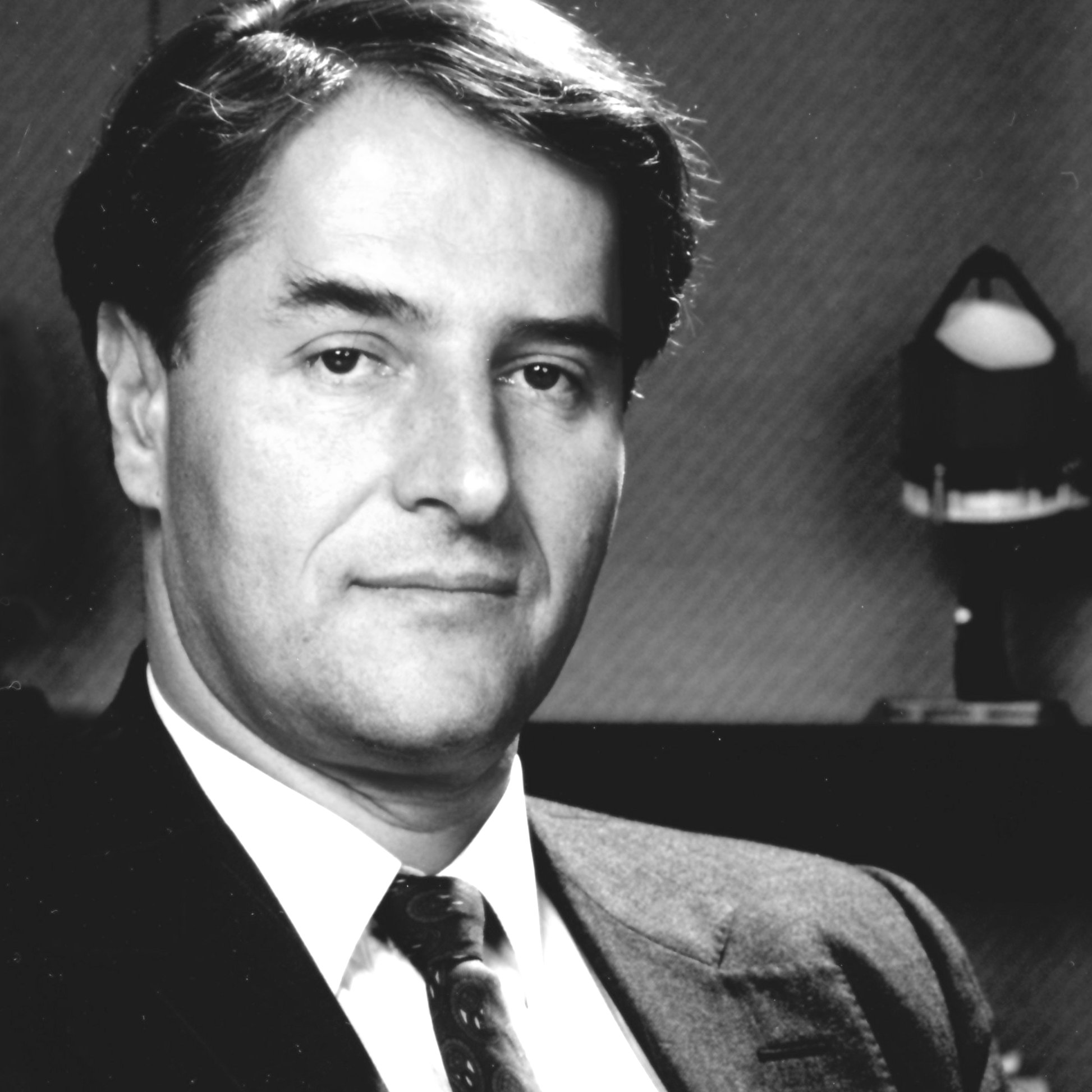
- Born: 4 August 1942; Chamalières, France
- Died: 16 April 2020 (aged 77); 15th arrondissement of Paris, France
- Known for: Director General of European Space Agency
- Scientific career
- Fields: Aerospace Engineering
- Workplaces: European Space Agency; CNES

Jean-Marie Luton (4 August 1942 – 16 April 2020) was a French aerospace engineer who was the director general of the European Space Agency from 1990 to 1997. He also served in French space agency CNES and as the head of the aerospace arm of Aérospatiale. He was the chairman and CEO of Arianespace from 1997 to 2002. He was a member of the International Academy of Astronautics (IAA) and the Association Aéronautique et Astronautique de France (AAAF). He retired in 2007.

Luton was awarded the title of Officer of the Légion d'honneur and Commander of the Ordre national du Mérite. In 1985, he received the Astronautics Prize by the International Academy of Astronautics.

== Sources ==
- Jean-Marie Luton
- Jean-Marie Luton, 1942-2020
