= Magali Vaissière =

French telecommunications engineer

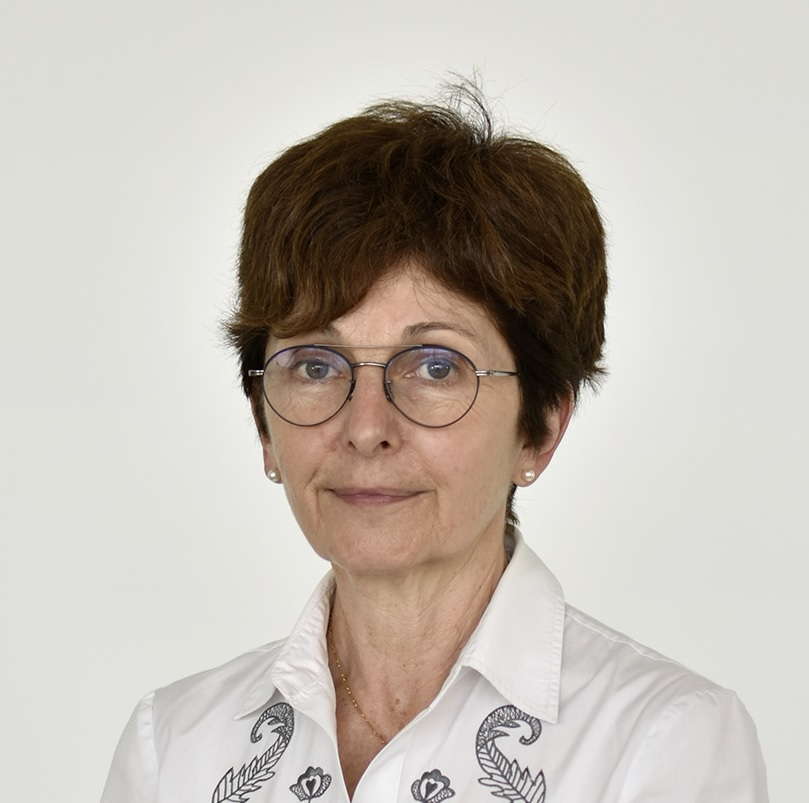
- Born: 15 July 1957 (age 69); Montpellier, France
- Education: Télécom ParisTech
- Occupation: Engineer

Magali Vaissière was Director of Telecommunications and Integrated Applications at the European Space Agency (ESA), from 2008 until 2020. She was responsible for the agency's programme of Advanced Research in Telecommunications System (ARTES).

Vaissière was also head of the European Centre for Space Applications and Telecommunications (ECSAT), located at Harwell, Oxfordshire.

== Biography ==
Vaissière was born on 15 July 1957 in Montpellier (Hérault). After studying as an engineer at the Ecole Nationale Supérieure des Telecommunications de Paris (Telecom Paris Tech), she obtained a Master of Science from Stanford University. She also has an Executive MBA from the Centre de Perfectionnement aux Affaires.

After graduating, Vaissière worked for Thomson-CSF Radars for nine years then for EADS-Astrium Satellite for 15 years.

== Awards ==
- 2007: Prix Irène-Joliot-Curie in the category in Women in Companies
- 2008: Knighted in the Legion of Honour for services to telecommunications
- 2017: UK Space Personality of the Year
- 2018: Sir Arthur Clarke Award in the category Space Achievement by Industry/Project Individual
- 2018: Forbes The World's Top 50 Women in Tech
