= British Interplanetary Society =

Space advocacy organization

Coordinates: 51.4843°N 0.1228°W

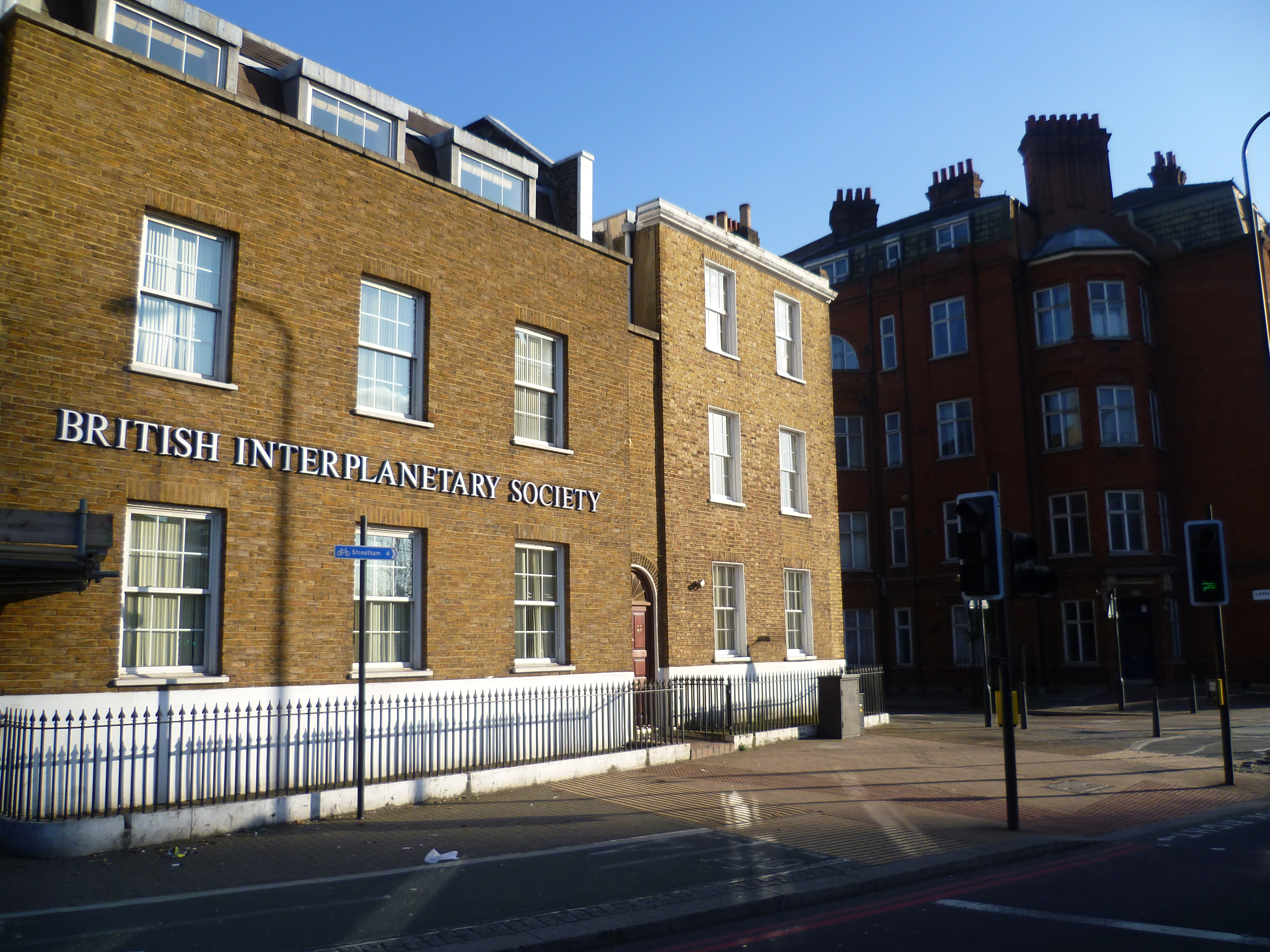
- Abbreviation: BIS
- Formation: 13 October 1933
- Founded at: Liverpool, UK
- Legal status: Non-profit organisation
- Purpose: UK space advocacy, promotion of astronautics, research
- Headquarters: 27/29 South Lambeth Road, Vauxhall, London, SW8 1SZ
- Region served: International Membership
- Members: Anyone with an interest in space
- President: Colin Philp
- CEO: John Lewin
- Main organ: Board of Trustees
- Affiliations: International Astronautical Federation
- Website: bis-space.com

The British Interplanetary Society (BIS), founded in Liverpool in 1933 by Philip E. Cleator, is the oldest existing space advocacy organisation in the world. Its aim is exclusively to support and promote astronautics and space exploration.

== Structure ==
It is a non-profit organisation with headquarters in London and is financed by members' contributions.

It is situated on South Lambeth Road (A203) near Vauxhall station.

== History ==
The BIS was only preceded in astronautics by the American Interplanetary Society (founded 1930), the German VfR (founded 1927), and the Soviet Society for Studies of Interplanetary Travel (founded 1924), but unlike those it never became absorbed into a national industry. Thus it is now the world's oldest existing space advocacy body.

When originally formed in October 1933, the BIS aimed not only to promote and raise the public profile of astronautics, but also to undertake practical experimentation into rocketry along similar lines to the organisations above. However, early in 1936 the society discovered that this ambition was thwarted by the Explosives Act 1875, which prevented any private testing of liquid-fuel rockets in the United Kingdom.

=== Proposals for the design of space vehicles ===
In the late 1930s, the group devised a project of landing people on the Moon by a multistage rocket, each stage of which would have many narrow solid-fuel rockets. Their lander was gumdrop-shaped but otherwise quite like the Lunar Module. As it was considered that the cabin would have to rotate, BIS member Ralph A. Smith, who helped re-establish the society post-WW2, invented the first instrument for space travel: the Coelostat, a navigation mechanism that would ingeniously cancel out the rotating view. R.A. Smith and Harry Ross were the aerospace visionaries named on the original patent. Smith also authored and illustrated the 1947 book 'The Exploration of the Moon' showing the first ever conceptual 'orbital satellite' (text by Arthur C. Clarke), which is said to have inspired both John F. Kennedy and Stanley Kubrick.

In a November 1949 conference in the BIS, Harry Ross presented a paper on a concept of a Lunar spacesuit. In the paper, Ross had examined the problem of a 68 kg lunar space suit which could be worn for up to 12 hours, within the temperature range of +120 °C to −150 °C.

In 1946, the BIS started a programme known as Megaroc. The purpose of the programme was to develop a Sub-orbital spaceflight that could provide crewed ascents to a maximum of 1 million feet (304 km). The craft was made by enlarging and re-designing a V-2 rocket after it was noted by H.E. Ross in 1946 that the V-2 rocket was "nearly big enough to carry a man." The project was noted to be 10 years ahead of its time by NASA engineers who reviewed it. The same NASA engineers predicted the rocket would have been capable of first achieving a crewed suborbital flight between 1949 and 1951, and capable of sending people to space reliably by 1951.

=== Role in international space ===
During the second International Astronautical Congress, held in London in 1951, the BIS was one of 13 national space societies who together founded the International Astronautical Federation. The other founding members no longer exist as national societies, leaving only the BIS.

=== Nearest stars ===
In 1978, the society published a starship study called Project Daedalus, which was a detailed feasibility study for a simple uncrewed interstellar flyby mission to Barnard's Star using present-day technology and a reasonable extrapolation of near-future capabilities. Daedalus was to have used a pellet driven nuclear-pulse fusion rocket to accelerate to 12 per cent of the speed of light.

=== Mars ===
The latest in this series of far-reaching studies produced the Project Boreas report, which designed a crewed station for the Martian North Pole. The report was short-listed for the 2007 Sir Arthur Clarke Awards in the category of Best Written Presentation.

== Publications ==
The BIS publishes the academic journal Journal of the British Interplanetary Society and the monthly magazine Spaceflight. In 2008, the BIS published Interplanetary, a history of the society to date.

== Awards given by the society ==
The science and science fiction writer Sir Arthur C. Clarke was a well-known former chairman of the British Interplanetary Society. The society was presented with the first Special Award, from the 2005 Sir Arthur Clarke Awards. This was a gift of Clarke's choice, independent of the judging panel. In 2008 the society's magazine, Spaceflight, edited by Clive Simpson, was the winner of the award for Best Space Reporting.

Charles Chilton joined the society before writing and producing the science-fiction radio trilogy Journey Into Space.

The Sir Patrick Moore Medal was made possible by long-time Fellow of the BIS, Sir Patrick Moore, to recognise outstanding contributions to the society.

The British Interplanetary Society UK-Born Astronaut Silver Pin Award was introduced in 2009, this BIS silver pin award recognises the achievement of UK-born individuals who have undertaken a spaceflight into full Earth orbit.

The Rising Star Awards were founded in 2021 by BIS Fellows, Vix Southgate and Alan Bond and run by the BIS NextGen Network. In 2021, the RSA awards celebrated 'Women in Space', to coincided with the World Space Week theme of the same year. The five winners were presented with BIS Silver Comet Brooches and certificates.

== Responsibilities ==
The British Interplanetary Society, collaborates and coordinates at a national and international level to promote space and astronautics.

- Coordinator for the UK Selection for the International Astronautical Federation's IAC Student Paper Competition, in partnership with the Institution of Engineering and Technology Technical Network.
- Official UK National Coordinators for World Space Week, supporting and encouraging the creation of educational opportunities, activities, and events during 4–10 October.

== Arms ==
Coat of arms of British Interplanetary Society
Notes Granted 19 June 1986 Crest Upon a helm with a wreath Argent and azure a demi horse Argent winged gorged with a laurel wreath and supporting between its hooves an astral crown Or. Escutcheon Azure a fess dancetty of two points conjoined to as many pallets between three mullets one in chief two in base Argent. Supporters On either side a winged lion regardant Or the compartment comprising clouds Proper.

== Logo ==
In 2020, the British Interplanetary Society website was redesigned and updated with a new-look logo, with a streamlined sans-serif version of the original 'Stag' font and both the banner and medallion designs incorporating the BIS motto 'From Imagination To Reality'.

== See also ==
- Archibald Low, one of the founder members of the BIS and its President from 1936–1951.
- British space programme
- National Space Centre
- Project Daedalus
- Project Boreas
- Project Icarus
- Megaroc
