= Jean-Jacques Dordain =

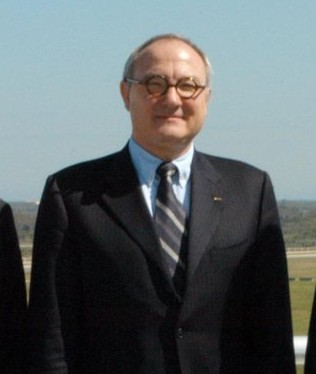
- Dordain in 2006

6th Director General of the European Space Agency
- In office July 2003 – 2015
- Preceded by: Antonio Rodotà
- Succeeded by: Johann-Dietrich Wörner

Personal details
- Born: 1946 (age 79–80) Lille, France
- Education: École Centrale Paris

Jean-Jacques Dordain (born 1946) is a French scientist specialising in aerospace. He was director general of the European Space Agency between 2003 and 2015.

== Early life and education ==
Jean-Jacques Dordain was born in Lille, northern France, in 1946.

He graduated from École Centrale Paris in 1968.

== Career ==
Dordain began his scientific career in the French Aerospace Research Agency (ONERA) and later worked as a professor at the National Higher School of Aeronautics and Aerospace in the 1970s and 1980s. He has conducted extensive research in rocket engines and microgravity experiments. He was also a European astronaut candidate.

In 1998 he was executive secretary at the Japanese Space Agency (then NASDA, now JAXA) and later started as director of launchers at ESA, where he became Director General in July 2003.

He also holds the honorary function of Chancellor of the International Space University.

On 1 July 2015, he was succeeded as director general of the ESA by Johann-Dietrich Woerner of Germany.

As of 2025, Dordain heads the board of the Karman Project, a global fellowship program for space industry leaders headquartered in Berlin.

== Recognition ==
In 2019, Dordain was elected as a member into the National Academy of Engineering for contributions to complex space systems and leadership of space exploration programs worldwide.

Preceded by Antonio Rodotà	Director General of the European Space Agency; 2003–2015	Succeeded by Johann-Dietrich Woerner
