= Johann-Dietrich Wörner =

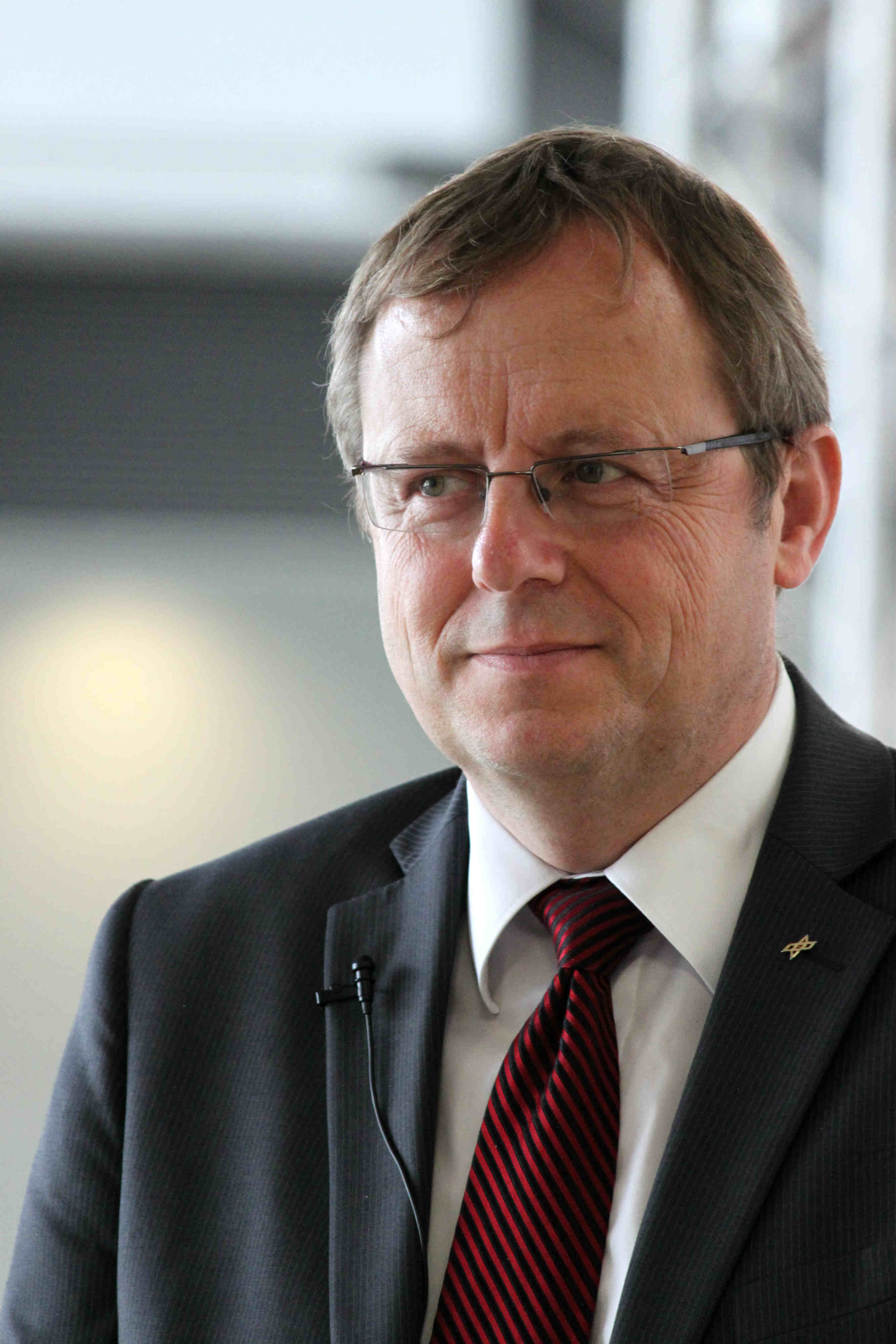

Director General of the European Space Agency
- In office 1 July 2015 – February 2021
- Preceded by: Jean-Jacques Dordain
- Succeeded by: Josef Aschbacher

Personal details
- Born: 18 July 1954 (age 72) Kassel, West Germany (now Germany)
- Education: TU Berlin, TU Darmstadt

Johann-Dietrich "Jan" Wörner (German pronunciation: [ˈjoːhan ˈdiːtʁɪç ˈvœʁnɐ]; born 18 July 1954) is a German civil engineer, university professor and former president of Technische Universität Darmstadt. He served as chairman of the executive board of the German Aerospace Center DLR from 1 March 2007 to 30 June 2015. On 1 July 2015, he succeeded Jean-Jacques Dordain as Director General of the European Space Agency.

== Education ==
Worner was born in Kassel. He studied civil engineering at Technische Universität Berlin and at Technische Hochschule Darmstadt, now called Technische Universität Darmstadt. He visited Japan in 1982 as part of a research stay on the subject of earthquake safety. In 1985, he did his doctorate on component–building interactions during earthquakes. Dr Johan-Dietrich Worner. (Note: Ein Beitrag zur realistischen Beschreibung der Komponenten-Bauwerk-Wechselwirkung bei Erdbeben)

== Career ==
Interview with Wörner while at the launch of Expedition 56-57 from the Baikonur Cosmodrome to the International Space Station

Until 1990, Wörner worked for the engineering office König und Heunisch in Frankfurt. In the same year, he was appointed professor for solid construction and head of the testing and research institute at TH Darmstadt. He founded his own engineering office Wörner und Partner in 1994. From 1992 to 1994, Wörner served as dean of the university's civil engineering department. Starting in 1993, he also held the office of technical director at the Gelsenkirchen institute for glass construction. Wörner was appointed a test engineer for structural analysis and solid construction in 1994 and a professor of structural engineering in 1995.

On 28 June 1995, Wörner was elected president by the assembly of what was then called the TH Darmstadt and lead the university from 24 July 1995 to 28 February 2007.

Wörner was elected deputy speaker for Universities in the German Rectors' Conference in 2002. In 2003, he became speaker of ARGE TU/TH, the working group of universities and institutes of technology. In 2003 he joined the science council's Ranking working group and assumed the chair for structural analysis for superstructures at the university's architecture department as a provisional substitute. In 2004, he joined the science council's Universities working group.

Between 2010 and 2011, Wörner served on the High-Level Group on Aviation and Aeronautics Research launched by European Commissioners Siim Kallas and Máire Geoghegan-Quinn. In February 2011, the State Government of Baden-Württemberg appointed him to serve as a mediator for the controversial railroad infrastructure project Stuttgart 21, after he had already mediated talks concerning airport constructions in Frankfurt.

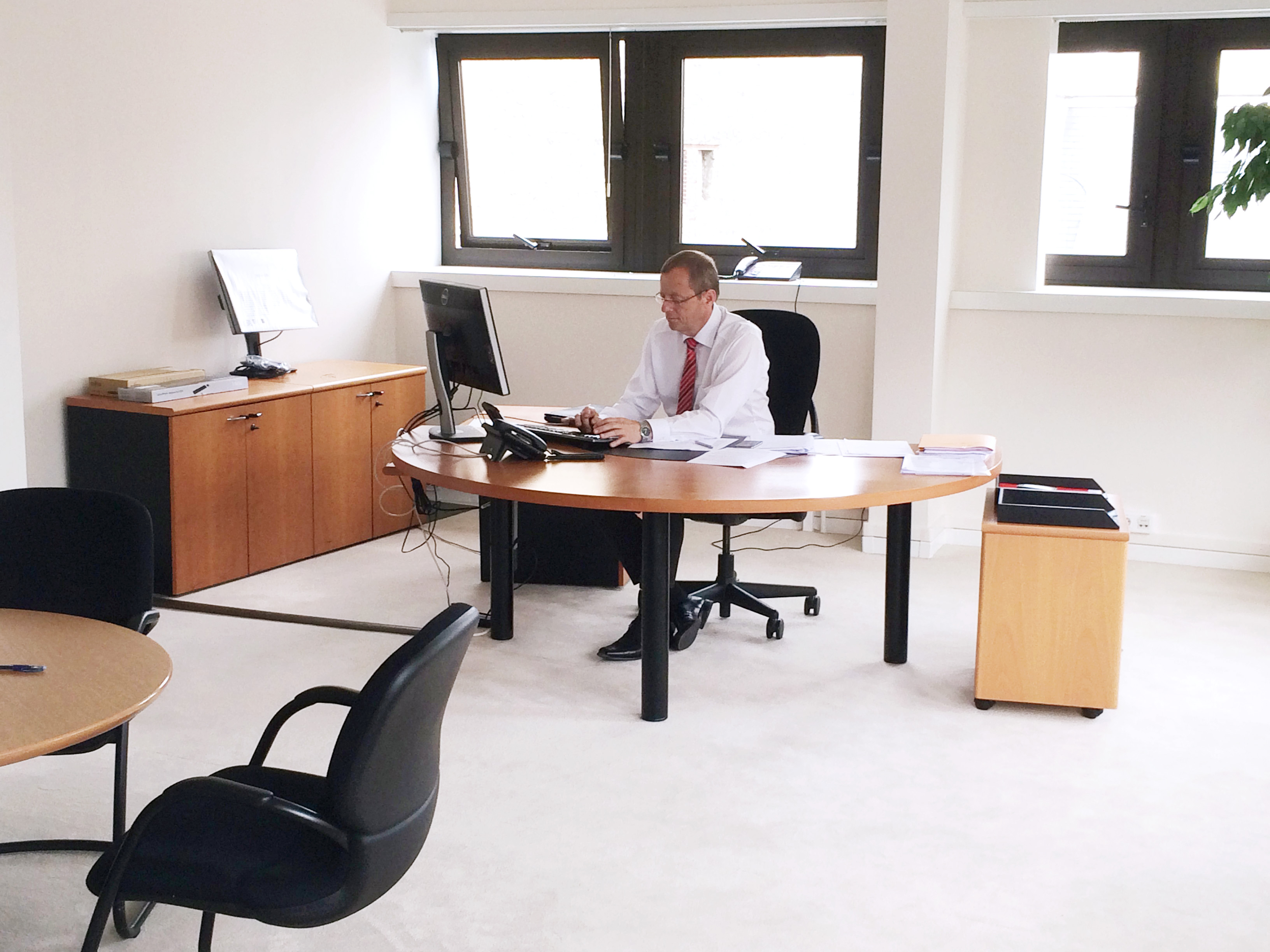
Johann-Dietrich Wörner, ESA Director General

On 18 December 2014, the European Space Agency announced that Wörner would assume the office of director general for four years on 1 July 2015.

On 19 October 2016 Wörner claimed that the despite the crash at the attempted landing, the Schiaparelli mission was still a success from an engineering standpoint because of the data gathered. Not only was the parachute released early, but moreover the retrorockets fired for only 3s rather than the required 30s. The probe crashed into the surface at 300 km per hour, leaving a 40m wide impact site.

In 2015, Wörner has proposed cooperation among countries and companies on lunar capabilities, a concept referred to as Moon Village.

== Other activities ==
=== Corporate boards ===
- Röhm GmbH, Member of the Supervisory Board

=== Non-profit organizations ===
- Director, Regionales Dialogforum Flughafen Frankfurt (since 2000)
- Berlin-Brandenburgischen Akademie der Wissenschaften (since 2002)
- Deutsche Akademie der Naturforscher Leopoldina, section technical sciences (since 2002, elected senator in 2006)
- Conseil d'administration, École Centrale Paris (2000) and École Centrale de Lyon (2005)
- Deutsche Akademie der Technikwissenschaften
- Advisory board, Chinesisch-Deutsches Hochschulkolleg, Tongji University
- Centrum für Hochschulentwicklung
- President, Conference of European Schools for Advanced Engineering Education and Research (2004)
- Projektgruppe Energiepolitisches Programm, German Federal Ministry for Economic Affairs
- Honorary member, CLUSTER (2007)
- Vice president, Helmholtz-Gemeinschaft Deutscher Forschungszentren (2007)
- Deputy chairman, ESA Council (2007)
- Technologie- und Innovationsrat des Landes Berlin (2008)
- Editor, yearbook Beton-Kalender

== Awards and honors ==
- Honorary doctorates: State University of New York (1998); Technical University of Moldova (1999); Politehnica University of Bucharest (2000); Saint Petersburg State University of Economics (2000); École centrale de Lyon (2003); Mongolian Technical University (2005)
- Preis der Vereinigung von Freunden der Technischen Hochschule Darmstadt (2007)
- Johann-Heinrich-Merck-Ehrung (2007)
- Fraunhofer-Medaille (2007)
- Officer's Cross of the Order of Merit of the Federal Republic of Germany (2016)

== Additional reading ==
- "Publications 1979–1990", Institut für Statik und Konstruktion – Technische Universität Darmstadt, Technische Universität Darmstadt, archived from the original on 4 July 2015
- Rieger, Arnold (1 February 2011), "Neuer Schlichter will Runden Tisch", Stuttgarter Zeitung (in German), OCLC 473877881, archived from the original on 16 January 2014
- Johann-Dietrich Woerner to be Director General of ESA, ESA, 18 December 2014, archived from the original on 4 July 2015
- Bekanntgabe der Verleihungen vom 1. März 2016 (in German), Bundespräsidialamt, 1 March 2016, archived from the original on 25 September 2016

Preceded by Jean-Jacques Dordain	Director General of the European Space Agency; 2015–2021	Succeeded by Josef Aschbacher
