= Anu Ojha =

British space exploration administrator

- Born: Anupam Ojha
- Awards: Sir Arthur Clarke Award
- Scientific career
- Institutions: Great Barr School; National Space Centre; European Space Agency; STFC; UK Space Agency

Anupam Ojha OBE (born 1968) is a British space exploration administrator employed at the UK Space Agency. He is a Director of the National Space Centre, serves on the Science and Technology Facilities Council, as a member of the European Space Agency Human Spaceflight and Exploration Science Advisory Committee (HESAC).

== Career ==
Ojha taught physics, mathematics and sciences at a range of UK all-ability secondary schools culminating in becoming Assistant Headteacher at Great Barr School. In 2003 he was awarded Advanced Skills Teacher status. He was made a National Lead Practitioner for physics by the UK Specialist Schools and Academies Trust in 2010, and continues to teach physics at Loughborough College.

Ojha started working on teacher training programmes for BNSC (the forerunner organisation to the UK Space Agency) and European Space Agency in 2007. In this capacity he leads teacher and student (school and undergraduate level) training programmes. His work helped demonstrate that space related education has a profound impact on student achievement, resulting in better than predicted grades at GCSE and A-level. He has led the National Space Academy since it launched in 2008. He was awarded the 2010 Sir Arthur Clarke Award for Inspiration. Since 2016 he has been the lead for Skills/Education/Human spaceflight and robotic exploration in the UK Government's programmes of strategic collaboration in Space Science and Technology with China.

In 2014 Ojha was appointed OBE for services to science education in the Queen's Birthday Honours. He led the Astro Academy Principia Education Programme involving experiments conducted by European Space Agency astronaut Tim Peake during his time on the International Space Station. He served as a consultant for the ESA SOHO orbiting solar observatory.

In 2016 Ojha was appointed as an Honorary Professor in the Department of Physics and Astronomy at the University of Leicester. He is co-investigator for the planetary sampling tool SPLIT, which is being developed for future Mars exploration missions. He has served as the President of the Astronautics Records Commission of the Federation Aeronautique Internationale.

Ojha was appointed to the STFC Council in 2018, and the Global Space Congress Advisory Board of the UAE Space Agency. He has a long-standing interest in why people believe conspiracy theories and misinformation and the societal ramifications of this.

== Personal life ==
Ojha is a skydiver who has completed nearly 1,500 jumps. He acted as an independent analyst for the Red Bull Stratos stratospheric jump of Felix Baumgartner and has made many technical and general presentations on stratospheric skydiving and human survival in extreme environments including as a keynote presentation at the 2019 Skydive Expo of the British Parachute Association. He is supporting the neutral buoyancy facility the Blue Abyss project.
