= Antonio Rodotà =

Director General of the European Space Agency

- Born: 24 December 1935; Cosenza, Italy
- Died: 23 February 2006 (aged 70); Rome, Italy
- Known for: Director General of European Space Agency
- Scientific career
- Fields: Electronics engineering
- Workplaces: European Space Agency; Alenia

Antonio Rodotà (24 December 1935–23 February 2006) was the fifth Director General of the European Space Agency (ESA), serving from 1997 until 2003. He died in Rome on February 23, 2006, aged 70. He was the brother of Stefano Rodotà, a former Italian politician proposed by Movimento 5 Stelle as President of the Italian Republic. He belongs to Arbëreshë people from Cosenza area in Southern Italy.

== Early years ==
Rodotà was born on 24 December 1935 in Cosenza, Italy. He came from the Arbëreshë community of San Benedetto Ullano. After graduating from University of Rome in 1959 as an electronics engineer, he began his career with SISPRE SpA, Italy.

== Career ==
In 1965 he served as Italian delegate to NATO in Paris, then joined Italian company Selenia from 1966 to 1980, followed by three years as head of the Compagnia Nazionale Satelliti. He then moved on to Alenia-Spazio in 1983 where he held a series of senior positions before becoming chief executive in 1995. Under his leadership, Alenia became a supplier of space hardware for the International Space Station.

== European Space Agency ==
Before joining ESA, he was director of the Space Division of Finmeccanica (Italy) and a member of the boards of several international companies, as well as Arianespace.

During his term of office at ESA, Rodotà was an active advocate of international cooperation, a promoter of European space activities, and was one of the founders of the Galileo European satellite navigation system.

== Tribute ==
ESA's next Director General Jean-Jacques Dordain paid tribute by saying,

Antonio Rodotà led ESA into the 21st Century. I feel honoured to have had the opportunity to follow his path and to build on the foundations he laid for a renewed Europe in space.

== Sources ==
- Antonio Rodotà
