= Roy Gibson =

British aerospace engineer (born 1924)

Roy Gibson BEM
- Born: 4 July 1924 (age 102); Manchester, England
- Known for: Director General of European Space Agency
- Awards: Allan D. Emil Memorial Award (1983)
- Scientific career
- Fields: Aerospace engineering
- Workplaces: European Space Agency; European Space Research Organisation

Roy Gibson BEM (born 4 July 1924) is a British former aerospace engineer. He served as Director General of ESRO, and the first Director General of ESA, serving from 1975 until 1980.

== Early years ==
Gibson was born in Manchester on 4 July 1924, and educated at Chorlton High School and at the Universities of Oxford and London (London School of Economics).

Early in World War II, Gibson joined the Home Guard, although underage, and subsequently joined the Army as a volunteer at age 18. After officer training at Catterick and commissioning into the Royal Signals, he served with Mountbatten's headquarters in India and Ceylon from 1944 during the Burma Campaign. Late in the campaign, Gibson was posted to Akyab Island and then to Rangoon immediately after the Japanese had evacuated from there.

From 1948 to 1958, he served in the British Colonial Administrative Service in Malaya.

== Career ==
Gibson returned to London to work at the UK Atomic Energy Authority until 1967. He became Deputy Director of the ESRO Technical Centre (ESTEC), until 1971 when he became Director of Administration for ESRO. From 1974 he was Acting Director General of ESRO, and oversaw the transition of the two previous organisations ESRO and ELDO to form the European Space Agency (ESA) in 1975.

Gibson was the first Director General of the British National Space Centre from 1985 to 1987. From 1987 to 1992 he worked at INMARSAT, and then at EUMETSAT. Since then he has served as an aerospace consultant to the ESA and the EU Commission, and has worked on the setting up of the European Environment Agency.

In 1977, Gibson received the Grand Decoration of Honour in Silver with Star for Services to the Republic of Austria.

== Later life ==
Gibson turned 100 on 4 July 2024.

He was awarded the British Empire Medal (BEM) in the 2025 New Year Honours for services to space.
