= Jenny Cockell =

British psychic and author

Jenny Cockell (born 10 July 1953 in Barnet, Hertfordshire) is an English podiatrist who in the mid-1990s came to fame for writing about her claims of reincarnation.

== Paranormal claims ==
In her book Yesterday's Children, Cockell discusses what she describes as past life memories of life as Mary Sutton in early-20th century Ireland. The book chronicles Cockell's research into Sutton's life and her subsequent reunion with Sutton's children, some of whom accepted Cockell as the reincarnation of their mother and all of whom accepted her memories as being those of their mother. Cockell describes how reporters from the BBC and The Society for Psychical Research interviewed witnesses who stated that she had spoken about her past lives in childhood and named Malahide as the location. She claims to have drawn a map of Malahide in childhood, in front of a witness. Cockell first started talking about her dreams and memories of "Mary" when she was 4 years old, and after corresponding with a local man whilst researching in 1989 she found the family surname was Sutton. In 1988 she underwent hypnosis after which she claimed to have recovered a few more memories.

In 2000, CBS aired Yesterday's Children, which was a made-for-TV movie adaptation of Cockell's book, with Jane Seymour in the title role. For the TV movie, however, Jenny Cockell was referred to as "Jenny Cole," and the story was somewhat rewritten with, amongst other changes, Jenny Cole being an American rather than a British citizen.

Cockell is also the author of Past Lives, Future Lives, in which she discussed her visions of what she believes could be her future lives obtained initially by precognition then added to by experimental "progression hypnosis" (future version of past life regression), among these a girl, Nadia in Nepal around 2050 who was glimpsed in Across Time And Death and described as "what I now believe to be my next life". Journeys Through Time is about a past life in Japan based on alleged childhood memories.

== Skeptical reception ==
Researcher Joe Nickell has written that Cockell's alleged past life memories and reincarnation claims break down under critical analysis, claiming that Cockell had a tendency to fantasize and that the evidence suggested her past life memories under hypnosis were not memories but the product of her imagination.

Chris French, a professor who studies the psychology of paranormal belief, thinks it might be confirmation bias of life after death and cryptomnesia of the bits of information she researched which contribute to her belief that she has been reincarnated.

== Publications ==
- Yesterday’s Children: The Extraordinary Search for my Past Life Family, Piatkus, 1993 UK
- Across Time and Death: A Mother's Search for Her Past Life Children, Fireside 1994 USA
- Past Lives, Future Lives: One Woman's Extraordinary Experiences of Other Lifetimes, Piatkus, 1996
- Journeys Through Time: Uncovering My Past Lives, Piatkus, 2008
