= A. P. J. Abdul Kalam Centre =

Non-profit organization located primarily in India

Dr. A.P.J. Abdul Kalam Centre is a non-profit organisation located in India with a presence across the country. It was formed in the memory of Dr. A.P.J. Abdul Kalam (11th President of India) in 2015. The organisation was founded by Srijan Pal Singh, an author, social entrepreneur, and public speaker. He also worked as the Officer-on-Special-Duty and Advisor for Science, Technology, and Policy to Dr. A.P.J. Abdul Kalam between 2009 and 2015.

The organisation aspires to create a sustainable and livable planet Earth for humanity by taking forward the vision of Dr. Kalam. It also aims to promote innovations, especially in governance and social enterprises, to improve youth participation in national and international development so as to improve access to education as well as knowledge in all strata of society.

== Pillars ==
=== Education ===
Kalam Centre runs a network of free libraries across remote and low-income regions of India under the banner of Kalam Library. These libraries cater to the reading and learning needs of children in slums, government schools, low-cost private schools, and children observation homes. Collectively, the libraries serve the needs of over 500,000 children. Another initiative is that of Dreamathon which is an annual flagship campaign to ignite the passion for learning among youth. It supports them by providing relevant skills to help them reach their full potential and go beyond. Kalam Centre also has over 500 auxiliary teachers in Telangana under the initiative of Kalam Bharat to help fill the knowledge gaps in government schools.
