= Prisoners' Education Trust =

UK charity

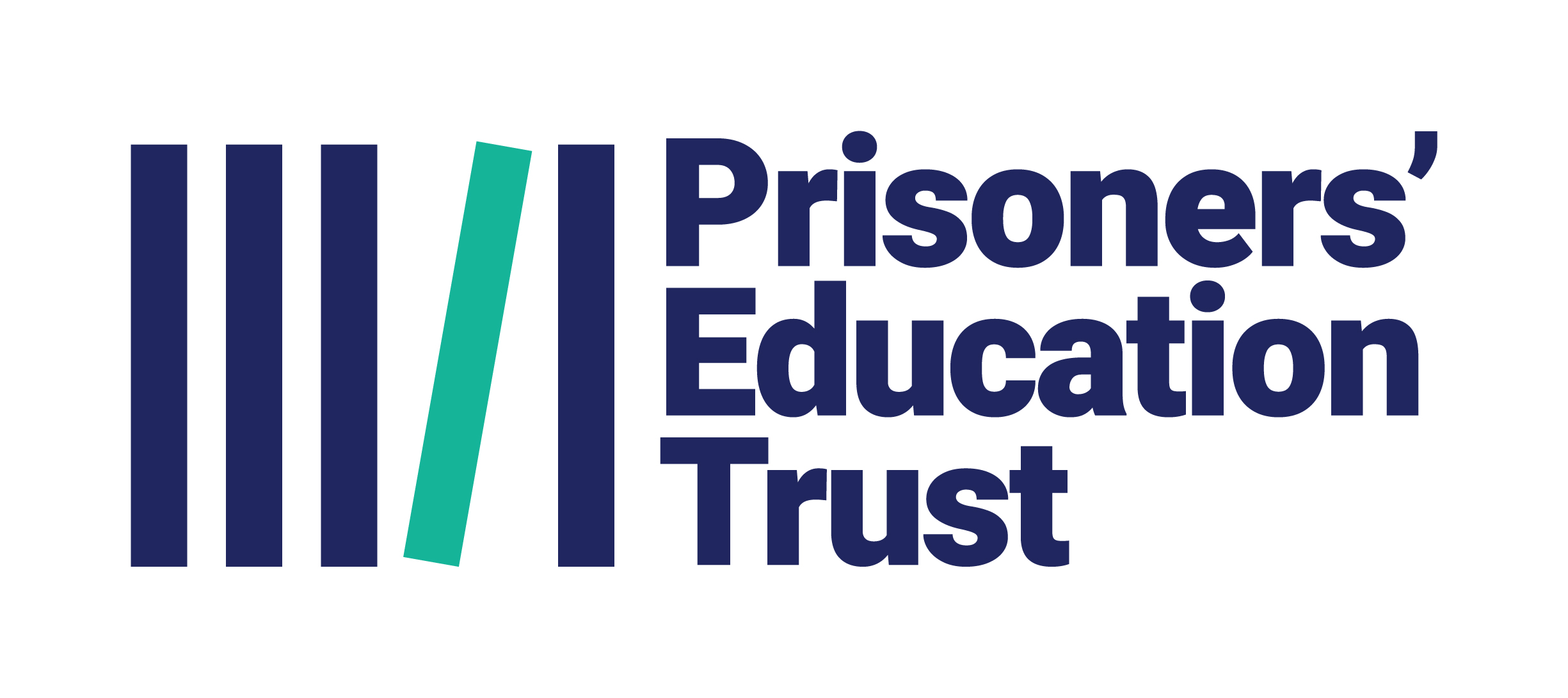
Prisoners' Education Trust logo

Prisoners’ Education Trust (PET) is a registered charity that works in prisons in England and Wales. It offers distance learning courses and educational advice and guidance to people in prison. It was founded in HMP Wandsworth in 1989.

In 2022, PET helped 1,375 people in prison start a course. Its prospectus includes 125 courses including GCSEs and A-levels, Open University Access modules and a wide range of professional courses.

The charity also uses its policy and advocacy work to improve prison education and show prisons, policymakers and the public the impact it can have — for people in prison, their families, and society.

In 2021 the Justice Data Lab – a team of statisticians at the Ministry of Justice – studied the employment and reoffending records in the first year of release for over 9,000 people PET have supported with distance learning in prison.

The research found that the people supported by PET are more likely to get a job within one year than prisoners PET does not support; that even if they do not get a job they are less likely to reoffend within that year than other prisoners who do not get jobs; and that if they do get jobs they are even less likely to reoffend than other prisoners who find employment.
