= Ramesh Oza =

Indian Hindu spiritual leader, singer, and preacher

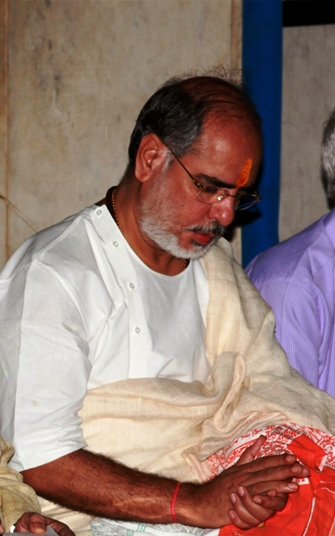

Personal life
- Born: Rameshbhai Oza; 31 August 1959 (age 67) Devka, Rajula Gujarat, India
- Honors: Bhaishri
- Website: www.sandipani.org

Religious life
- Religion: Hinduism
- Founder of: Devka Vidhyapeeth
- Philosophy: Vedanta, Bhakti
- Sect: Vaishnavism

Rameshbhai Oza (born 31 August 1957), also known as Pujya Bhaishri, is an Indian Hindu spiritual leader, preacher, and teacher of Vedanta and Bhakti philosophy. He is known for his discourses on the Bhagavata Purana and has founded educational and spiritual institutions in India.

== Early life ==
Rameshbhai Oza was born in Devka village near Rajula, Saurashtra, Gujarat, India to Vrajlal Kanjibhai Oza and Laxmiben Oza in a Unewal Brahmin family. He completed his early education at Tatvajyoti, a Sanskrit school in Rajula, before moving to Mumbai, where he completed his primary education and a commerce degree. He was inspired by his uncle, Jeevrajbhai Oza, a narrator of the Bhagavata Purana. His uncle noticed his interest that led him to study and practice religious scriptures.

== Career ==
He held his first discourse on the Bhagavata Purana at the age of 13 at Gangotri. At the age of 18, he held Bhagavata Purana recitation in central Mumbai. He has conducted numerous recitations across the world since then.

He founded religious and educational institutes namely Devka Vidyapith and Sandipani Vidyaniketan in Porbandar. Hindu Smitoday, in recognition of his social and spiritual contributions, awarded him Hindu of the Year in 2006.
