= Mir EO-8 =

Eighth expedition to Mir space station

- Mission type: Mir expedition
- Mission duration: 175.8 days (launch to landing)
- Orbits completed: 2770

Expedition
- Space station: Mir
- Began: 2 December 1990
- Ended: 26 May 1991
- Arrived aboard: Soyuz TM-11
- Departed aboard: Soyuz TM-11

Crew
- Crew size: Two
- Members: Viktor Afanasyev; Musa Manarov
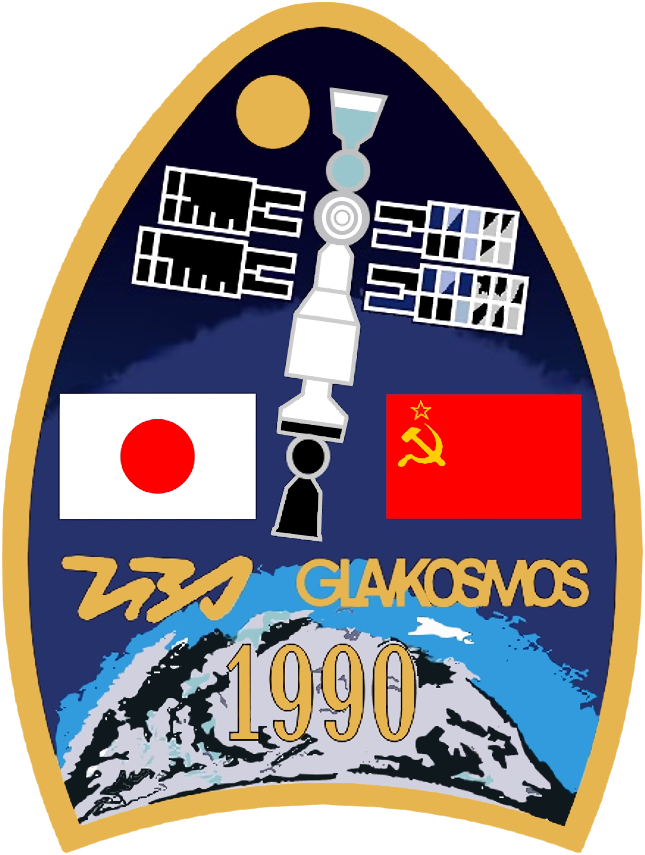
- Long-term Mir expeditions

Mir EO-8 (Russian: Мир ЭО-19) was the eighth crewed expedition to the space station Mir, lasting from December 1990 to May 1991. The crew, consisting of Russian cosmonauts Viktor Afanasyev and Musa Manarov, launched along with space journalist Toyohiro Akiyama on December 2, 1990 aboard Soyuz TM-11. Akiyama returned aboard Soyuz TM-10 with the outgoing Mir EO-7 crew on December 10. Afanasyev and Manarov returned aboard Soyuz TM-11 on May 26, 1991.

== Crew ==
| Mir EO-8 | Name | Spaceflight | Launch | Landing | Duration |
|---|---|---|---|---|---|
| Commander | (Soviet Union) Viktor Afanasyev | First | 2 December 1990; Soyuz TM-11 | 26 May 1991; Soyuz TM-11 | 175.08 days |
| Flight Engineer | (Soviet Union) Musa Manarov | Second and last | 2 December 1990; Soyuz TM-11 | 26 May 1991; Soyuz TM-11 | 175.08 days |

Mir EO-8 was the first spaceflight for Commander Viktor Afanasyev, who completed basic training in 1987 and advanced training in 1988. He served as backup commander for Mir EO-7. EO-8 was Musa Manarov's second spaceflight. He previously flew on Soyuz TM-4, living on Mir from December 21, 1987, to December 21, 1988. Both spent just over 175 days in space and completed 2770 orbits of the Earth during EO-8.

=== Backup crew ===
| Mir EO-8 | Name |
|---|---|
| Commander | (Soviet Union) Anatoly Artsebarsky |
| Flight Engineer | (Soviet Union) Sergei Krikalev |

== Mission highlights ==
=== Crew launch and arrival ===
The crew of Mir EO-8 was launched to the Mir space station on December 2, 1990, on the Soyuz TM-11 spacecraft. Joining Afanasyev and Manarov for launch and trip to Mir was Japanese journalist Toyohiro Akiyama, an employee of TBS. TBS, a Japanese television network, paid approximately US$28 million for Akiyama's flight. Soyuz TM-11 arrived and docked with Mir two days after launch on December 4, 1990.

=== Mission operations ===
While aboard Mir, Akiyama made one ten-minute television broadcast and two twenty-minute radio broadcasts from the station each day he was in space. He used broadcasting equipment that was delivered to the station by a Progress-M spacecraft and set up by the EO-7 crew prior to the arrival of EO-8. Akiyama returned to Earth on December 10 with the outgoing EO-7 crew aboard Soyuz TM-10 after approximately one week in space. The landing of Akiyama and TM-10 was broadcast live from Kazakhstan by TBS.

Afanasyev and Manarov performed their first extra-vehicular activity (EVA), or spacewalk, on January 7, 1991. During the excursion, the pair repaired a hatch hinge on the Kristall module that was damaged in July 1990. After completing the initial objective Afanasyev and Manarov maintained equipment on the exterior of the station, including the retrieval of a television camera from the exterior of the Kvant-2 module for repair inside the station. The spacewalk lasted five hours and eighteen minutes.

During their second spacewalk on January 23, the crew extended the Strela boom to facilitate the transfer of the Kristall module's duel solar arrays to the Kvant module. Afanasyev and Manarov re-entered Mir after five hours and thirty-three minutes.

As the orbital station passed over the Persian Gulf, Afanasyev and Manarov were able to observe fires, smoke plumes and an oil spill as a result of the Gulf War.

The uncrewed Progress M-7 supply craft was scheduled to dock on March 21. Instead, the craft ceased approaching the station at a distance of 500 meters. Another attempt was made to dock the craft to the station on March 23, but the approach was again aborted due to a "catastrophic error." The Progress, after the second attempt, came within five to seven meters of a collision with Mir. The supply craft was left dormant in orbit as flight controllers studied the issue. Meanwhile, a backup Progress was prepared for launch to deliver needed supplies to the station in case M-7 failed to dock. Afanasyev and Manarov undocked in Soyuz TM-11 and flew around the station and manually redocked at Mir's aft port on March 26 to enable the Progress to use the forward port. During the approach to the aft port, the Soyuz followed a similar trajectory as the Progress and it was concluded that the problem was with Mir rather than the craft. Soyuz TM-11 then redocked manually. On March 28, Progress M-7 successfully docked to the forward port of Mir.

Afanasyev and Manarov performed the third and final spacewalk of the mission on April 25. During the three-hour-and-thirty-four-minute EVA, they filmed the damaged antenna on the Kvant module and re-installed the Kvant-2 camera they had removed during the first spacewalk.

=== Mission conclusion and landing ===
The crew of Mir EO-9 (Anatoly Artsebarsky and Sergei Krikalev), along with Briton Helen Sharman as part of Project Juno, arrived at the station aboard Soyuz TM-12 on May 20 to relieve the EO-8 crew. While aboard Mir, Sharman became the first Briton in space and completed a Soviet-designed research program.

Soyuz TM-11 undocked from the Mir space station for the final time on May 26, 1991, with Afanasyev, Manarov and Sharman aboard, leaving the crew of Mir EO-9 aboard the station. The trio landed in Kazakhstan at 10:03 UTC on May 26.

== See also ==
- List of Mir Expeditions
- Soyuz TM-11
