= British space programme =

Official efforts to develop space capabilities

- First flight: 27 June 1969 (Black Arrow)
- Successes: 2
- Failures: 2

The British space programme is the British government's work to develop British space capabilities. The objectives of the current civil programme are to "win sustainable economic growth, secure new scientific knowledge and provide benefits to all citizens."

The first official British space programme began in 1952. In 1959, the first satellite programme was started, with the Ariel series of British satellites, built in the United States and the UK and launched using American rockets. The first British satellite, Ariel 1, was launched in 1962. The British space programme has always emphasized uncrewed space research and commercial initiatives. It has never been government policy to create a British astronaut corps. The British government did not provide funding for the International Space Station until 2011.

During the 1960s and 1970s, a number of efforts were made to develop a British satellite launch capability. A British rocket named Black Arrow placed a single British satellite, Prospero, into orbit from a launch site in Australia in 1971. Prospero remains the only British satellite to be put into orbit using a British vehicle.

The British National Space Centre was established in 1985 to coordinate British government agencies and other interested bodies in the promotion of British participation in the international market for satellite launches, satellite construction and other space endeavours. In 2010, many of the various separate sources of space-related funding were combined and allocated to the centre's replacement, the UK Space Agency. Among other projects, the agency funded a single-stage-to-orbit spaceplane concept called Skylon, which did not progress beyond testing of engine components.

== Origins ==
Scientific interest in space travel existed in the United Kingdom prior to World War II, particularly amongst members of the British Interplanetary Society (founded in 1933) whose members included Sir Arthur C. Clarke, author and conceiver of the geostationary telecommunications satellite, who joined the BIS before World War II.

As with the other post-war space-faring nations, the British government's initial interest in space was primarily military. Early programmes reflected this interest. As with other nations, much of the rocketry knowledge was obtained from captured German scientists who were persuaded to work for the British. The British performed the earliest post-war tests of captured V-2 rockets in Operation Backfire, less than six months after the end of the war in Europe. In 1946 a proposal was made by Ralph A. Smith to fund a British crewed suborbital launch in a modified V-2 called Megaroc; this was, however, rejected by the government.

From 1957, British space astronomy used Skylark suborbital sounding rockets, launched from Woomera, Australia, which at first reached heights of 200 km (124 mi). Development of air-to-surface missiles such as Blue Steel contributed to progress towards launches of larger orbit-capable rockets.

== History ==
=== British satellite programmes (1959–present) ===
==== Early satellite programmes ====
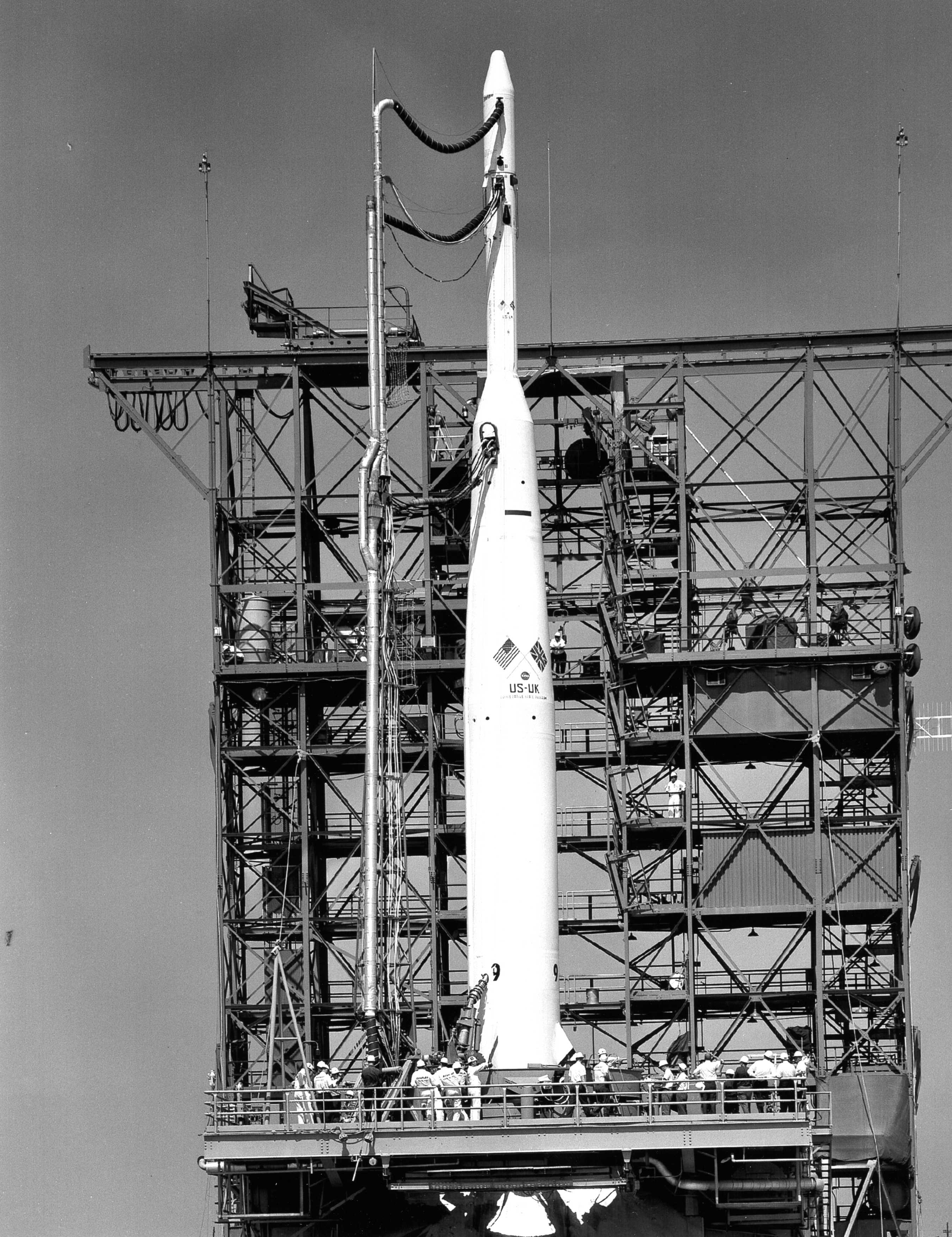
US Delta 9 rocket with Ariel 1, the first British satellite, 26 April 1962

The Ariel programme developed six satellites between 1962 and 1979, all of which were launched by NASA.

In 1971, the last Black Arrow (R3) launched Prospero X-3, the only British satellite to be launched using a British rocket, from Australia. Ground contact with Prospero ended in 1996.

==== Military communications satellite programme ====
Skynet is a purely military programme, operating a set of communications satellites on behalf of the Ministry of Defence (MoD), to provide communication services to the three branches of the British Armed Forces and to NATO and allied governments. The first satellite was launched in 1969, becoming the first military satellite in geostationary orbit, and the most recent in 2012. As of 2020, seven Skynet satellites are operating and providing coverage of almost the whole globe.

Skynet is the most expensive British space project, although as a military initiative it is not part of the civil space programme. The MoD is currently specifying the Skynet 6 architecture to replace the Skynet 5 model satellites, which is expected to cost about £6 billion.

==== Intelligence satellite programmes ====
Zircon was the codename for a British signals intelligence satellite, intended to be launched in 1988, but cancelled in 1987.

During the Cold War, the UK's Government Communications Headquarters (GCHQ) relied heavily on America's National Security Agency (NSA) for communications interception from space. GCHQ therefore decided to produce a British-designed-and-built signals intelligence satellite, to be named Zircon, a code-name derived from zirconium silicate, a diamond substitute. Zircon's function was to intercept radio and other signals from the USSR, Europe and other areas. The satellite was to be built by Marconi Space and Defence Systems at Portsmouth Airport, where a high-security building had been built.

It was to be launched on a NASA Space Shuttle under the guise of Skynet IV. Launch on the Shuttle would have entitled a British National to fly as a payload specialist, and a group of military pilots were presented to the press as candidates for 'Britain's first man in space'. Zircon was cancelled by Chancellor Nigel Lawson on cost grounds in 1987. The subsequent scandal about the true nature of the project became known as the Zircon affair.

==== Independent satellite navigation system ====
On 30 November 2018, it was announced that the United Kingdom Global Navigation Satellite System (UKGNSS) would not be affiliated with the European Space Agency's Galileo satellite system after Britain completed its withdrawal from the European Union. Instead, it was initially planned that the UK Space Agency would operate an independent satellite system. However, on 25 September 2020, The Daily Telegraph reported that the United Kingdom Global Navigation Satellite System project had been scrapped. The project, deemed unnecessary and too expensive, would be replaced with a new project exploring alternative ways to provide satellite navigation services.

==== OneWeb satellite constellation ====
In July 2020, the United Kingdom government and India's Bharti Enterprises jointly purchased the bankrupt OneWeb satellite company, with the UK paying £400 million (US$500 million) for a 45% stake and a golden share to give it control over future ownership. The UK government was considering whether the low Earth orbit OneWeb satellite constellation could in future provide a form of UKGNSS service in addition to its primary purpose of fast satellite broadband, and if it could be incorporated into the military Skynet 6 communications architecture. OneWeb satellites are manufactured by a joint venture including Airbus Defence and Space, who operate Skynet.

OneWeb commenced launches of the OneWeb satellite constellation, a network of more than 650 low Earth orbit satellites, in February 2019, and by March 2020, had launched 74 of the planned 648 satellites in the initial constellation. OneWeb's goal has been to provide internet services to "everyone, everywhere", delivering internet connections to rural and remote places as well as to a range of markets. The post-bankruptcy company leadership launched an additional 36 OneWeb satellites on 18 December 2020. OneWeb satellites are listed in the UK Registry of Outer Space Objects.

=== British space vehicles (1950–1985) ===
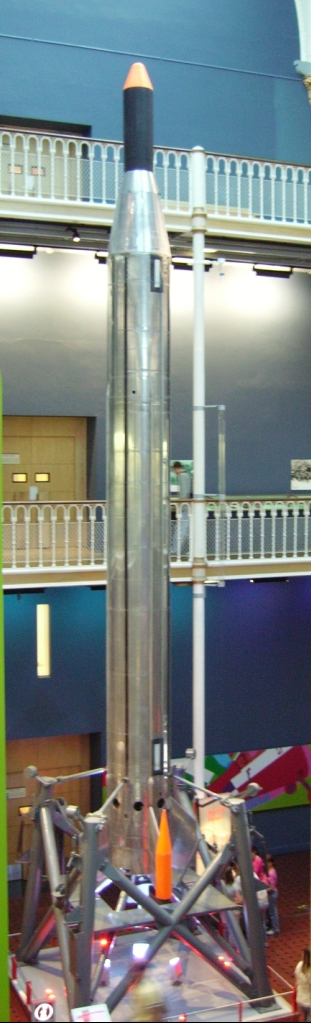
A Black Knight rocket on display in Edinburgh

Beginning in 1950, the UK developed and launched several space rockets, as well as developing space planes. These included the Black Knight and Blue Streak rockets. During this period, the launcher programmes were administered in succession by the Ministry of Supply, the Ministry of Aviation, the Ministry of Technology and the Department of Trade and Industry. Rockets were tested on the Isle of Wight, RAF Spadeadam, and Woomera in South Australia.

A major satellite launch vehicle was proposed in 1957 based on Blue Streak and Black Knight technology. This was named Black Prince, but the project was cancelled in 1960 due to lack of funding. Blue Streak rockets continued to be launched as the first stage of the European Europa carrier rocket until Europa's cancellation in 1972. The smaller Black Arrow launcher was developed from Black Knight and was first launched in 1969 from Woomera. The programme was soon cancelled. In 1971, the last Black Arrow (R3) launched Prospero X-3, becoming the first (and last) satellite to be placed in orbit by a British launch vehicle.

By 1972, British government funding of both Blue Streak and Black Arrow had ceased, and no further government-backed British space rockets were developed. Other space agencies, notably NASA, were used for subsequent launches of British satellites. Communication with the Prospero X-3 was terminated in 1996.

Falstaff, a British hypersonic test rocket, was launched from Woomera between 1969 and 1979.

In 1960 the British Space Development Company, a consortium of thirteen large industrial companies, was set up by Robert Renwick, 1st Baron Renwick to plan the world's first commercial communication satellite company, Renwick becoming the executive director. With Blue Streak, Britain had the technology to make it possible, but the idea was rejected by the British government on the grounds that such a system could not be envisaged in the next 20 years (1961–1981). The United States would eventually set up COMSAT in 1963, resulting in Intelsat, a large fleet of commercial satellites. The first of Intelsat's fleet, Intelsat I, was launched in April 1965.

The official national space programme was revived in 1982 when the British government funded the HOTOL project, an ambitious attempt at a re-usable space plane using air-breathing rocket engines designed by Alan Bond. Work was begun by British Aerospace. However, having classified the engine design as 'top secret' the government then ended funding for the project, terminating it.

=== National space programme (1985–2010) ===
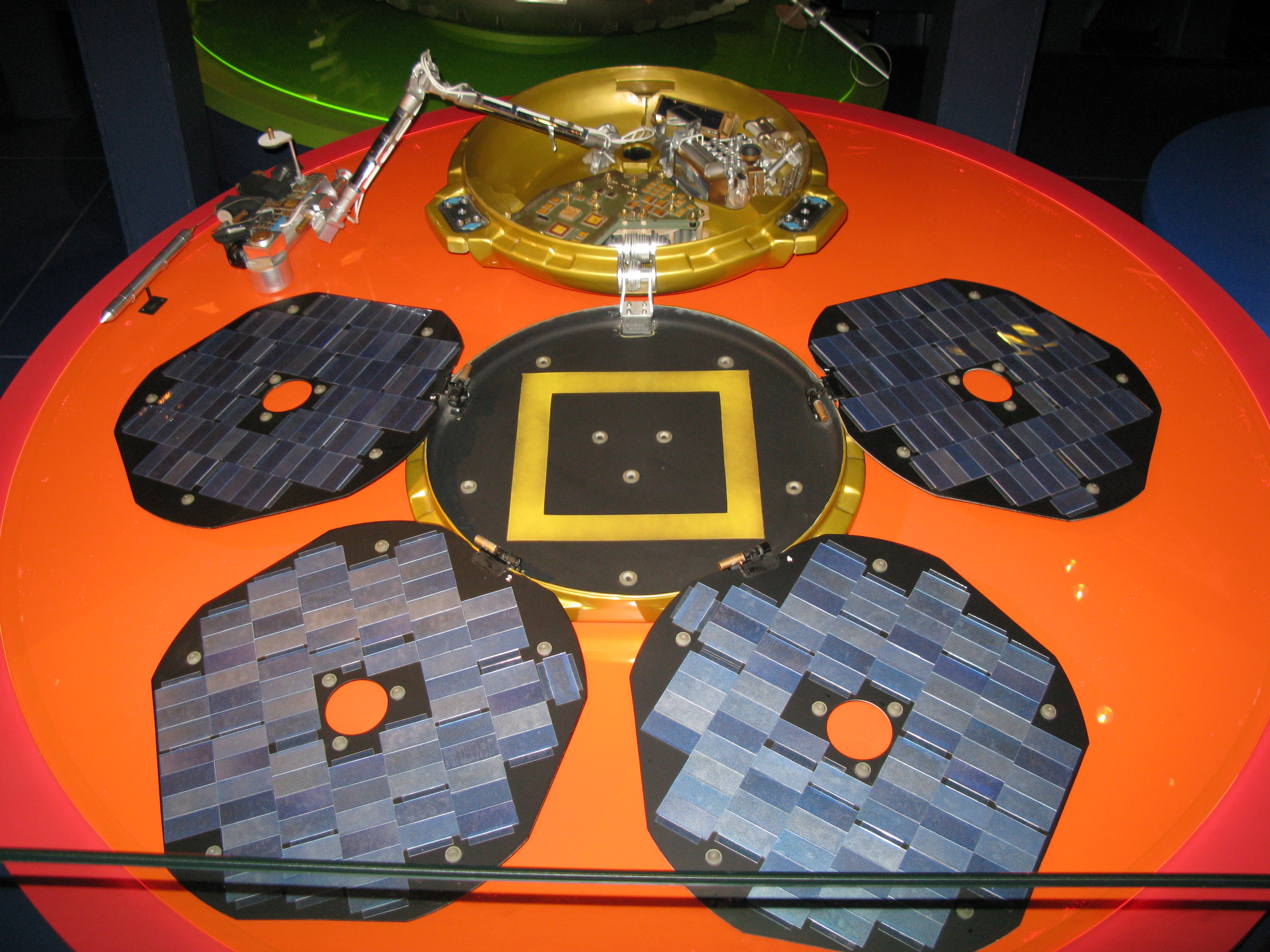
Beagle 2, a failed British Mars lander

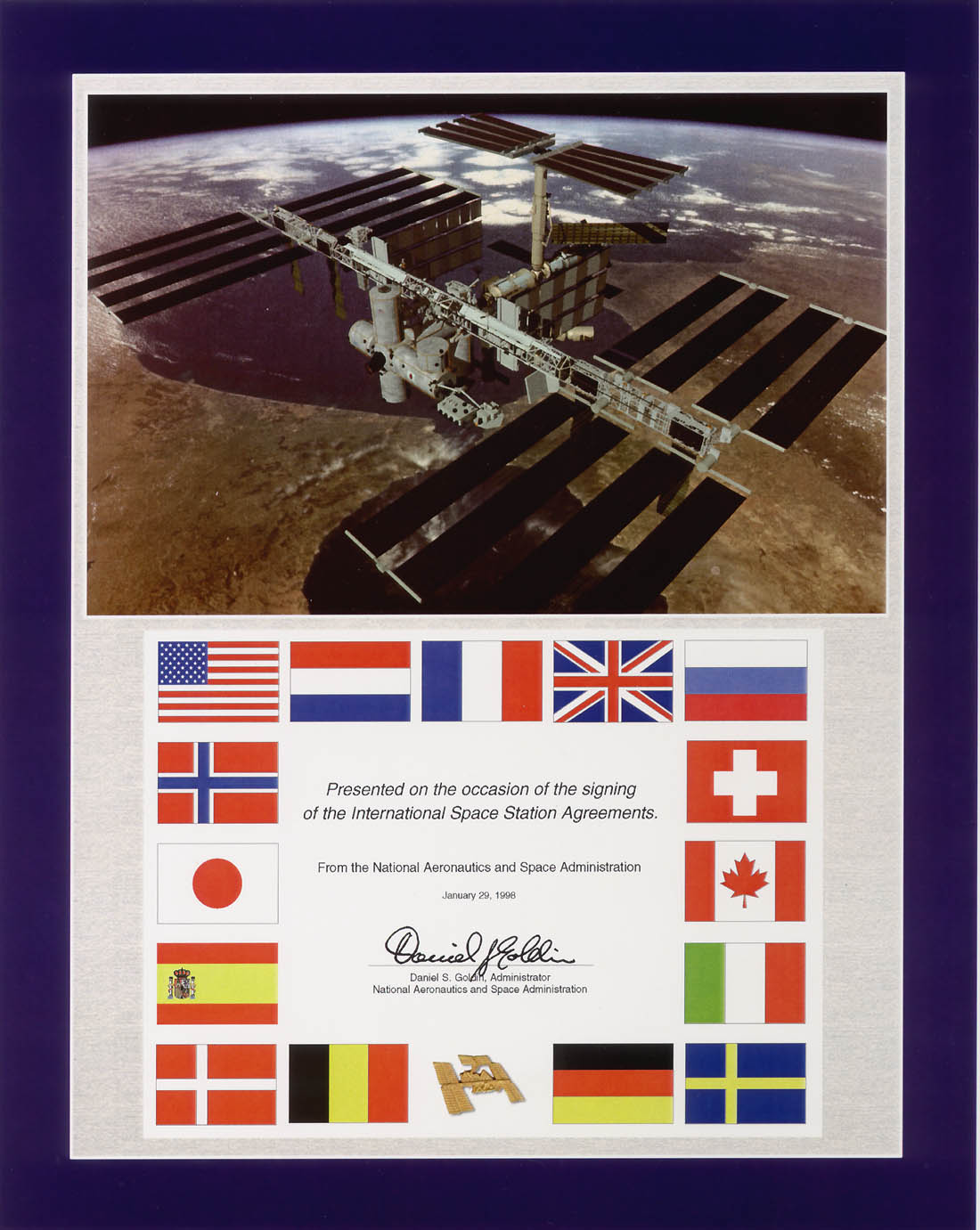
ISS agreements on 29 January 1998

In 1985, the British National Space Centre (BNSC) was formed to coordinate British space activities. The BNSC was a significant contributor to the general budget of the European Space Agency, and in 2005 paid 17.7% of the costs of the mandatory programmes, making it the second largest contributor. Through BNSC, the UK also took part in ESA's optional programmes such as Aurora, the robotic exploration initiative.

The UK decided not to contribute funds for the International Space Station, on the basis that it did not represent value for money. The British government did not take part in any crewed space endeavours during this period.

The United Kingdom continued to contribute scientific elements to satellite launches and space projects. The British probe Beagle 2, sent as part of the ESA's 2003 Mars Express mission to study the planet Mars, was lost when it failed to respond. The probe was found in 2015 by NASA's Mars Reconnaissance Orbiter and it has been concluded while it did land successfully, one of the solar arrays failed to deploy, blocking the communication antenna.

=== United Kingdom Space Agency (2010 – present) ===
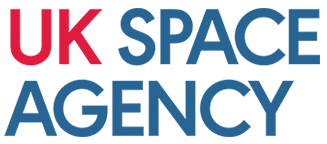
Logo of the UK Space Agency

On 1 April 2010, the government established the UK Space Agency, an agency responsible for the British space programme. It replaced the British National Space Centre and now has responsibility for government policy and key budgets for space, as well as representing the UK in all negotiations on space matters.

In 2015, the UK Space Agency provided 9.9% of the European Space Agency budget.

==== Reaction Engines Skylon ====
The British government partnered with the ESA in 2010 to promote a single-stage to orbit spaceplane concept called Skylon. This design was developed by Reaction Engines Limited, a company founded by Alan Bond after HOTOL was cancelled. The Skylon spaceplane was positively received by the British government, and the British Interplanetary Society. Successful tests of the engine pre-cooler and SABRE engine design were carried out in 2012, although full funding for development of the spacecraft itself had not been confirmed. Reaction Engines filed for bankruptcy in 2024.

==== 2011 budget boost and reforms ====
The British government proposed reform to the Outer Space Act 1986 in several areas, including the liabilities that cover space operations, in order to enable British companies' space endeavours to better compete with international competitors. There was also a proposal of a £10 million boost in capital investment, to be matched by industry.

==== Commercial spaceports ====
In July 2014, the government announced that it would build a British commercial spaceport. It planned to select a site, build the facilities, and have the spaceport in operation by 2018. Six sites were shortlisted, but the competition was ended in May 2016 with no selection made. However, in July 2018 UKSA announced that the UK government would back the development of a spaceport at A' Mhòine, in Sutherland, Scotland. Launch operations at Sutherland spaceport would be developed by Lockheed Martin with financial support from the UK government and Highlands and Islands Enterprise, originally with the aim of commencing operations in 2020, later delayed to 2022.

As of 2020, UKSA is supporting the development of three space launch sites in the UK. The proposed sites for spaceports, and the companies associated with them, are as follows:

- SaxaVord Spaceport – Unst, Shetland Islands
  - Lockheed Martin / ABL Space Systems
  - Rocket Factory Augsburg
- Space Hub Sutherland – Sutherland, Scotland
  - Skyrora
  - Orbex, which ceased operations in 2026
- Spaceport Cornwall – Newquay Airport, Cornwall, England
  - Virgin Orbit, which ceased operations in 2023

==== Space Industry Act 2018 ====
In June 2017, the government introduced a bill leading to the Space Industry Act 2018 which created a regulatory framework for the expansion of commercial space activities. This covered the development of British spaceports, for both orbital and sub-orbital activities, and launches and other activities overseas by UK entities.

== Commercial and private space activities ==
The first Briton in space, cosmonaut-researcher Helen Sharman, was funded by a private consortium without British government assistance whilst the government of the Soviet Union made up for the shortfall in the private funding. Interest in space continues in the UK's private sector, including satellite design and manufacture, developing designs for space planes and catering to the new market in space tourism.

=== Project Juno ===
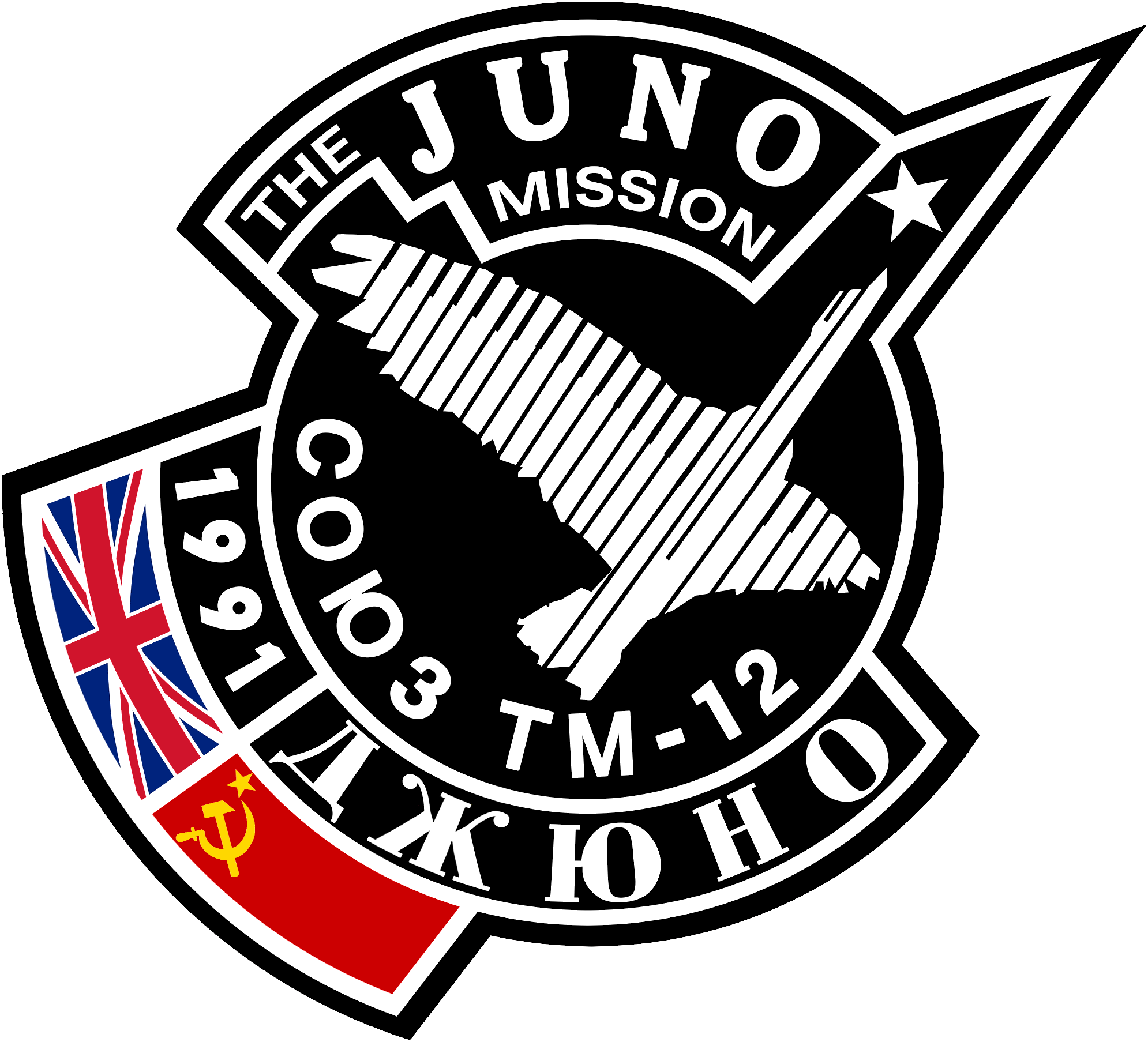
Mission patch for Project Juno, Soyuz TM-12

Project Juno was a privately funded campaign, which selected Helen Sharman to be the first Briton in space. A private consortium was formed to raise money to pay the USSR for a seat on a Soyuz mission to the Mir space station. The USSR had recently flown Toyohiro Akiyama, a Japanese journalist, by a similar arrangement.

A call for applicants was publicised in the UK resulting in the selection of four astronauts: Helen Sharman, Major Timothy Mace, Clive Smith and Surgeon Lieutenant Commander Gordon Brooks. Sharman was eventually chosen for the first of what was hoped to be a number of flights with Major Timothy Mace as her backup. The cost of the flight was to be funded by various innovative schemes, including sponsoring by private British companies and a lottery system. Corporate sponsors included British Aerospace, Memorex, and Interflora, and television rights were sold to ITV.

Ultimately the Juno consortium failed to raise the entire sum and the USSR considered canceling the mission. It is believed that Mikhail Gorbachev directed the mission to proceed at Soviet cost.

Sharman was launched aboard Soyuz TM-12 on 18 May 1991, and returned aboard Soyuz TM-11 on 26 May 1991.

=== Surrey Satellite Technology ===
Surrey Satellite Technology Ltd (SSTL) is a large spin-off company of the University of Surrey, now fully owned by Airbus Defence & Space, that builds and operates small satellites. SSTL works with the UK Space Agency and takes on a number of tasks for the UKSA that would be done in-house by a traditional large government space agency.

=== Virgin Galactic ===
Virgin Galactic, a US company within the British-based Virgin Group owned by Sir Richard Branson, is taking reservations for suborbital space flights from the general public. Its operations will use SpaceShipTwo space planes designed by Scaled Composites, which has previously developed the Ansari X-Prize winning SpaceShipOne.

=== Blue Origin ===
A private aerospace company owned by Jeff Bezos has multiple plans for space. On J 4 June 2022, on its fifth flight, Blue Origin NS-21, Hamish Harding became the eighth British astronaut (reaching an apogee of 107 km) to reach space. On 4 August 2022, on its sixth flight, Blue Origin NS-22, Vanessa O'Brien became the ninth British astronaut and second female British astronaut (reaching an apogee of 107 km) to reach space, while conducting an overview study on the human brain.

== British contribution to other space programmes ==
Communication and tracking of rockets and satellites in orbit is achieved using stations such as Jodrell Bank. During the Space Race, Jodrell Bank and other stations were used to track several satellites and probes including Sputnik and Pioneer 5.

As well as providing tracking facilities for other nations, scientists from the United Kingdom have participated in other nation's space programmes, notably contributing to the development of NASA's early space programmes, and co-operation with Australian launches.

The Royal Aircraft Establishment at Farnborough, invented carbon fibre composite material. The Saunders-Roe SR.53 Rocket/jet plane in 1957 used the newly invented silver peroxide catalyst rocket engine.

The concept of the communications satellite was invented by Arthur C. Clarke.

== British astronauts ==
Because the British government has never developed a crewed spaceflight programme and initially did not contribute funding to the crewed space flight part of ESA's activities, the first six British astronauts launched with either the American or Soviet/Russian space programmes. Despite this, on 9 October 2008, British Science and Innovation Minister Lord Drayson spoke favourably of the idea of a British astronaut. Army Air Corps test pilot Tim Peake became a member of the European Astronaut Corps in 2009, and then in 2015 the first astronaut funded by the British government when he reached the International Space Station aboard a Soyuz rocket launched from Baikonur in Kazakhstan.

To date, seven UK-born British citizens and two non-UK-born British citizen have flown in space:

Name	Birthplace	Missions	First launch date	Nationality/ies
Helen Sharman	Grenoside, Sheffield, South Yorkshire	Soyuz TM-12/11	18 May 1991	(United Kingdom)
Helen Sharman	First British astronaut (and in particular, the first British cosmonaut) as well as the first woman to visit the Mir space station. Funded partially by private British citizens as Project Juno and by the Soviet Union.			
Michael Foale	Louth, Lincolnshire	STS-45 (Atlantis); STS-56 (Discovery); STS-63 (Discovery); STS-84/86 (Atlantis); STS-103 (Discovery); Soyuz TMA-3	24 March 1992	(United Kingdom) / (United States)
Michael Foale	NASA astronaut. Born and grew up in the UK with dual UK/US citizenship, his mother being American. First British spacewalker. First Briton to both Mir and International Space Station.			
Mark Shuttleworth	Welkom, Orange Free State, South Africa	Soyuz TM-34/33	27 April 2002	(United Kingdom) / (South Africa)
Mark Shuttleworth	Self-funded space tourist to the International Space Station. Born a South African, he also holds British citizenship.			
Piers Sellers	Crowborough, Sussex	STS-112 (Atlantis); STS-121 (Discovery); STS-132 (Atlantis)	7 October 2002	(United Kingdom) / (United States)
Piers Sellers	NASA astronaut. Born and grew up in the UK, US citizen after 1991.			
Nicholas Patrick	Saltburn-by-the-Sea, North Yorkshire	STS-116 (Discovery); STS-130 (Endeavour)	9 December 2006	(United Kingdom) / (United States)
Nicholas Patrick	NASA astronaut. Born and grew up in the UK, US citizen since 1994.			
Richard Garriott	Cambridge, Cambridgeshire	Soyuz TMA-13/12	12 October 2008	(United Kingdom) / (United States)
Richard Garriott	Self-funded space tourist to the International Space Station. Born in the UK to American parents (son of Skylab astronaut Owen Garriott).			
Timothy Peake	Chichester, West Sussex	Soyuz TMA-19M	15 December 2015	(United Kingdom)
Timothy Peake	ESA astronaut. First British government-funded Briton in space and aboard the International Space Station.			
Hamish Harding	Hammersmith, London, United Kingdom	Blue Origin NS-21	4 June 2022	(United Kingdom) / (United Arab Emirates)
Hamish Harding	Self-funded, space flight participant. Flew on Blue Origin NS-21 on June 4, 2022.			
Vanessa O'Brien	Michigan, USA	Blue Origin NS-22	4 August 2022	(United Kingdom) / (United States)
Vanessa O'Brien	Flew on Blue Origin NS-22 on August 4, 2022. Funding offset to conduct overview effect research study on the human brain. Emigrated to United Kingdom in 1999.			

=== Potential astronauts ===
US Air Force Colonel Gregory H. Johnson served as pilot on two Endeavour missions (STS-123 and STS-134). Although born in the UK while his father was stationed at a US Air Force base, he has never been a British citizen and is not otherwise associated with the UK. He is sometimes incorrectly listed as a British astronaut. (Note: The BBC reference does not mention his father's US Air Force connection, and includes the astronaut under 'Britons' in space.)

Anthony Llewellyn (born in Cardiff, Wales) was selected as a scientist-astronaut by NASA during August 1967 but resigned during September 1968, having never flown in space.

Army Lieutenants-Colonel Anthony Boyle (born in Kidderminster) and Richard Farrimond (born in Birkenhead, Cheshire), MoD employee Christopher Holmes (born in London), Royal Navy Commander Peter Longhurst (born in Staines, Middlesex) and RAF Squadron Leader Nigel Wood (born in York) were selected in February 1984 as payload specialists for the Skynet 4 programme, intended for launch using the Space Shuttle. Boyle resigned from the programme in July 1984 due to Army commitments. Prior to the cancellation of the missions after the Challenger disaster, Wood was due to fly aboard Shuttle mission STS-61-H in 1986 (with Farrimond serving as his back-up) and Longhurst was due to fly aboard Shuttle mission STS-71-C in 1987 (with Holmes serving as back-up). All resigned abruptly in 1986, citing fears and safety concerns post-Challenger.

Army Air Corps Major Timothy Mace (born in Catterick, Yorkshire) served as back-up to Helen Sharman for the Soyuz TM-12 / Project Juno mission in 1991. He resigned in 1991, having not flown. Clive Smith and Royal Navy Surgeon Lieutenant Commander Gordon Brooks also served for a year as back-up astronauts for the Juno flight, learning Russian and preparing the scientific programme. Sharman, Mace and Brooks were subsequently put forward by the BNSC for the European Space Corps.

Former RAF pilot David Mackay was appointed as Chief Pilot by Virgin Galactic in 2009, and is participating in the flight test programme of the suborbital spaceplane SpaceShipTwo.

Singer/songwriter and actress Sarah Brightman announced on 10 October 2012 her intention to purchase a Soyuz seat to the International Space Station as a self-funded space tourist in partnership with Space Adventures. She underwent cosmonaut training with the aim of flying on Soyuz TMA-18M, but stated on 13 May 2015 that she was withdrawing "for family reasons". It is not known whether she intends to fly at a later date.

On 1 July 2021 Virgin Galactic announced that Richard Branson (its founder) and Colin Bennet (the Lead Operations Engineer) would fly as part of the crew to space on VSS Unity. Subject to the definition of space (as VSS Unity reaches above 80 km, the US government definition of space, but does not typically reach the Karman line) this would make them the UK's 8th and 9th astronauts.

The 2022 European Space Agency Astronaut Group includes three British citizens as candidates – Rosemary Coogan (career), Meganne Christian (reserve), and John McFall (parastronaut).

== In fiction ==
Notable fictional depictions of British spacecraft or Britons in space include:

- "The First Men in the Moon" by H.G.Wells (The Strand Magazine Originally Serialized December 1900 to August 1901 and published in hardcover in 1901).
- "How We Went to Mars" by Sir Arthur C. Clarke (Amateur Science Fiction Stories March 1938).
- Dan Dare, Pilot of the Future (comics, 1950–1967, 1980s).
- Journey into Space (radio, 1953–1955).
- The Quatermass Experiment (television, 1953).
- Blast Off at Woomera by Hugh Walters (1957).
- Doctor Who (television) – "The Ambassadors of Death" (1970), "The Christmas Invasion" (2005), "The Waters of Mars" (2009).
- The Goodies - "Invasion of the Moon Creatures" (television, 1973).
- Moonbase 3 (television, 1973).
- Come Back Mrs. Noah (television, 1977).
- Moonraker (1979).
- Lifeforce (1985).
- Star Cops (television, 1987).
- Red Dwarf (television, 1988–1999, 2009).
- A Grand Day Out with Wallace and Gromit (short stop-motion film, 1989)
- Ministry of Space (comics, 2001–2004).
- Space Cadets (TV series) (television, 2005).
- Hyperdrive (TV series) (television, 2006–2007).
- "Capsule" Sci Fi Movie (2015).
- "Peppa Pig"— "Grampy Rabbit in Space" Cartoon (2012).

== See also ==
- John Hodge (engineer) – British-born aerospace engineer who worked for NASA
- National Space Centre – visitor centre in Leicester
- United Kingdom Space Command – military space command established in 2021
