= Project Juno =

Private British space programme

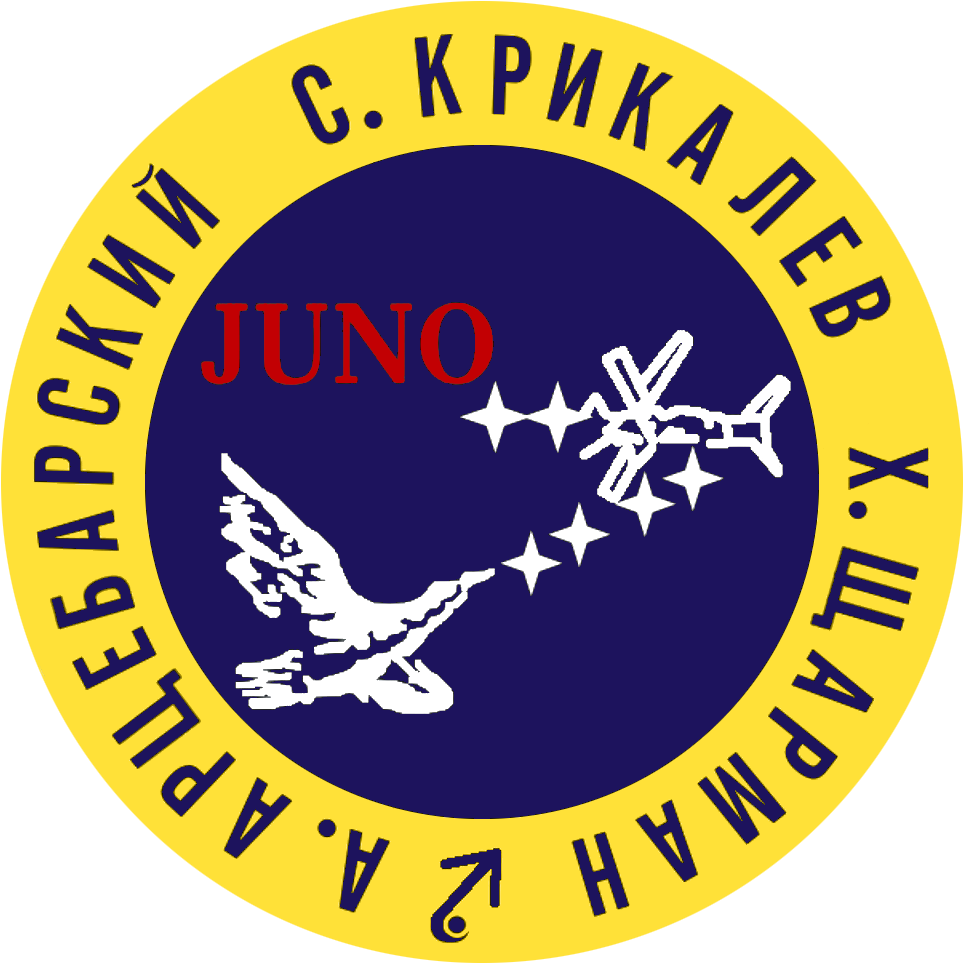
Mission patch for Project Juno.

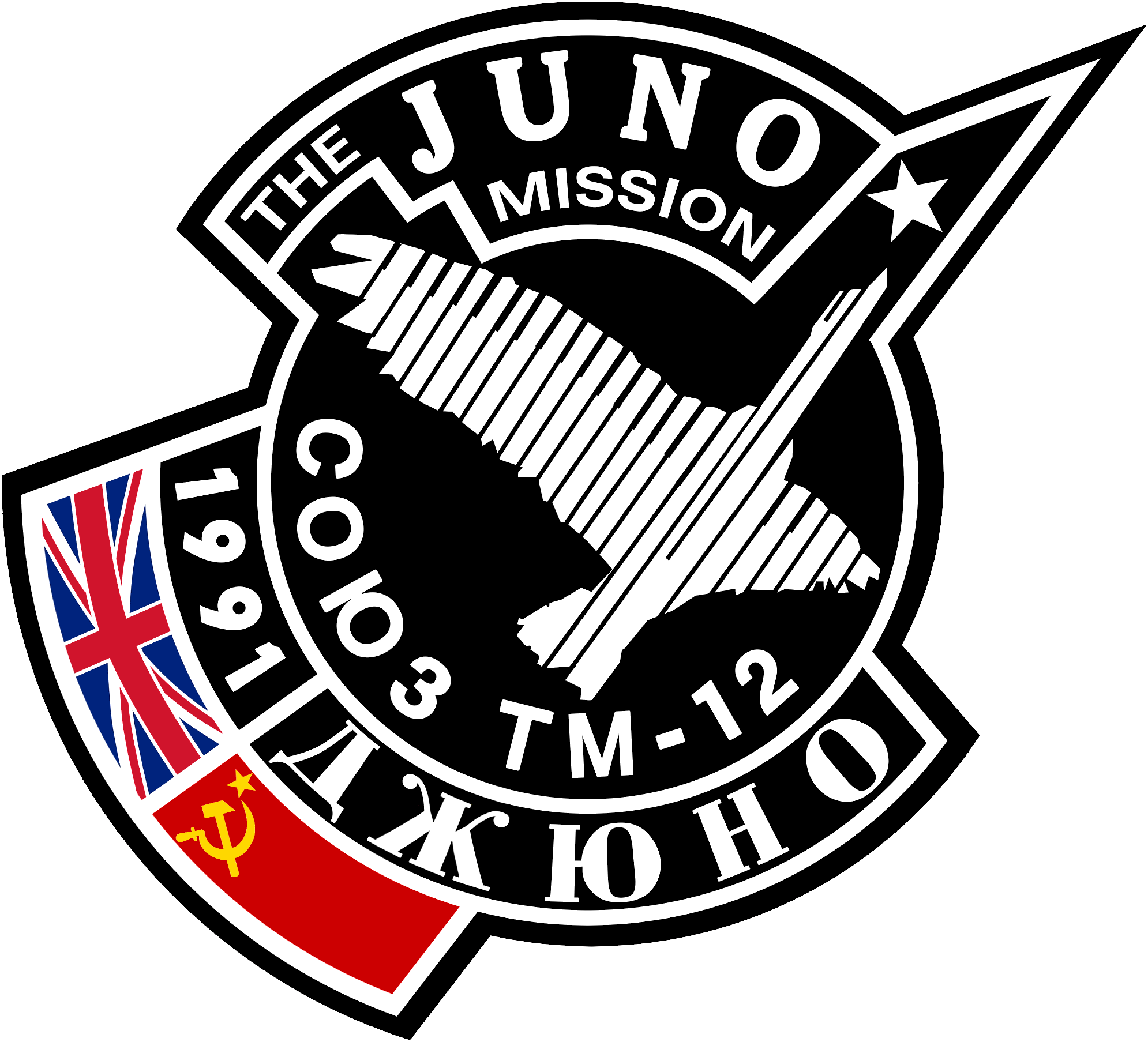
Mission patch for Project Juno.

Project Juno was a privately funded campaign which selected Helen Sharman to be the first Briton in space.

As the United Kingdom did not, at that time, have a human spaceflight programme (until the UK joined the human spaceflight elements of ESA's exploration programme in December 2012, which led to Tim Peake's ESA mission in 2015), a private consortium was formed to raise money to pay the Soviet Union for a seat on a Soyuz mission to the Mir space station. The Soviet Union had recently flown Toyohiro Akiyama, a Japanese journalist, under a similar arrangement.

== Selection ==
A call for applicants was publicized in the UK (one ad read "Astronaut wanted. No experience necessary"), leading to 13,000 applications. Juno selected four candidates to train in the Soviet Union:

- Gordon Brooks (Royal Navy physician, then 33)
- Major Timothy Mace (Army Air Corps, 33)
- Clive Smith (Kingston University lecturer, 27)
- Helen Sharman (food technologist, 26)

The training process was documented in a Scottish Television documentary, 'Mission Juno', broadcast on 28th December 1989. Eventually Mace and Sharman were selected to continue full-time training at Star City. After learning Russian and familiarising themselves with the science programme, Smith and Brooks were employed to teach the other two how to perform the experiments and then to conduct them in a life sized mock up of Mir for live media during the mission.

== Funding ==
The cost of the flight was to be funded by various innovative schemes, including sponsoring by private British companies and a lottery system. Corporate sponsors included British Aerospace, Memorex, and Interflora, and television rights were sold to ITV.

The flight cost £7 million.

Ultimately the Juno consortium failed to raise the entire sum, and the Soviet Union considered cancelling the mission. However Mikhail Gorbachev directed the mission to proceed at Soviet cost. The ambitious microgravity experiments originally planned were dropped when time ran out for sending required equipment on an automated 'Progress' flight. Helen did perform experiments designed by British schools that could be done with existing equipment aboard Mir along with a British microbiology screening investigation taken over by the Russians.

== Flight and after ==
Sharman was launched aboard Soyuz TM-12 on 18 May 1991, and returned aboard Soyuz TM-11 on 26 May 1991.

Both Sharman and Mace were candidates but not selected in the 1992 and 1998 European Space Agency selection rounds for its astronaut corps. Brooks was also put forward for the European Astronaut Corps in 1982, but dropped out when employed on AI systems elsewhere. Mace did not fly in space, but married the daughter of cosmonaut Vitali Zholobov. He was later the helicopter pilot for President of South Africa Nelson Mandela. He died in September 2014 from cancer.

== See also ==
- British National Space Centre
- British space programme
- British astronauts
