= Progress M-7 =

1991 Soviet uncrewed cargo spacecraft

- Mission type: Mir resupply
- COSPAR ID: 1991-020A
- SATCAT no.: 21188

Spacecraft properties
- Spacecraft type: Progress-M 11F615A55
- Manufacturer: NPO Energia
- Launch mass: 7,250 kilograms (15,980 lb)

Start of mission
- Launch date: 19 March 1991, 13:05:15 UTC
- Rocket: Soyuz-U2
- Launch site: Baikonur Site 1/5

End of mission
- Disposal: Deorbited
- Decay date: 7 May 1991

Orbital parameters
- Reference system: Geocentric
- Regime: Low Earth
- Perigee altitude: 365 kilometres (227 mi)
- Apogee altitude: 388 kilometres (241 mi)
- Inclination: 51.6 degrees

Docking with Mir
- Docking port: Core Forward
- Docking date: 28 March 1991, 12:02:28 UTC
- Undocking date: 6 May 1991, 22:59:36 UTC
- Time docked: 39 days

Progress M-7 (Russian: Прогресс М-7) was a Soviet uncrewed cargo spacecraft which was launched in 1991 to resupply the Mir space station. The twenty-fifth of sixty four Progress spacecraft to visit Mir, it used the Progress-M 11F615A55 configuration, and had the serial number 208. It carried supplies including food, water and oxygen for the EO-8 crew aboard Mir, as well as equipment for conducting scientific research, and fuel for adjusting the station's orbit and performing manoeuvres. It also carried the second VBK-Raduga capsule, intended to return equipment and experiment results to Earth.

Progress M-7 was launched at 13:05:15 GMT on 19 March 1991, atop a Soyuz-U2 carrier rocket flying from Site 1/5 at the Baikonur Cosmodrome. It took three attempts to dock with Mir; the first of which occurred at 14:28 GMT on 21 March, and resulted in Progress M-7 approaching to within 500 metres (1,600 ft) of Mir, before the attempt was aborted. During a second attempt on 23 March, approach was aborted when the spacecraft was 50 metres (160 ft) from Mir; however, it passed within 5 metres (16 ft) before moving away to a holding position whilst the problem was investigated. The first two attempts had used the aft docking port of the Kvant-1 module; however, it was decided to use the forward port of the core module for the next one. At 10:12:00 GMT on 26 March, the Soyuz TM-11 spacecraft which had been occupying this port undocked from it, before flying around the station and docking with Kvant-1 at 10:58:59. Progress M-7 successfully docked with Mir at 12:02:28 GMT on 28 March.

During the 39 days for which Progress M-7 was docked, Mir was in an orbit of around 365 by 388 kilometres (197 by 210 nmi), inclined at 51.6 degrees. Progress M-7 undocked from Mir at 22:59:36 GMT on 6 May, and was deorbited at 16:24:00 the next day, to a destructive reentry over the Pacific Ocean. Its Raduga capsule, which had been deployed following the deorbit burn, came down in the Russian Soviet Federative Socialist Republic at around 17:20 GMT; however, efforts to recover it were unsuccessful.

== See also ==
- 1991 in spaceflight
- List of Progress flights
- List of uncrewed spaceflights to Mir
