= Anthony Boyle (disambiguation) =

Anthony Boyle may refer to:

- Anthony Boyle (born 1994), Northern Irish actor
- Anthony Boyle (British Army officer), astronaut candidate in the British space programme
