= Falstaff (disambiguation) =

Falstaff is a Shakespearean character in the Henry IV plays and in The Merry Wives of Windsor.

Falstaff or Fallstaff may also refer to:

== Music ==
=== Opera ===
- Falstaff (Balfe), an opera by Michael William Balfe
- Falstaff (Salieri) an opera by Antonio Salieri
- Falstaff (opera), an opera by Giuseppe Verdi

=== Other music ===
- Falstaff (Elgar), a symphonic study by Edward Elgar

== Other uses ==
- Falstaff (rocket), a British hypersonic research rocket
- Fallstaff, Baltimore, Maryland, a neighborhood in the United States
- Falstaff Beer, a brand of American beer
  - Falstaff Brewing Corporation
- Chimes at Midnight or Falstaff, a film by Orson Welles
- Falstaff, an apple cultivar
- Falstaff, a crater on the Uranian moon Oberon
- Falstaff, a 1976 novel by Robert Nye
- Falstaff Openshaw, a character from The Fred Allen Show played by Alan Reed
- Falstaff, the pen name of Vincenzo Buonassisi

== See also ==
- "Falstaff, fakir", a pseudonym of Swedish author Axel Wallengren
