= TopSat =

British Earth observation satellite

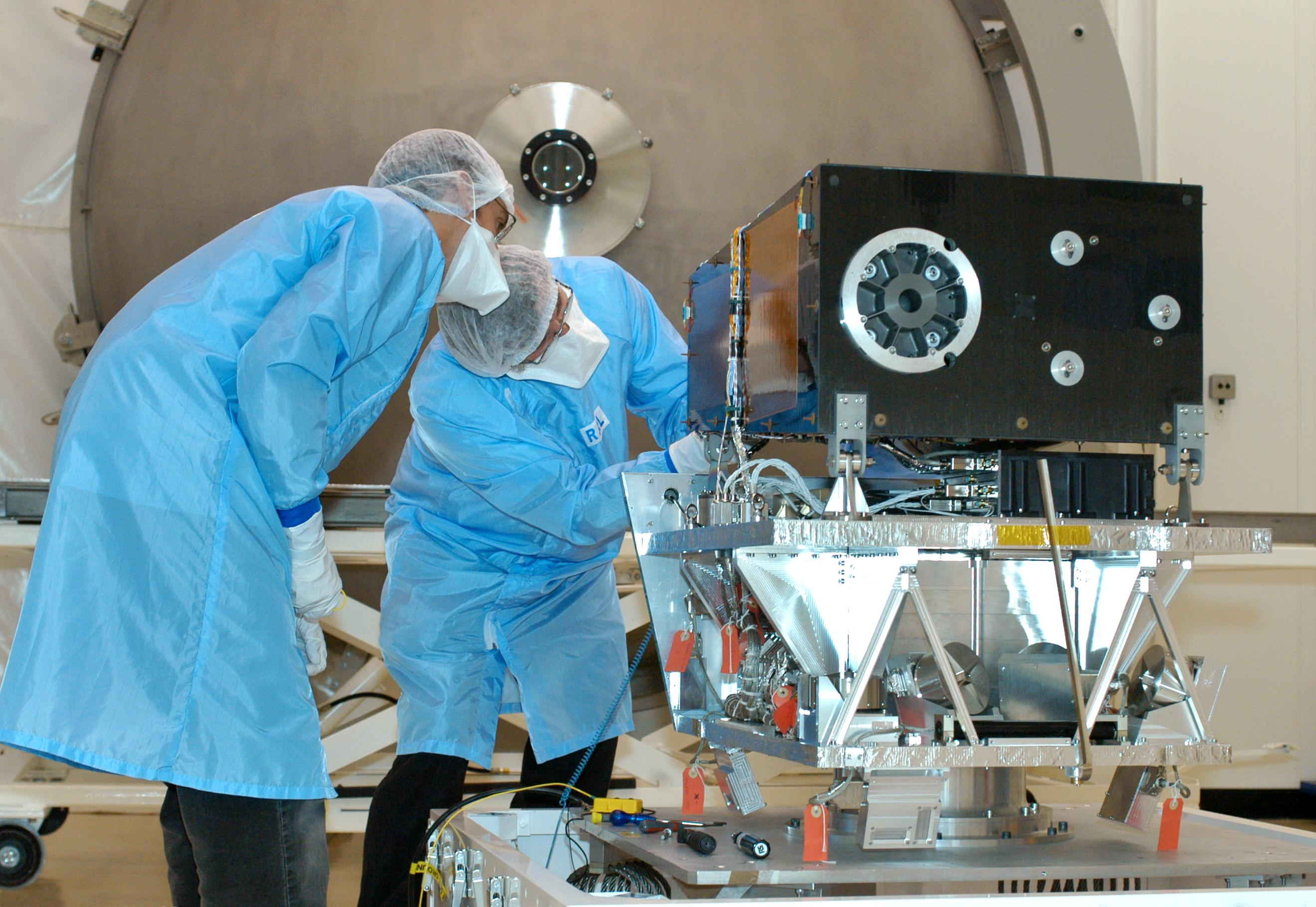
- The TopSat being made
- Mission type: Optical imaging
- COSPAR ID: 2005-043B
- SATCAT no.: 28891

Spacecraft properties
- Manufacturer: SSTL

Start of mission
- Launch date: 27 October 2005, 06:52:26 UTC
- Rocket: Kosmos-3M
- Launch site: Plesetsk 132/1

Orbital parameters
- Reference system: Geocentric
- Regime: Sun-synchronous
- Perigee altitude: 682 kilometres (424 mi)
- Apogee altitude: 707 kilometres (439 mi)
- Inclination: 98.18 degrees
- Period: 98.65 minutes
- Epoch: 3 November 2005

TopSat (Tactical Operational Satellite, also known as TopSat 1 and TacSat 0) is a British Earth observation satellite, currently in Low Earth Orbit. The nanosatellite was launched in October 2005 alongside the Beijing-1 Disaster Monitoring Constellation satellite by a Cosmos rocket from Plesetsk Cosmodrome in Russia.

== Mission ==
TopSat carries out imaging with a ground resolution of 2.5 m. Much smaller and cheaper than other imaging satellites of similar high resolution, TopSat has been used to demonstrate the feasibility of providing images on demand to portable ground stations, such as that which might be deployed by the military or another disaster relief organisation.

TopSat was built in the United Kingdom by Surrey Satellite Technology Ltd, QinetiQ and The Rutherford Appleton Laboratory under the British National Space Centre Mosaic programme. The engineering model of TopSat now lives in the space gallery of London's Science Museum.

TopSat won the 2006 Popular Science "Best of What's New" Grand Award in the Aviation and Space category.
