= Toyohiro Akiyama =

Japanese television journalist and cosmonaut (1942–2026)

- 秋山豊寛
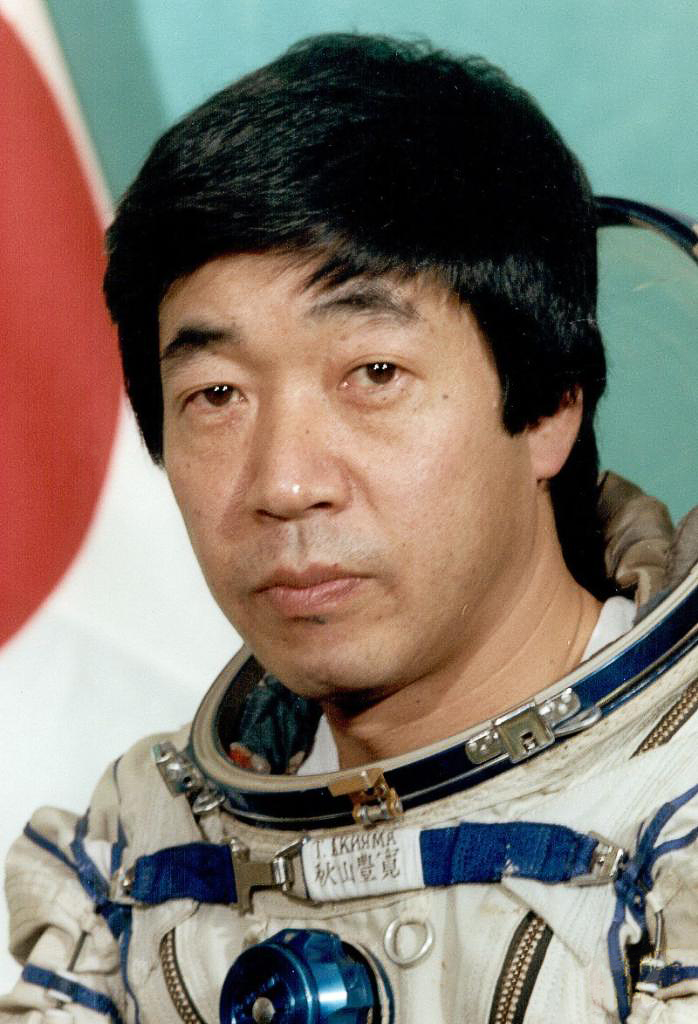
- Akiyama in 1990
- Born: 22 July 1942; Tokyo, Japan
- Died: 26 August 2026 (aged 84); Ōdai, Mie Prefecture, Japan
- Other names: Space journalist Space antihero
- Education: International Christian University (BS, 1966?)
- Occupations: Journalist (TBS), professor at Kyoto University of Art and Design
- Awards: Order of Friendship of Peoples; Medal "For Merit in Space Exploration"
- Space career

TBS Research Cosmonaut
- Time in space: 7d 21h 54min 40sec
- Selection: Soyuz TM-11 mission
- Mission: Soyuz TM-11, Soyuz TM-10
- Spouse: Kyoko Akiyama (m. 1970; div. 1995)
- Children: 2

Signature
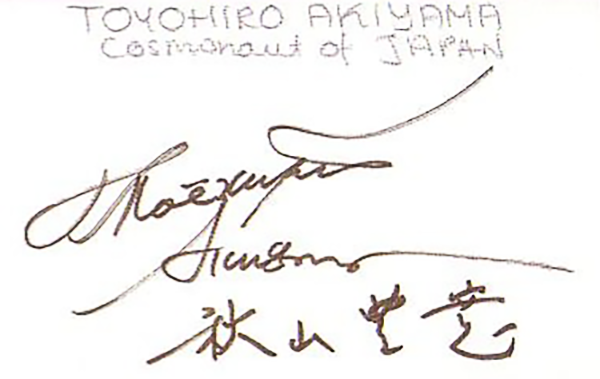

Toyohiro Akiyama (秋山 豊寛, Akiyama Toyohiro; 22 July 1942 – 26 August 2026) was a Japanese television journalist and academic who was a professor at Kyoto University of Art and Design. In December 1990, he spent seven days aboard the Mir space station. He became the first person of Japanese nationality to fly in space, and his space mission was the second spaceflight to be commercially sponsored and funded. Akiyama was also the first civilian to fly aboard a commercial space flight and the first journalist to report from outer space.

== Education and career ==
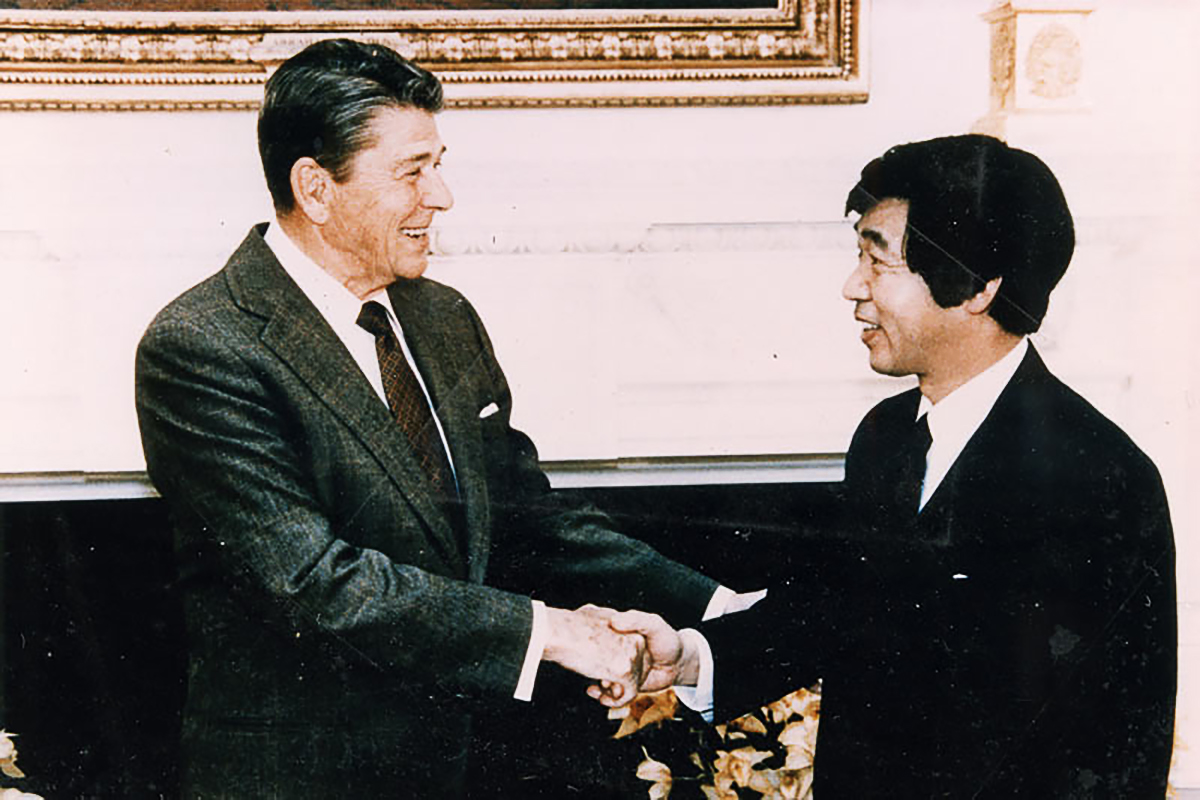
Akiyama interview with President Reagan as TBS chief correspondent (29 April 1985)

Toyohiro Akiyama was born on 22 July 1942 in Tokyo.

Akiyama attended and earned his bachelor's degree at the International Christian University located in Mitaka, Tokyo. He then joined the Tokyo Broadcasting System (TBS) as a journalist in 1966. He worked for the BBC World Service from 1967 to 1971 before becoming a correspondent for the TBS Division of Foreign News. From 1984 to 1988, he served as TBS chief correspondent in Washington, D.C.

== Space training ==
On 17 August 1989, Akiyama was selected for a commercial Soviet-Japanese flight. The flight was sponsored by the TBS Corporation to celebrate its fortieth anniversary. The amount that the corporation paid for the flight of its employee differs significantly from one source to another (US$28 million, US$25 million, 5 billion yen or US$37 million). Akiyama started training at the Yuri Gagarin Cosmonaut Training Center in October 1989.

== Spaceflight ==
TBS wanted to send the first Japanese person to space in order to boost their TV ratings. 163 TBS employees applied for the opportunity to fly to space. Eventually, Akiyama and camerawoman Ryoko Kikuchi were selected as the two final candidates. When Kikuchi developed a case of appendicitis a week before launch, Akiyama was selected for cosmonaut training and he was the primary crew member, with no backup in place. Akiyama began cosmonaut training in August 1989 in a deal between TBS and the Soviet Union. The commercialization of space flight was evident by the Soyuz TM-11 covered with advertising of TBS and other Japanese companies.

Akiyama's mission marked the first flight of a person of Japanese nationality in space as well as the first commercially sponsored and funded spaceflight of an individual in history. Akiyama also became the first journalist to give live reports from space. After successfully completing a Research Cosmonaut training course at the Yuri Gagarin Cosmonaut Training Center in present-day Russia, Akiyama launched aboard the Soyuz TM-11 mission to the Mir space station on 2 December 1990 along with mission commander Viktor Afanasyev and flight engineer Musa Manarov.

Akiyama was not a trained astronaut, scientist nor engineer. During his time aboard Mir, Akiyama gave live reports each day documenting life aboard the station, but his apparent discomfort led to him being described as the first "antihero in space". He described his struggles such as space sickness and craving for cigarettes: During training, he quit smoking cigarettes, having previously smoked four packs a day. Before liftoff, when asked what he looked forward to most upon his return to Earth, he said "I can't wait to have a smoke". His fellow cosmonauts later reported, in regards to his nausea, that they "hadn't ever seen a man vomit that much".

Initially, the TBS television viewership was high, but by midweek, it declined slightly above normal. Various reports have cited a flight cost paid by TBS as between US$12 million and US$37 million. The company reportedly lost US$7.4 million on the deal. Akiyama eventually returned to Earth just over a week later aboard Soyuz TM-10 along with Gennadi Manakov and Gennadi Strekalov on 10 December. While onboard the space station, Akiyama made nightly live broadcasts.

== Later career ==
Akiyama returned to TBS after completing his spaceflight and became deputy director of the TBS News Division. He retired from TBS in 1995, because he disagreed with the active commercialization of television.

In April 1991, he shot a film, with a group of Japanese journalists, about the state of the Aral Sea in Kazakhstan.

From January 1996, he engaged in organic farming with rice and mushrooms in the Abukuma mountains in the town Takine, near Tamura, Fukushima. He also wrote books and gave lectures focusing on environmental issues. In March 2011, he was personally affected by the Fukushima disaster and was forced to abandon his farm.

On 1 November 2011, he became a professor of agriculture at the Faculty of Arts, Kyoto University of Art and Design. He worked as a professor until 2023.

== Personal life and death ==
Akiyama married Kyoko Akiyama in 1970, and the couple had a son and a daughter. He left his family in Tokyo to go farm. They divorced in 1995.

Akiyama died of gastrointestinal bleeding on 26 August 2026, at the age of 84.

== Awards and decorations ==
Akiyama received multiple awards and decorations, including:

- 1990 – Order of Friendship of Peoples (10 December 1990, Soviet Union), "for the successful implementation of space flight on the orbital research complex Mir"
- 1991 – Tokyo Metropolitan Cultural Honor award
- 2000 – Japanese Society for Biological Sciences in Space Achievement Award
- 2011 – Medal "For Merit in Space Exploration" (12 April 2011, Russia), "for a great contribution to the development of international cooperation in the field of manned space exploration"

== Publications ==
Akiyama made reports in Japanese, which were published later, dedicated to his space flight. He also co-authored articles on the development of space tourism and farming.

- The Pleasure of Spaceflight, Journal of Space Technology and Science – Vol.9 No.1'93.
- Japanese astronaut official photographic record collection (1991) ISBN 4096805912
- Space Correspondent: Nine Days / Complete Record of the First Japanese Astronaut’s Experience – 1991
- This Is Space Correspondent! I Went to Space! – 1991
- Space – 1 August 1992
- Space (above) (Bungei Bunko) – 1 August 1995
- Space (below) (Bungei Bunko) – 1 August 1995
- Farmer's Diary (1998) ISBN 4104248010
- Journey around agriculture – 1 March 1998
- To living with agriculture – earth and space (1999) ISBN 4000001809
- Hoe and Spacecraft – 30 November 2007
- The Diary of a Nuclear-Powered Refugee: From the Land of Wrath - 2011

== See also ==
- Lists of astronauts
- List of Japanese astronauts
- Mamoru Mohri – first astronaut of an official Japanese space agency
