= British National Space Centre =

Former agency of the government of the United Kingdom

Coordinates: 51.5672°N 1.7855°W

- Official logo of the British National Space Centre

Agency overview
- Abbreviation: BNSC
- Formed: 1985; 41 years ago
- Dissolved: 2010; 16 years ago
- Superseding agency: UK Space Agency
- Type: Space agency
- Jurisdiction: United Kingdom
- Headquarters: Polaris House, Swindon
- Administrator: David Williams
- Primary spaceport: None
- Annual budget: £268 million (US$438 million) (2008/09)

The British National Space Centre (BNSC) was an agency of the Government of the United Kingdom, organised in 1985, that coordinated civil space activities for the United Kingdom. It was replaced on 1 April 2010 by the UK Space Agency.

== Structure ==
BNSC operated as a voluntary partnership of ten British government departments and agencies and Research Councils. The civil portion of the British space programme focused on space science, Earth observation, satellite telecommunications, and global navigation (for example GPS and Galileo). The latest version of the UK civil space strategy which defined the goals of BNSC was published in February 2008. Notably the BNSC had a policy against human spaceflight, and did not contribute to the International Space Station.

=== Staffing arrangements ===
Rather than being a full space agency as maintained by some other countries, BNSC HQ comprised about thirty civil servants on rotation from the partners. The Department for Business, Innovation and Skills (BIS) was the 'host' department and provided the central policy staff including the Director General. The last DG, Dr. David Williams, was the first to have been externally appointed. Much of Britain's yearly civil space budget of £268 million was contributed by the Department of Trade and Industry (until the DTI was broken up in 2007) or controlled by the partnership rather than the BNSC, and about three-quarters of that budget flows directly to the European Space Agency. BNSC staff represented the UK at the various programme boards of ESA and also its governing Council. In 2004, the budget for BNSC headquarters was approximately £500,000 (US$1 million).

From January 2009, the BNSC was headquartered in Swindon, Wiltshire, in the same building as the Science and Technology Facilities Council (Research Councils) and the Technology Strategy Board. BNSC was directed by the Minister for Science and Innovation, Paul Drayson.

== Projects funded through BNSC ==
=== ESA ===
The BNSC was the third largest financial contributor to the General Budget of the European Space Agency, contributing 17.4%, to its Science Programme and to its robotic exploration initiative the Aurora programme. Investments were also made in the ESA telecommunications programme 'ARTES' in order to develop payload technology used, for example, in the satellites of Inmarsat, the UK based mobile satellite operator. The BNSC partnership co-funded a private sector project led by Avanti Communications to build a satellite called HYLAS to provide broadband communications to rural and remote users.

Current projects in the field of space science include LISA Pathfinder, for which UK industry is the prime contractor and UK universities are building major payload elements; the astrometry Gaia mission, for which UK industry is supplying the detectors, avionics, software and data processing electronics; and the James Webb Space Telescope, for which a UK consortium led by the UK Astronomy Technology Centre is building the European part of the Mid Infra Red Instrument (MIRI). The UK has contributed the SPIRE instrument for the Herschel Space Observatory and detector and cooling system technology for the Planck cosmic microwave background mission. In the field of Earth observation, projects include the ESA ADM-Aeolus wind profiling mission, for which UK industry is the prime contractor and CryoSat-2 which is directed by UK scientist Professor Duncan Wingham of University College London. Recent BNSC activities include the Mosaic small satellite programme, which led to the launch of the TopSat high resolution EO mission and also the Disaster Monitoring Constellation.

=== Harwell ===
In November 2008, BNSC announced new contributions to ESA and an agreement in principle to establish an ESA centre at the Harwell Science and Innovation Campus in Oxfordshire. The ESA facility at Harwell was opened officially on 22 July 2009. The name of the ESA centre is the European Centre for Space Applications and Telecommunications. In February 2009, BNSC, ESA and Reaction Engines Limited announced a public–private partnership funding scheme to demonstrate key technologies of the SABRE engine for the proposed Skylon spaceplane.

== Partners ==
BNSC Partners:

- Department for Business, Innovation and Skills
- Department for Transport
- Ministry of Defence
- Foreign and Commonwealth Office
- Department for Environment, Food and Rural Affairs
- Department for Children, Schools and Families
- Technology Strategy Board
- Natural Environment Research Council
- Science and Technology Facilities Council
- Met Office

== See also ==
- British space programme
- Astronautical hygiene
