= Kyoto University of the Arts =

Private educational institution in Kyoto Prefecture, Japan

Coordinates: 35°02′14″N 135°47′32″E

Kyoto University of the Art
- 京都芸術大学
- Location: Sakyo, Kyoto, Japan
- Campus: Uryuyama Campus, Gaien Campus, Osaka Satellite Campus
- Website: https://www.kyoto-art.ac.jp/en/

Map

Kyoto University of the Arts (京都芸術大学, Kyōto geijutsu daigaku), official abbreviated name is ""Urigei", "Kyoto Urigei" (瓜芸、京都瓜芸, Ūrigei, Kyōto Ūrigei) or "KUA", is a for-profit private university in Sakyo-ku, Kyoto, Kyoto, Japan.

The predecessors are the Kyoto Academy of Costume Arts, which was founded in 1934, and the Kyoto Academy of Art and Design, which was established in 1964.

It is a four-year college established in 1991, known as the Kyoto University of Art and Design (京都造形芸術大学, Kyōto zōkei geijutsu daigaku). The name of the university was changed to Kyoto University of the Arts in 2020.

== Departments and Faculties ==
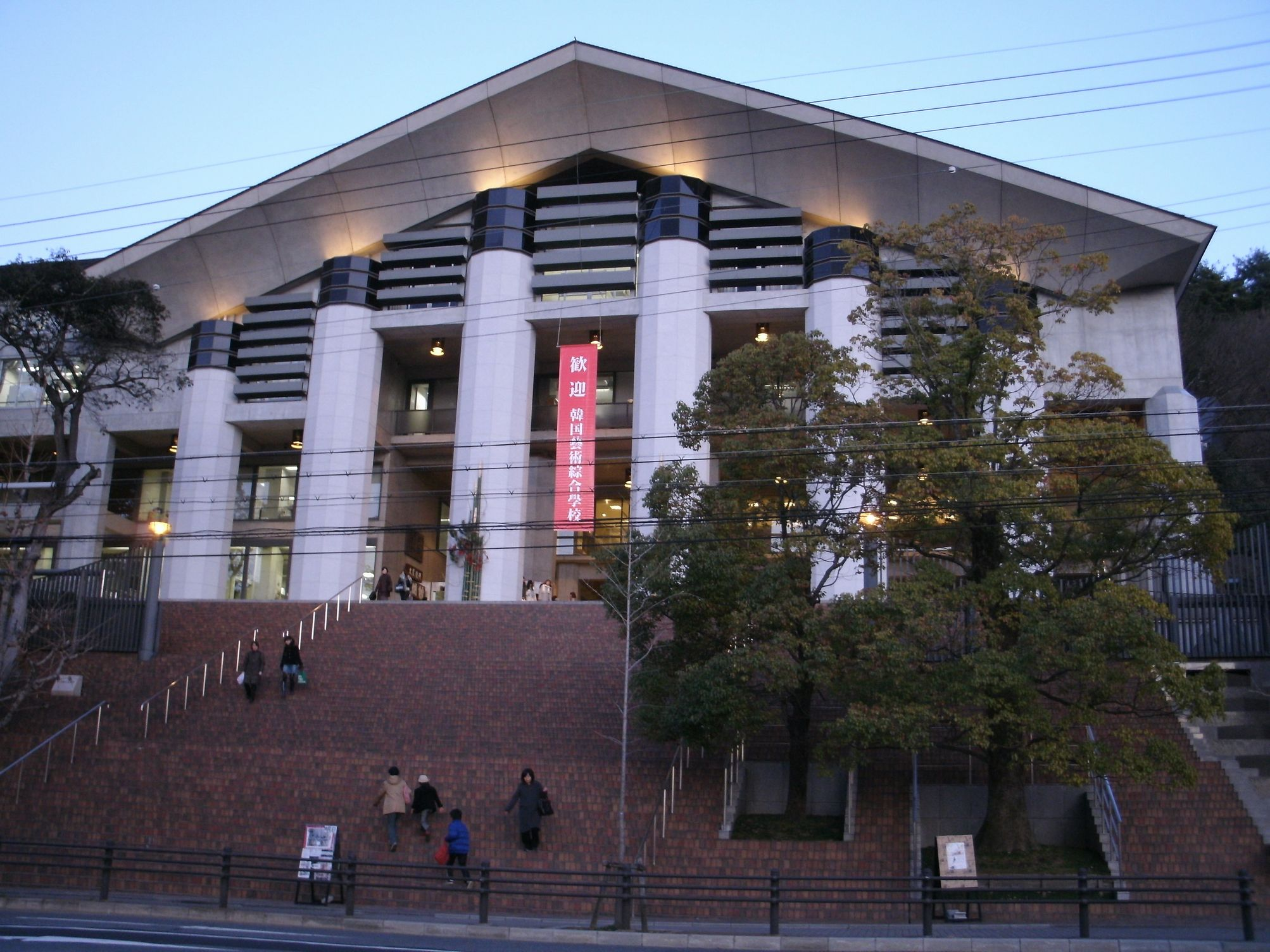
Ningenkan, Kyoto University of Arts and Design

- Faculty of Art and Design
  - Department of Fine and Applied Arts
  - Department of Manga
  - Department of Character Design
  - Department of Information Design
  - Department of Product Design
  - Department of Spatial Design
  - Department of Environmental Design
  - Department of Film Production
  - Department of Performing Arts
  - Department of Creative Writing
  - Department of Art Studies and Cultural Production
  - Department of Art and Child Studies
  - Department of Historical Heritage
