= Helen Sharman =

British chemist and cosmonaut (born 1963)

Helen Sharman CMG OBE HonFRSC
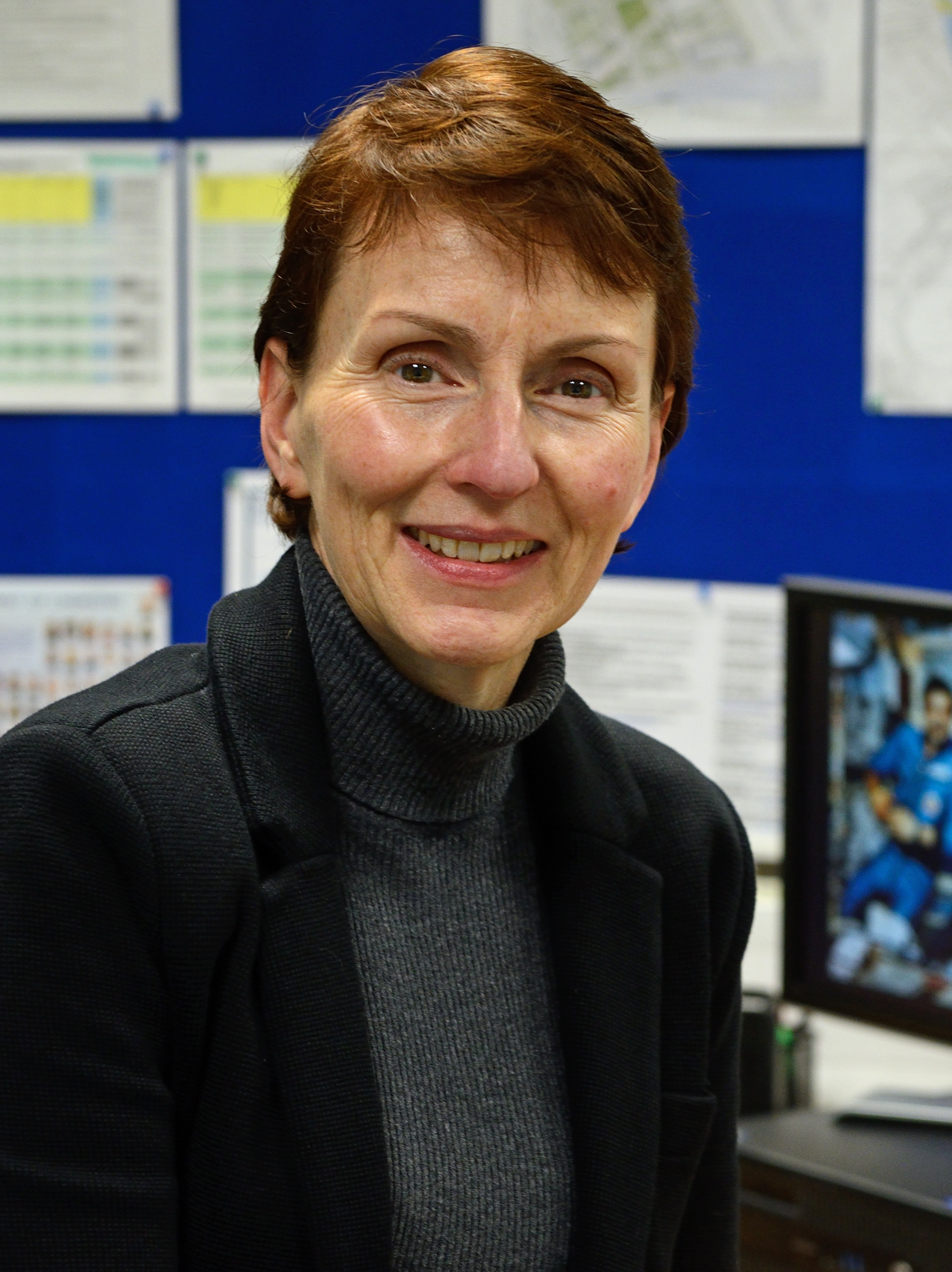
- Sharman in 2015
- Born: Helen Patricia Sharman; 30 May 1963 (age 63); Sheffield, West Riding of Yorkshire, England
- Education: University of Sheffield (BSc in 1984); Birkbeck, University of London (PhD in 1987)
- Occupation: Chemist
- Space career

Project Juno cosmonaut
- Time in space: 7d 21h 13m
- Selection: 1989 Juno
- Mission: Soyuz TM-11, Soyuz TM-12

Helen Patricia Sharman (born 30 May 1963) is a British chemist and cosmonaut who became the first British person, first Western European woman and first privately funded woman in space, as well as the first woman to visit the Mir space station, in May 1991.

== Early life and education ==
Sharman was born in Grenoside, Sheffield, where she attended Grenoside Junior and Infant School, later moving to Greenhill. After studying at Jordanthorpe Comprehensive, she obtained a BSc degree in chemistry at the University of Sheffield in 1984, a MA degree in Central and South-East European Studies from UCL School of Slavonic and East European Studies and a PhD degree from Birkbeck, the University of London in 1987. She worked as a research and development technologist for GEC in London and later as a chemist for the American confectioner Mars, dealing with the flavouring properties of chocolate. This later led the UK press to label her "The Girl from Mars".

== Project Juno ==
After responding to a radio advertisement asking for applicants to be the first British space explorer, Sharman was selected for the mission live on ITV, on 25 November 1989, ahead of nearly 13,000 other applicants. She was commuting home from work when she heard the radio advertisement. “Astronaut wanted. No experience necessary.” The programme was known as Project Juno and was a cooperative Soviet–British mission co-sponsored by a group of British companies. Its aim was to enhance the relationship between the UK and the Soviet Union in the twilight years of the Cold War by sending a British astronaut to the Mir space station.

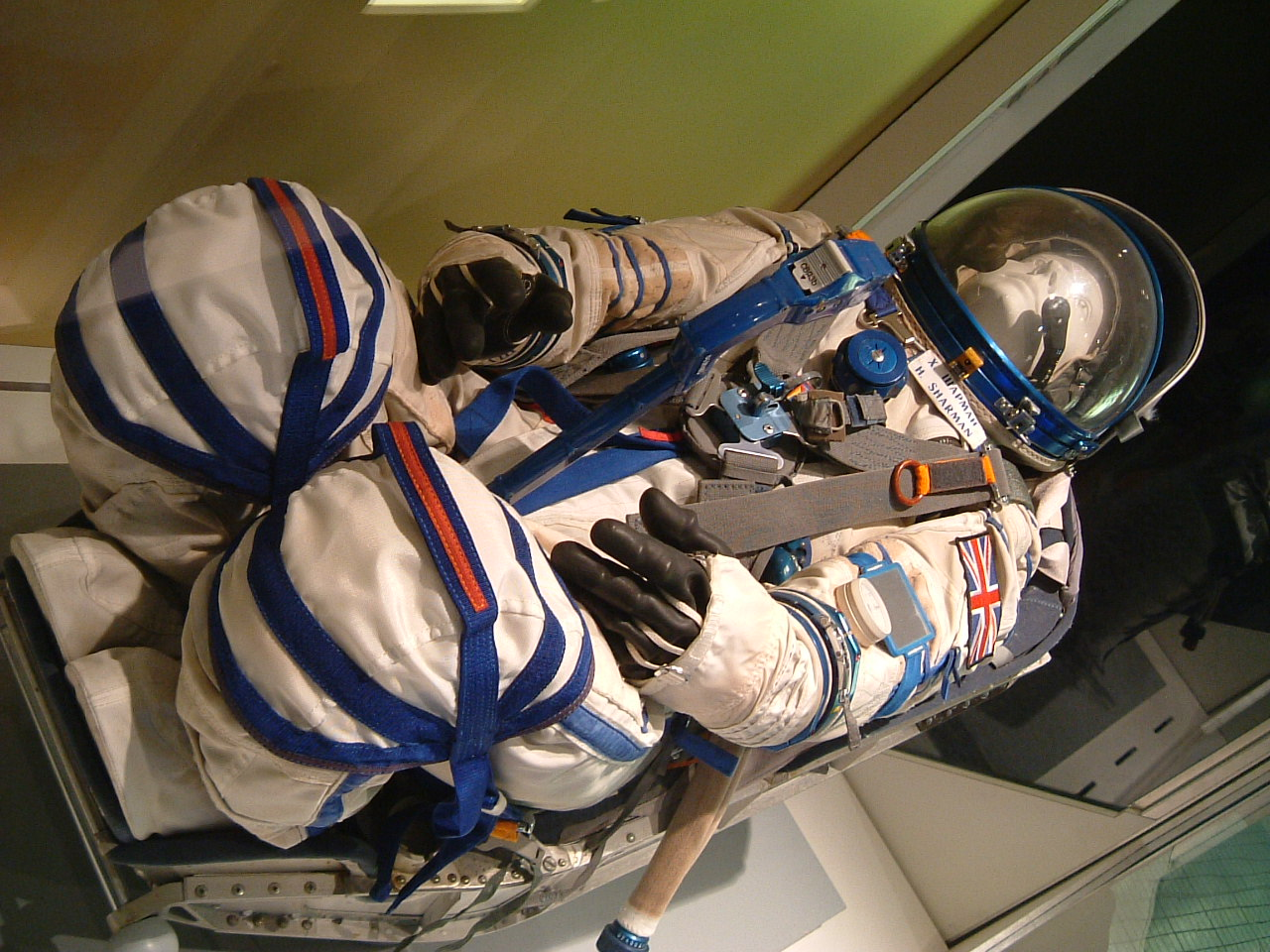
Sokol space suit worn by Sharman, at the National Space Centre in Leicester

Sharman was selected in a process that gave weight to scientific, educational and aerospace backgrounds, as well as the ability to learn a foreign language.

Sharman would later recall that she was more excited about the training than the flying itself, stating “It wasn’t so much going to space as the training that appealed, living in Russia, learning the language, doing advanced mechanics. It was a way out of the rat race.” Before flying, Sharman spent 18 months in intensive flight training in Star City, Moscow. She trained alongside her British back-up Major Tim Mace. The training process was documented in a Scottish Television documentary, 'Mission Juno', broadcast on 28th December 1989.

The Project Juno consortium failed to raise the money expected, and the programme was almost cancelled. With a view toward the flight's impact on international relations, the project proceeded at Soviet expense although as a cost-saving measure, less expensive experiments were substituted for those in the original plans.

The Soyuz TM-12 mission, which included Soviet cosmonauts Anatoly Artsebarsky and Sergei Krikalev, launched on 18 May 1991 and lasted eight days, most of that time spent at the Mir space station. Sharman's tasks included medical and agricultural tests, photographing the British Isles, and participating in a licensed amateur radio hookup with British schoolchildren. She landed aboard Soyuz TM-11 on 26 May 1991, along with Viktor Afanasyev and Musa Manarov. On the launch day, Sharman had a "space passport" with her in case they had to land outside the Soviet Union. She had also carried with her a butterfly brooch her father had given her and a photo of Queen Elizabeth II.

Sharman was 27 years and 11 months old when she went into space, making her (as of 2017) the sixth youngest of the 556 individuals who have flown in space. Sharman has not returned to space, although she was one of three British candidates in the 1992 European Space Agency astronaut selection process and was on the shortlist of 25 applicants in 1998.

Since Juno was not an ESA mission, Tim Peake became the first ESA British astronaut more than 20 years later.

For her Project Juno accomplishments, Sharman received a star on the Sheffield Walk of Fame.

Sharman set several records including;

Record	Date
First British cosmonaut	25 November 1989
First British person in space	18 May 1991
First Western European woman in space	18 May 1991

== Later career ==
Sharman spent the eight years following her mission to Mir self-employed, communicating science to the public. Her autobiography, Seize the Moment, was published in 1993. In 1997 she published a children's book, The Space Place. She has presented radio and television programmes including for BBC Schools.

By 2011, she was working at the National Physical Laboratory as Group Leader of the Surface and Nanoanalysis Group. Sharman became Operations Manager for the Department of Chemistry at Imperial College London in 2015. She continues outreach activities related to chemistry and her spaceflight, and in 2015 was awarded an Honorary Fellowship from the British Science Association.

In August 2016, Sharman appeared as herself in an episode of the Channel 4 soap opera Hollyoaks.

In January 2020, Sharman said in an interview that "aliens exist, there are no two ways about it" but that "it's possible ... we simply can't see them", a reference to the idea of a shadow biosphere.

In April 2026, Sharman was "in conversation with" former BBC presenter Dr Hermione Cockburn in the Usher Hall, as part of the Edinburgh Science Festival

== Awards and honours ==
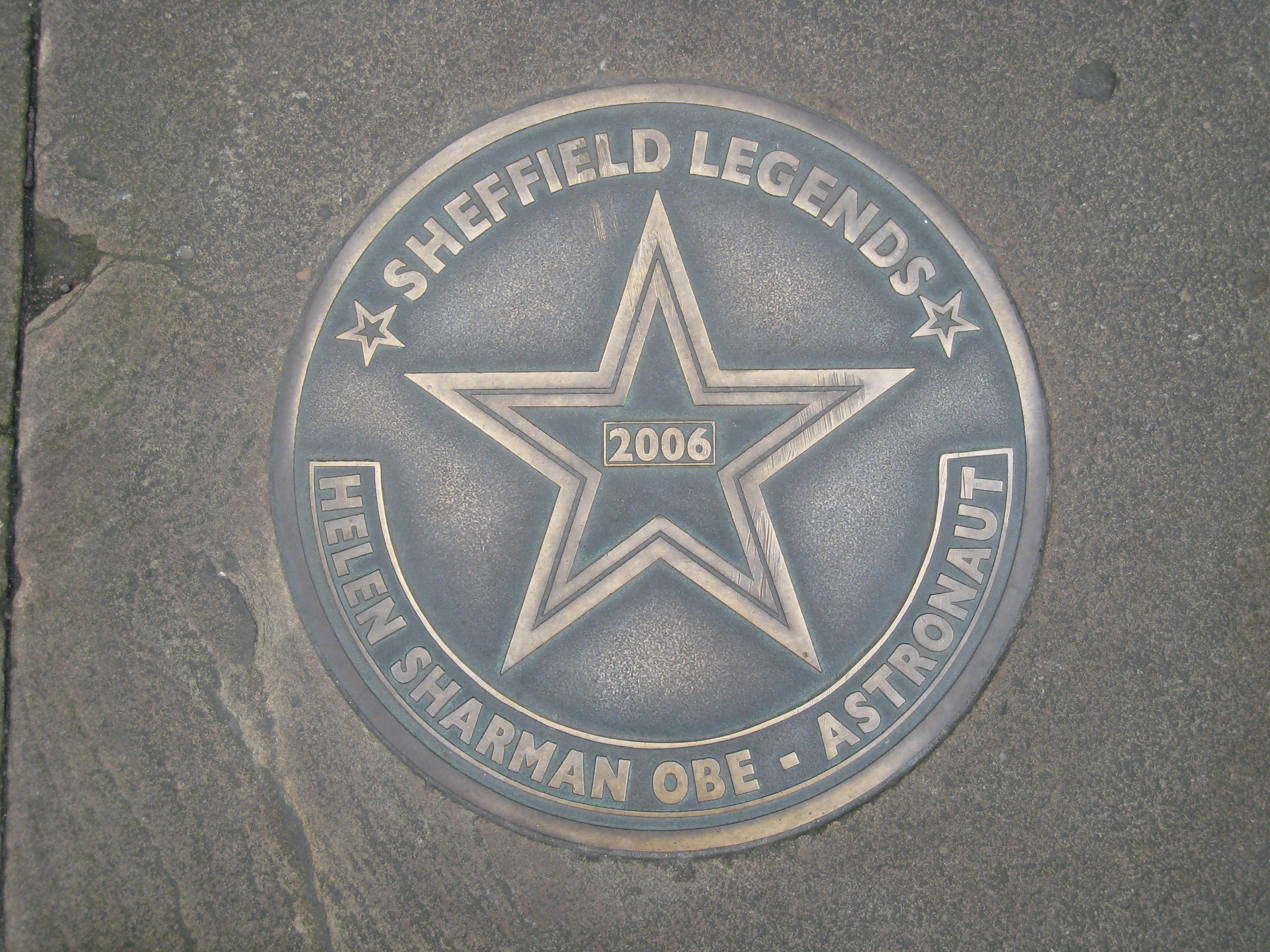
Star on Sheffield Walk of Fame

Sharman was awarded the bronze and silver and gold Medal of the Royal Aero Club, in 1990. Then, in 1991, she was chosen to light the flame at the 1991 Summer Universiade, held in Sheffield. On live international television, she tripped while running through the infield of Don Valley Stadium, sending the burning embers onto the track. Encouraged to continue her run, without any flame from the torch, she proceeded round the track and climbed to the ceremonial flame. Despite the lack of any fire from the torch the ceremonial flame still ignited.

Sharman was appointed an Officer of the Order of the British Empire (OBE) in the 1992 Birthday Honours, and the following year an Honorary Fellow of the Royal Society of Chemistry (HonFRSC). Sharman was appointed a Companion of the Order of St Michael and St George (CMG) in the 2018 New Year Honours for services to Science and Technology Outreach.

On 26 May 1991, by Decree of the President of the USSR No. UP-2010, Helen was awarded the "Order of Friendship of Peoples".

In 1992, she was awarded the Presidents' Medal, by SCI – an award which recognises exemplary leadership aligned with SCI’s purpose.

On 12 April 2011, by Decree of the President of the Russian Federation No. 437, she was awarded the Medal "For Merit in Space Exploration".

The British School in Assen, Netherlands is named the Helen Sharman School after her.

Additionally, Sharman has been recognised by multiple schools by having houses named in her honour. There is a house named after her at Wallington High School for Girls, a grammar school in the London Borough of Sutton, where each house is named after a high achieving and influential woman. The science block of Bullers Wood School, Chislehurst, Kent was opened by Sharman in 1994 and is called Sharman House. There is a house named after her at Great Western Academy, in Swindon, where she opened the Sixth Form. She has also been honoured at Rugby High School for Girls a girls' grammar school where houses are named after four influential women, and a Sharman house at Moorlands School, Leeds, where houses are named after inspiring people from Yorkshire. In the 2021/22 academic year, the independent girls' school Notting Hill and Ealing High School is introducing a new fourth house, which will bear Sharman's name in recognition of her as a pioneer for women in STEM.

In addition to this, residential development in Stafford in the West Midlands of England has a street named Helen Sharman Drive after her, and a block of student flats in Sheffield bears her name. The true identity of the fictional comic-book character Steel Bolt was also named partly in homage to her.

She has received several honorary degrees from UK universities, including:

Year	Honour	University	Ref.
1991	Honorary Fellow	Sheffield Hallam University	
1995	Honorary Doctor of Science degree	University of Kent	
1996	Honorary Doctor of Technology degree	University of Plymouth	
1997	Honorary Doctor of Science degree	Southampton Solent University	
1998	Honorary Doctor of Science degree	Staffordshire University	
1999	Honorary Doctor of Science degree	University of Exeter	
2010	Honorary Doctor of Science degree	Brunel University London	
2017	Honorary Doctor of Science degree	Kingston University	
2017	Honorary Doctor of Science degree	University of Hull	
2017	Honorary Doctor of Science degree	University of Sheffield	
2018	Honorary Doctor of Health Sciences degree	York St John University	

== Bibliography ==
- Seize the Moment: Autobiography of Britain's First Astronaut, autobiography, with Christopher Priest and a foreword by Arthur C. Clarke (Londo : Gollancz, 1993 – ISBN 0-575-05819-6
- The Space Place (Making Sense of Science), children's book, illustrated by Mic Rolph (Portland Press, 1997. ISBN 1-85578-092-5)
