= Falstaff (rocket) =

Rocket

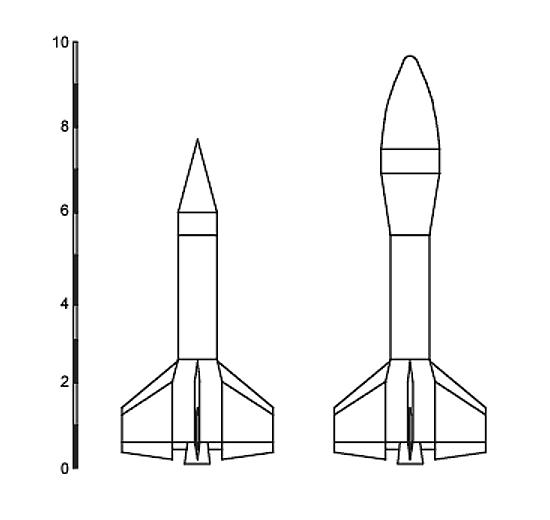
- Function: Research rocket
- Country of origin: United Kingdom

Size
- Height: 5.3 m (17 ft)
- Diameter: 92 cm (36 in)
- Mass: 5,090 kilograms (11,220 lb)
- Stages: 1

Capacity

Payload to {{{to}}}

Launch history
- Status: Retired
- Launch sites: Woomera Test Range
- Total launches: 8
- Success(es): 7
- Failure(s): 1
- First flight: 1 October 1969
- Last flight: 4 April 1979
- Carries passengers or cargo: Penetration Aids Carrier (PAC)

stage
- Maximum thrust: 240 kilonewtons (54,000 lb_{f})
- Burn time: 37 seconds

Falstaff was a British sounding rocket used during the 1970s as part of the Chevaline programme to improve the penetrability of the Polaris nuclear missile. It was the largest UK rocket with a solid booster ever launched.

== Polaris ==
The Falstaff was part of the Chevaline programme to improve the Polaris programme. The Penetration Aids Carrier (PAC) was capable of maneuvering a Falstaff rocket and dispensing missiles. According to John Pitfield, the PAC was launched in 1969, 1975, 1976 and 1978.

Since the Australian government at the time was not in favour of nuclear weapons, the testing of the Falstaff vehicles on Australian soil had the potential to cause embarrassment. The details of over 4000 launches from the Woomera Range are still not fully released.

Before the revelation that the Falstaff rockets were part of a nuclear program, anti-nuclear campaigners in Australia had believed that testing ended in 1963.

== Design ==
The Falstaff with the Stonechat Mk 2 booster was 5.3 m (17 ft) long and had a diameter of 92 cm (36 in). It weighed 5.09 tonnes (5.01 long tons; 5.61 short tons) of which 4.34 tonnes (4.27 long tons; 4.78 short tons) was solid propellant. It delivered an average thrust of 240 kilonewtons (54,000 lb_{f}) during 37 seconds.

== Launches ==
The Falstaff was launched eight times between 1969 and 1979. All the launches were from the Woomera Test Range in Australia, 500 kilometres (310 mi) north-west of Adelaide.

The first launch on 1 October 1969 used the Stonechat Mk 1 booster. The seven next launched used the Mk 2 variant. There was one failure, on 23 April 1978.

| Date | Site | Vehicle | Apogee (km) | Result |
|---|---|---|---|---|
| 1 October 1969 | Woomera | Mk.I | | Success |
| 9 May 1975 | Woomera | Mk.II F0 | 119 | Success |
| 19 February 1976 | Woomera | Mk.II F0 1 | 117 | Success |
| 23 May 1978 | Woomera | Mk.II F1 | | Vehicle failure |
| 15 September 1978 | Woomera | Mk.II F2 | 97 | Success |
| 5 December 1978 | Woomera | Mk.II F3 | 98 | Payload failure |
| 14 February 1979 | Woomera | Mk.II F4 | 93 | Success |
| 4 April 1979 | Woomera | Mk.II F5 | 103 | Success |

== Commemoration ==
The Falstaff rocket was commemorated in an event cover that depicted a rocket recognisable as a Falstaff. 5 December 1978 was commemorated in such a way.
