= Viktor Afanasyev (cosmonaut) =

Soviet-Russian Air Force colonel and cosmonaut (born 1948)

- Виктор Афанасьев
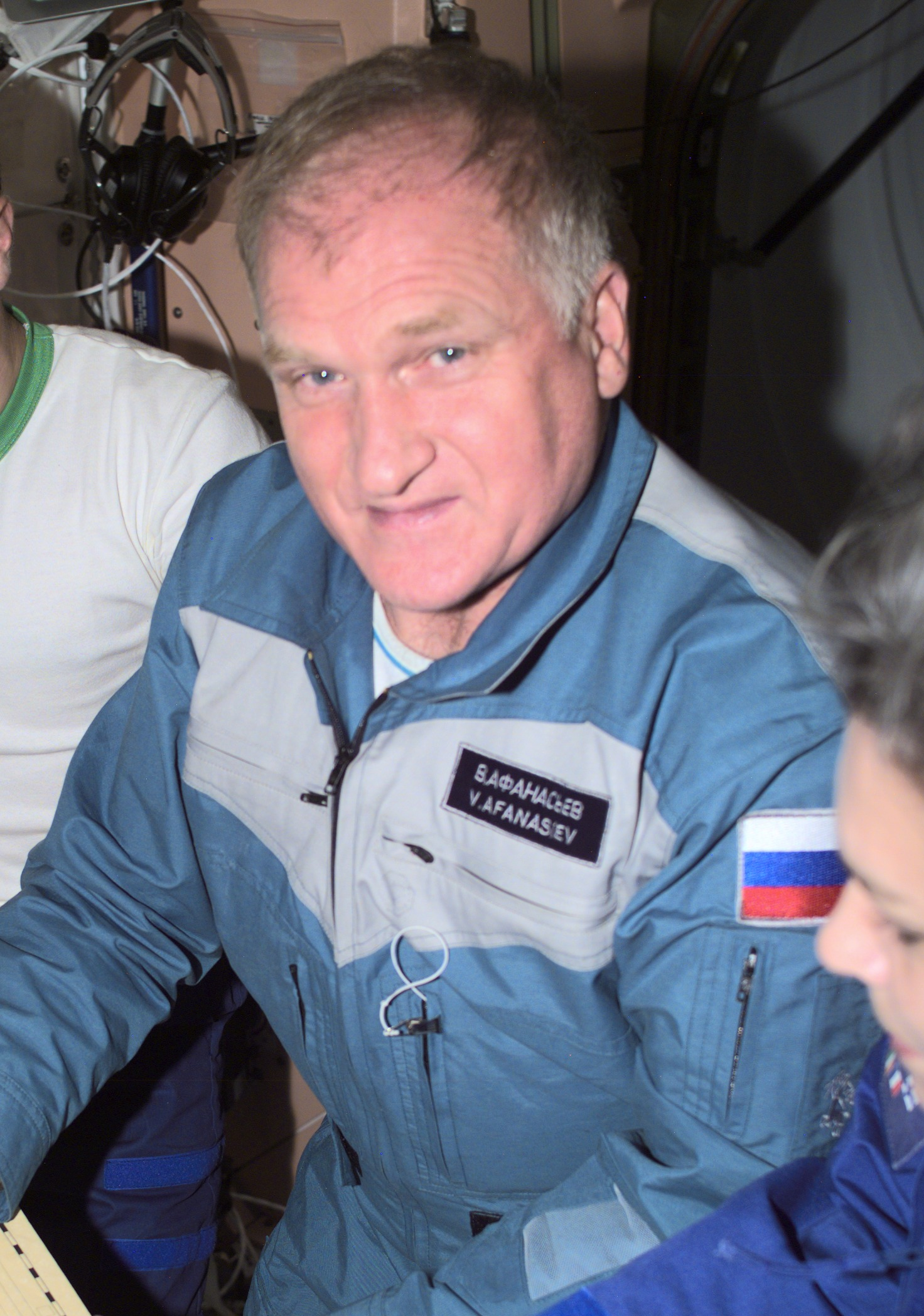
- Born: Viktor Mikhailovich Afanasyev; 31 December 1948; Bryansk, Russian SFSR, Soviet Union
- Occupation: Pilot
- Awards: Hero of the Soviet Union
- Space career

Roscosmos cosmonaut
- Status: Retired
- Rank: Colonel, Russian Air Force
- Time in space: 555d 18h 33m
- Selection: 1985 Cosmonaut Group
- Total EVAs: 7
- Total EVA time: 38 hours 04 minutes
- Missions: Soyuz TM-11 (Mir EO-8), Soyuz TM-18 (Mir EO-15), Soyuz TM-29 (Mir EO-27), Soyuz TM-33/Soyuz TM-32 (ISS EP-2)
- Retired: 17 April 2006

Viktor Mikhailovich Afanasyev (Russian: Виктор Михайлович Афанасьев; born 31 December 1948) is a colonel in the Russian Air Force and a test cosmonaut of the Yu. A. Gagarin Cosmonaut Training Center. He was born 31 December 1948, in Bryansk, Russian SFSR, and is married to Yelena Ya. Afanasyeva, born in 1952. They have two children. His father, Mikhail Z. Afanasyev, is deceased. His mother, Marya S. Afanasyeva, resides in Merkulyevo, Bryansk region, Russia. His recreational interests include football, swimming, and tourism. He considers his favorite meal to be borscht.

== Education ==
Graduated from Kachynskoye Military Pilot School in 1970 and the Ordzhonikidze Aviation Institute, Moscow, in 1980.

== Special honors ==
Hero of the Soviet Union; Pilot-Cosmonaut of the USSR.

== Experience ==
1970 to 1976 served in the Air Force fighting troops as a pilot, senior pilot, and aircraft flight commander. 1976 to 1977 attended the Test Pilot Training Center. 1977 to 1988 served as a test pilot and senior test pilot at the State Research/Test Institute named after Valery Chkalov. Viktor Afanasyev has a Class 1 military test pilot certification. He has logged over 2000 flight hours in more than 40 different aircraft.

=== GCTC experience ===
1985 to 1987 Viktor Afanasyev was taking a basic space training course at the Yuri Gagarin Cosmonaut Training Center on a part-time training basis. He reported to the GCTC and proceeded to advanced training in 1988. From February 1989 on Afanasyev was training for a space flight aboard the Mir orbital station as the Mir-7 mission backup crew commander.

He has logged 175 flight days during his first space flight (2 December 1990 to 26 May 1991) as the Mir-8 mission crew commander. The mission program included a joint flight with a Japanese and British crewmember. He performed 4 EVAs totaling 20 hours and 55 minutes.

8 January to 9 July 1994, Afanasyev was participating in a space flight aboard the Soyuz-TM-18 transport vehicle and Mir orbital station as the Mir-15 mission crew commander.

October 1996 to January 1998 Afanasyev was training for the Mir-25 mission as a backup crew commander. The mission was supposed to include NASA-7 and Pegasus (CNES) programs.

From March 1998 he underwent training as the Mir-27 mission primary crew commander. 20 February to 28 August 1999, he was participating in a 189-day space flight aboard the Soyuz-TM transport vehicle and Mir orbital station. He has performed 3 EVAs.

Colonel Afanasyev is a veteran of three long-duration missions. He has logged over 545 days in space, and 7 EVAs totaling 38.55 hours. He has a Class 1 cosmonaut certification.

In 2001 Viktor Afanasyev was assigned to the ISS Taxi-1 backup crew.

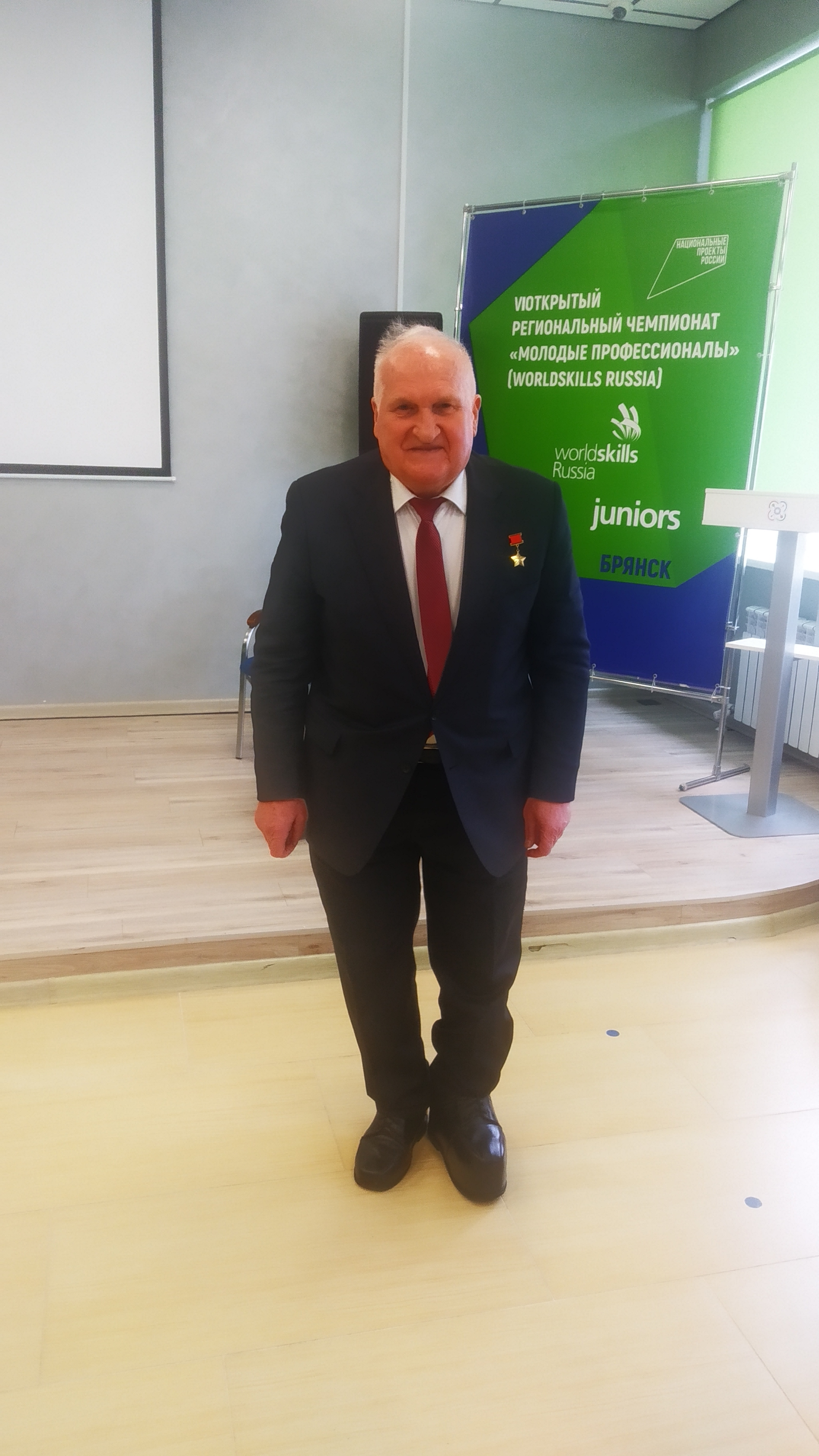
Viktor Afanasyev (24-04-2022)

== Honours and awards ==
- Hero of the Soviet Union (26 May 1991) – for the successful implementation of spaceflight on the orbital scientific research complex Mir and displaying courage and heroism
- Order of Merit for the Fatherland, 2nd class (10 April 2002) – for their courage and professionalism shown during the implementation of space flight on the International Space Station; 3rd class (22 November 1999) – for their courage and heroism displayed during prolonged space flight on the orbital scientific research complex Mir
- Order for Personal Courage (18 August 1994) – for their courage and bravery shown during prolonged space flight on the orbital scientific research complex Mir
- Order of Lenin (26 May 1991)
- Order for Service to the Homeland in the Armed Forces of the USSR, 3rd class (21 February 1985)
- Medal "For Merit in Space Exploration" (12 April 2011) – for the great achievements in the field of research, development, and use of outer space, many years of diligent work, public activities
- Grand Officier of the Legion of Honour (France)
- Pilot-Cosmonaut of the USSR (26 May 1991) – for the implementation of space flight on the orbital scientific research complex Mir
