= Soyuz TM-11 =

1990 Soviet crewed spaceflight to Mir

- COSPAR ID: 1990-107A
- SATCAT no.: 20981
- Mission duration: 175 days, 1 hour, 50 minutes, 41 seconds
- Orbits completed: ~2,735

Spacecraft properties
- Spacecraft: Soyuz 7K-STM No. 61
- Spacecraft type: Soyuz-TM
- Manufacturer: NPO Energia
- Launch mass: 7,150 kilograms (15,760 lb)

Crew
- Crew size: 3
- Members: Viktor Afanasyev; Musa Manarov
- Launching: Toyohiro Akiyama
- Landing: Helen Sharman
- Callsign: Дербе́нт (Derbent)

Start of mission
- Launch date: 2 December 1990, 08:13:32 UTC
- Rocket: Soyuz-U2

End of mission
- Landing date: 26 May 1991, 10:04:13 UTC
- Landing site: near Dzhezkazgan

Orbital parameters
- Reference system: Geocentric
- Regime: Low Earth
- Perigee altitude: 367 kilometres (228 mi)
- Apogee altitude: 400 kilometres (250 mi)
- Inclination: 51.6 degrees
- Period: 92.2 minutes

Docking with Mir
- Docking date: 4 December 1990, 09:57:09 UTC
- Undocking date: 26 May 1991, 06:15:59 UTC
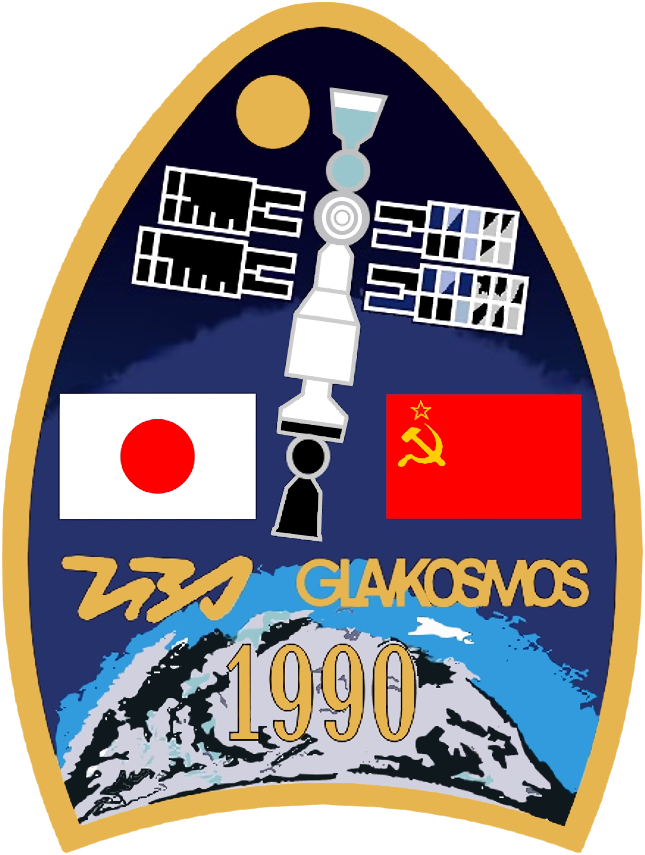
- Soyuz programme (Crewed missions)

Soyuz TM-11 was the eleventh expedition to the Russian space station Mir, using a Soyuz-TM crew transport vessel. The mission notably carried a Japanese television reporter from Tokyo Broadcasting System.

== Crew ==
Position	Launching crew	Landing crew
Commander	Viktor Afanasyev; First spaceflight	
Flight engineer	Musa Manarov; Second and last spaceflight	
Research cosmonaut	Toyohiro Akiyama, TBS (reporter); Only spaceflight	Helen Sharman, Project Juno; Only spaceflight

== Mission highlights ==
Soyuz TM-11 was the 11th expedition to Mir, which spent 175 days docked to the space station. Coincidentally it was launched on the same day as STS-35. As the mission carried Toyohiro Akiyama, a reporter for the Japanese television network Tokyo Broadcasting System, the spacecraft's launch shroud and its Soyuz booster were painted with the Japanese flag and advertisements for Sony, Unicharm, and Otsuka Pharmaceutical. A camera inside the descent module filmed the cosmonauts during ascent for Akiyama's network.

Viktor Afanaseyev, Musa Manarov (on his second Mir visit), and Toyohiro Akiyama were welcomed aboard Mir by Soviet cosmonauts. Akiyama's network paid for the flight. The Soviets called this their first commercial spaceflight and claimed to have earned $14 million. The journalist was scheduled to make one 10-min TV broadcast and two 20-min radio broadcasts each day. Electrical power and video and TV system incompatibilities forced the Japanese to make extensive use of converters. His equipment, which weighed about 170 kg, was delivered by Progress-M spacecraft and set up in advance by Manakov and Strekalov. On December 5 Akiyama's couch was transferred to Soyuz-TM 10. On December 8 Manakov and Strekalov commenced loading Soyuz-TM 10's descent module with film and experiment results. TBS broadcast Akiyama's landing live from Kazakhstan.
