= 19th British Academy Film Awards =

1966 film awards ceremony

- Date: 1966

Highlights
- Best Film: My Fair Lady
- Best British Film: The Ipcress File
- Most awards: Darling (4)
- Most nominations: Darling, The Hill, & The Knack ...and How to Get It (6)

The 19th British Academy Film Awards, given by the British Academy of Film and Television Arts in 1966, honoured the best films of 1965.

== Winners and nominees ==
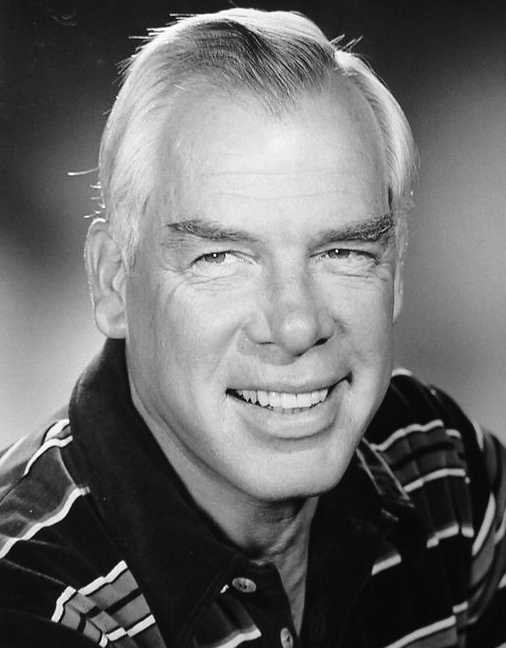
Lee Marvin, Best Foreign Actor winner

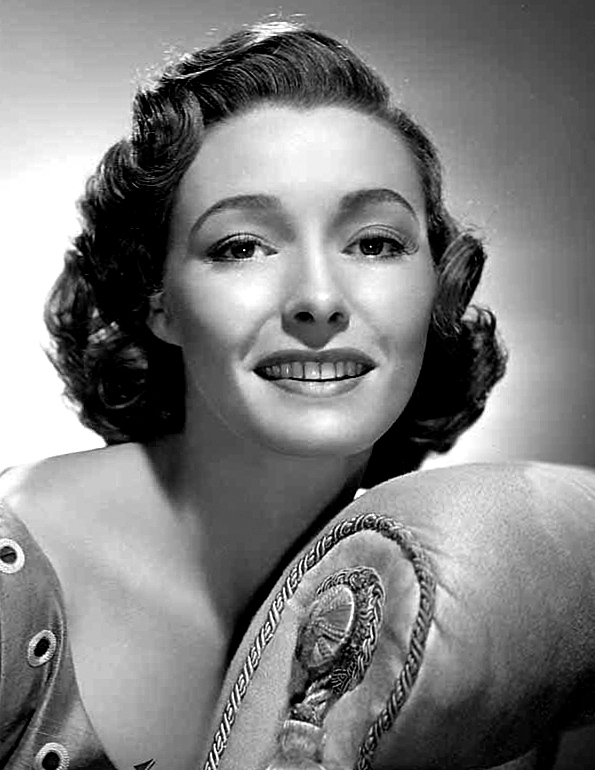
Patricia Neal, Best Foreign Actress winner

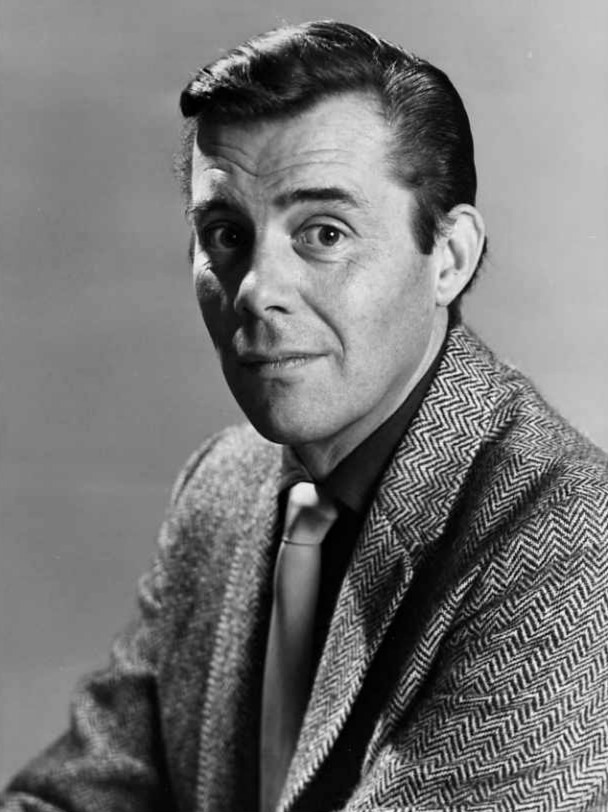
Dirk Bogarde, Best British Actor winner

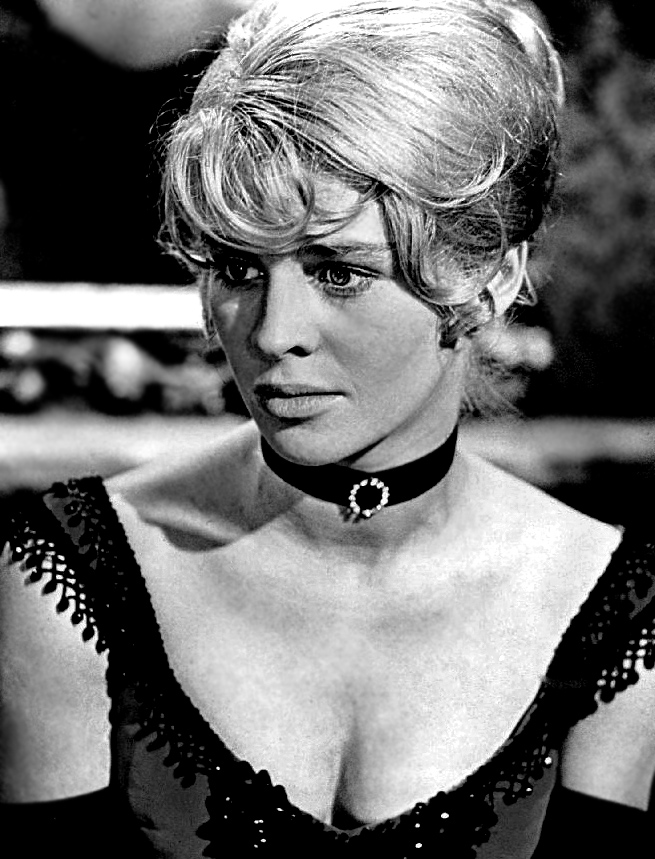
Julie Christie, Best British Actress winner

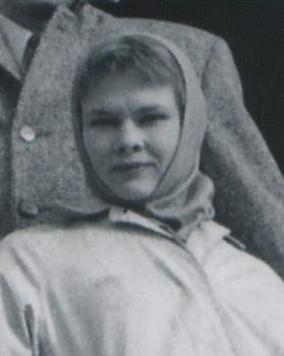
Judi Dench, Best Newcomer winner

Best Film My Fair Lady – George Cukor: Hamlet – Grigori Kozintsev; The Hill – Sidney Lumet; The Knack ...and How to Get It – Richard Lester; Zorba the Greek – Michael Cacoyannis	Best Documentary Tokyo Olympiad – Kon Ichikawa: Brute Force and Finesse – Max Morgan-Witts; Deckie Learner – Michael Grigsby; Stravinsky – Roman Kroitor and Wolf Koenig
Best Foreign Actor Lee Marvin – Cat Ballou as Kid Shelleen / Tim Strawn; Lee Marvin – The Killers as Charlie Strom: Anthony Quinn – Zorba the Greek as Alexis Zorba; Innokenty Smoktunovsky – Hamlet as Prince Hamlet; Jack Lemmon – How to Murder Your Wife as Stanley Ford; Jack Lemmon – Good Neighbor Sam as Sam Bissell; Oskar Werner – Ship of Fools as Dr. Schumann	Best Foreign Actress Patricia Neal – In Harm's Way as Lieutenant Maggie Haines: Jane Fonda – Cat Ballou as Cat Ballou; Lila Kedrova – Zorba the Greek as Madame Hortense; Simone Signoret – Ship of Fools as La Condesa
Best British Actor Dirk Bogarde – Darling as Robert Gold: Harry Andrews – The Hill as R.S.M. Bert Wilson; Michael Caine – The Ipcress File as Harry Palmer; Rex Harrison – My Fair Lady as Professor Henry Higgins	Best British Actress Julie Christie – Darling as Diana Scott: Julie Andrews – The Americanization of Emily as Emily Barham; Julie Andrews – The Sound of Music as Maria von Trapp; Maggie Smith – Young Cassidy as Nora; Rita Tushingham – The Knack ...and How to Get It as Nancy Jones
Best British Film The Ipcress File – Sidney J. Furie: Darling – John Schlesinger; The Hill – Sidney Lumet; The Knack ...and How to Get It – Richard Lester	Best British Screenplay Darling – Frederic Raphael: The Hill – Ray Rigby; The Ipcress File – W. H. Canaway and James Doran; The Knack ...and How to Get It – Charles Wood
Best Production Design, Black and White Darling – Ray Simm: The Bedford Incident – Arthur Lawson; The Hill – Herbert Smith; Rotten to the Core – Alex Vetchinsky	Best Production Design, Colour The Ipcress File – Ken Adam: Lord Jim – Geoffrey Drake; Those Magnificent Men in Their Flying Machines – Thomas N. Morahan; Thunderball – Ken Adam
Best Cinematography, Black and White The Hill – Oswald Morris: Darling – Kenneth Higgins; The Knack ...and How to Get It – David Watkin; Repulsion – Gilbert Taylor	Best Cinematography, Colour The Ipcress File – Otto Heller: Help! – David Watkin; Lord Jim – Freddie Young; Those Magnificent Men in Their Flying Machines – Christopher Challis
Best Costume Design Those Magnificent Men in Their Flying Machines – Osbert Lancaster and Dinah Greet: The Amorous Adventures of Moll Flanders – Elizabeth Haffenden and Joan Bridge; Help! – Julie Harris; A Shot in the Dark – Margaret Furse; Young Cassidy – Margaret Furse	Best Animated Film Be Careful Boys – Vera Linnecar, Nancy Hanna and Keith Learner: The Bargain – Beryl Stevens; Birds, Bees and Storks – John Halas; The Hoffnung Symphony Orchestra – Harold Whitaker
Best Short Film Rig Move – Don Higgins: 60 Cycles – Jean-Claude Labrecque; One of Them Is Brett – Roger Graef	Best Specialised Film I Do: And I Understand – Derek Williams: Town Nurse, Country Nurse – Don Higgins
Most Promising Newcomer to Leading Film Roles Judi Dench – Four in the Morning as Wife: Barbara Ferris – Catch Us If You Can as Dinah; Michael Crawford – The Knack ...and How to Get It as Colin; Tom Nardini – Cat Ballou as Jackson Two-Bears	United Nations Award Tokyo Olympiad – Kon Ichikawa: Fail Safe – Sidney Lumet; King Rat – Bryan Forbes; Zorba the Greek – Michael Cacoyannis

== Statistics ==
Films that received multiple nominations
Nominations	Film
6	Darling
6	The Hill
6	The Knack ...and How to Get It
5	The Ipcress File
4	Zorba the Greek
3	Cat Ballou
3	Those Magnificent Men in Their Flying Machines
2	Hamlet
2	Help!
2	Lord Jim
2	My Fair Lady
2	Ship of Fools
2	Tokyo Olympiad

Films that received multiple awards
Awards	Film
4	Darling
3	The Ipcress File
2	Tokyo Olympiad
