= Allen Wheeler =

Royal Air Force officer and pilot (1903–1984)

- Born: Allen Henry Wheeler; 27 September 1903; Bitterley, Shropshire, England
- Died: 1 January 1984 (aged 80); Berkshire, England
- Military career
- Allegiance: United Kingdom
- Branch: Royal Air Force
- Service years: 1925–1955
- Rank: Air Commodore
- Service number: 05109
- Commands: RAF Fairford; RAF Cyprus; Aeroplane and Armament Experimental Establishment
- Conflicts: Second World War
- Awards: Commander of the Order of the British Empire

Air Commodore Allen Henry Wheeler CBE FRAeS (27 September 1903 – 1 January 1984) was a Royal Air Force officer and pilot who served during the Second World War. He was later trustee of the Shuttleworth Trust, a collection of vintage cars and aircraft.

== Early life ==
Wheeler was born on 27 September 1903 in the village of Bitterley near Ludlow, Shropshire. He was educated at Eton College and Trinity College, Cambridge and then commissioned as a Pilot Officer in the Royal Air Force in 1925 where he trained as an engineer and pilot.

== Royal Air Force ==
Between 1941 and 1943 he commanded the Performance Testing Squadron at RAF Boscombe Down and the Experimental Flying Department at the Royal Aircraft Establishment, (RAE), Farnborough. He took the opportunity to fly a number of captured Germany aircraft including the Focke-Wulf Fw 190 and while at the RAF was one of the few pilots to fly the first British jet aircraft the Gloster E.28/39.

Following his duties in experimental and test flying he became involved in developing support for airborne forces, he commanded RAF Fairford during the Normandy landings and the operations at Arnhem. Promoted to Air Commodore, Wheeler was appointed Senior Air Staff Officer in South-east Asia. Between 1950 and 1951 he commanded the RAF in Cyprus before returning to the Aeroplane and Armament Experimental Establishment (A&AEE) at Boscombe Down between 1952 and 1955 when he retired.

== Later life ==
Wheeler became involved in the flying and restoration of historic aircraft and became a trustee of the Shuttleworth Trust collection of vintage cars and aircraft.

In 1965 he was technical advisor and a pilot involved in the film, Those Magnificent Men in their Flying Machines.

Wheeler died in Berkshire on 1 January 1984.

== Promotions ==
17 January 1925: Pilot Officer (seniority 17 January 1924);

17 July 1925: Flying Officer;

14 May 1930: Flight Lieutenant;

1 April 1937: Squadron Leader;

12 March 1940: Wing Commander;

1 March 1942: temporary Group Captain;

Acting Air Commodore

Air Commodore

== Author ==
Wheeler authored the following books:

- ...that nothing failed them (1963)
- Building aeroplanes for 'those magnificent men' (1965)
- Flying between the Wars (1972)

== Honours and awards ==
- 1 January 1945 – Acting Air Commodore Allen Henry Wheeler, Royal Air Force is appointed an Officer of the Order of the British Empire (OBE)

This officer is Station Commander at Fairford. He was faced with a very difficult task in the preparation for the landings in Normandy on D Day. He took over a new and unfinished station in February and had to weld into an efficient fighting machine a depleted squadron transferred from Bomber Command and a squadron just commencing to form. Group Captain Wheeler not only brought both squadrons up to a high state of efficiency but also organized the station to deal with the despatch of a large number of gliders in a minimum period of time. Throughout his service in the Group, he has displayed drive, initiative and leadership which he has used to the greatest advantage. He has set an excellent example by himself participating in operations.

- 1 January 1955 – Air Commodore Allen Henry Wheeler OBE, Royal Air Force is promoted to be a Commander of the Order of the British Empire (CBE)
- Mentioned in Despatches, 1 January 1941

== Views of other aviators ==
Dennis Neville who formed "Captain Neville's FLying Circus" lists as one of his most memorable aviation moments as:-

Performing a 'falling leaf' in an Avro 504 at Farnborough, 30 years after seeing Alan [sic] Wheeler perform the same.

In his book Wings on My Sleeve (page 157 et seq), Capt. Eric "Winkle" Brown records his admiration of a number of erstwhile colleagues who deserve recognition:-

"I was fortunate to have such fine C.O.s as Alan Hards, Dick Ubee, Silyn Roberts, and Alan [sic] Wheeler"

== Other sources ==
- The London Gazette Issue 33015, dated 27 January 1925
- The London Gazette Issue 33076, dated 18 August 1925
- The London Gazette Issue 33605, dated 13 May 1930
- The London Gazette Issue 34385, dated 2 April 1937
- The London Gazette Issue 34810, dated 12 March 1940
- Supplement to The London Gazette of 31 December 1940, Issue 35029, dated 1 January 1941
- The London Gazette Issue 35503, dated 27 March 1942
- Ninth Supplement to The London Gazette of 28 December 1945, Issue 37415, dated 1 January 1946
