= Eric Brown (pilot) =

Royal Navy test pilot, author (1920–2016)

Captain Eric Brown CBE DSC AFC
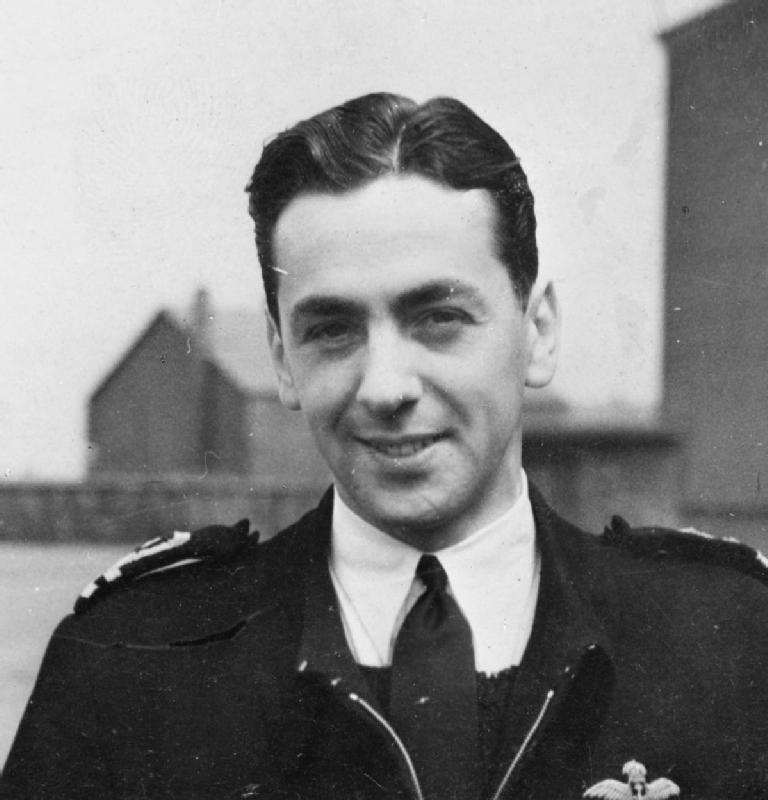
- Brown as a lieutenant RNVR, c. 1939-45
- Born: 21 January 1920; Hackney, London, England
- Died: 21 February 2016 (aged 96); Redhill, Surrey, England
- Military career
- Allegiance: United Kingdom
- Branch: Royal Navy
- Service years: 1939–1970
- Rank: Captain
- Nickname: Winkle
- Conflicts: Second World War: Channel Front; Battle of the Atlantic
- Awards: Commander of the Order of the British Empire; Distinguished Service Cross; Air Force Cross; King's Commendation for Valuable Service in the Air
- Other work: Aviation consultant; Author

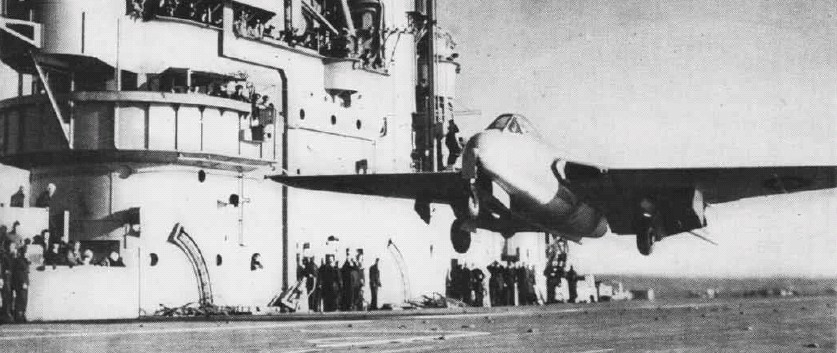
On 3 December 1945, Brown became the first pilot to land on and take off (pictured) from an aircraft carrier in a jet aircraft, when he flew a de Havilland Sea Vampire to HMS Ocean.

Captain Eric Melrose "Winkle" Brown, CBE, DSC, AFC, Hon FRAeS (21 January 1920 – 21 February 2016) was a British Royal Navy officer and test pilot who flew 487 types of aircraft, more than anyone else in history.

Brown held the world record for the most aircraft carrier deck take-offs and landings performed (2,271 and 2,407 respectively) and achieved several "firsts" in naval aviation, including the first landing on an aircraft carrier of a jet aircraft.

Brown flew almost every category of Royal Navy and Royal Air Force aircraft: glider, fighter, bomber, airliner, amphibian, flying boat and helicopter. During the Second World War, he flew many types of captured German, Italian, and Japanese aircraft, including new jet and rocket aircraft. He was a pioneer of jet technology into the postwar era.

In 1942 he married Evelyn, “Lynn”, and they had a son Glenn. Evelyn died in 1998.

== Early life ==
Brown was born in Hackney, in the East End of London, but was put up for adoption. At this time there were few places for adoption in London but more in Scotland and he was adopted by Euphemia and Robert Brown in Edinburgh. Robert was a former balloon observer and pilot in the Royal Flying Corps (RFC).

Brown's adoptive father later took him to see the 1936 Olympics in Berlin. Hermann Göring had recently announced the existence of the Luftwaffe, and Brown and his father met and were invited to join social gatherings by members of the newly disclosed organisation. At one of these meetings, Ernst Udet, a former First World War fighter ace, was fascinated to make the acquaintance of Brown senior, a former RFC pilot, and offered to take his son Eric up flying with him. Eric eagerly accepted the German's offer and after his arrival at the appointed airfield at Halle, he was soon flying in a two-seat Bücker Jungmann. He recalled the incident nearly 80 years later on the BBC radio programme Desert Island Discs,

You talk about aerobatics – we did every one I think and I was hanging on to my tummy. So, when we landed, and he gave me the fright of my life because we approached upside-down and then he rolled out just in time to land, he said to me as I got out of the cockpit, slapped me between the shoulder-blades, and gave me the old WW1 fighter pilots' greeting, Hals- und Beinbruch, which means broken neck and broken legs but that was their greeting. But he said to me, you'll make a fine fighter pilot – do me two favours: learn to speak German fluently and learn to fly.

During the Olympics, Brown witnessed Hitler shaking hands with Jesse Owens.

In 1937, Brown left the Royal High School in Edinburgh and entered the University of Edinburgh, studying modern languages with an emphasis on German. While there, he joined the university's air unit and received his first formal flying instruction. In February 1938, he returned to Germany under the sponsorship of the Foreign Office, having been invited to attend the 1938 Automobile Exhibition by Udet, by then a Luftwaffe major general. He there saw the demonstration of the Focke-Wulf Fw 61 helicopter flown by Hanna Reitsch before a small crowd inside the Deutschlandhalle. During this visit he met and got to know Reitsch, whom he had also briefly met in 1936.

In the meantime, Brown had been selected to take part as an exchange student at the Schule Schloss Salem, on the banks of Lake Constance, and it was while there that Brown was woken up with a loud knocking on his door one morning in September 1939. Upon opening the door he was met by a woman with the announcement that "our countries are at war". Soon afterwards, Brown was arrested by the SS. After three days' incarceration, they escorted Brown in his MG Magnette sports car to the Swiss border, saying they were allowing him to keep the car because they "had no spares for it".

== Wartime service ==
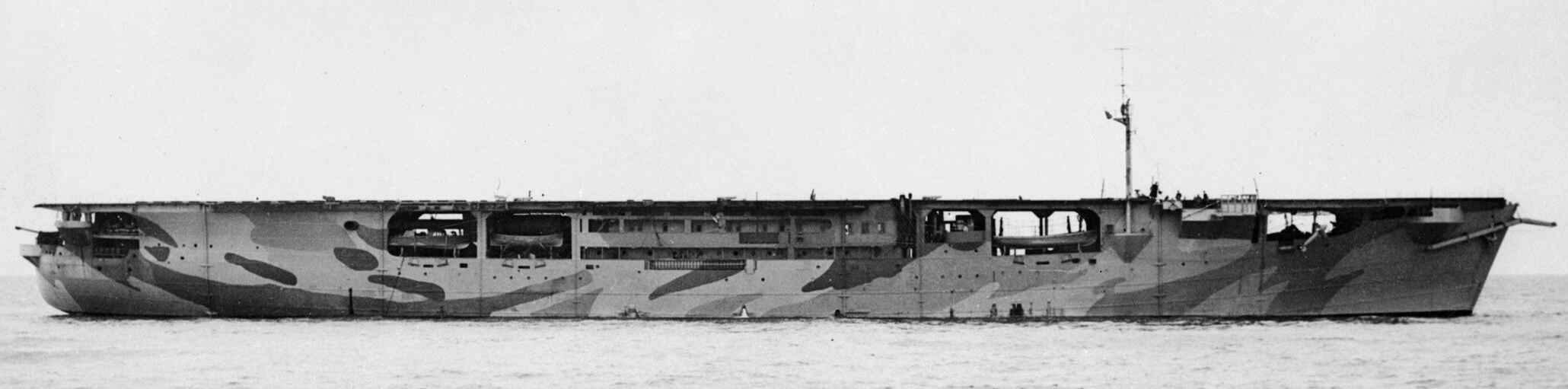
A 1941 image of HMS Audacity after her July 1941 conversion to an escort carrier; Brown served on her with 802 Squadron until the carrier was torpedoed in the Atlantic in December 1941

On returning to a United Kingdom then at war, he joined the Royal Navy Volunteer Reserve as a Fleet Air Arm pilot, where he was posted to 802 Naval Air Squadron, initially serving on the first escort carrier, HMS Audacity, converted and thus named in July 1941. He flew one of the carrier's Grumman Martlets. During his service on board Audacity he shot down two Focke-Wulf Fw 200 Condor maritime patrol aircraft, using head-on attacks to exploit the blind spot in their defensive armament.

Audacity was torpedoed and sunk on 21 December 1941 by the German submarine U-751, commanded by Gerhard Bigalk. The first rescue ship left because of warnings of a nearby U-boat, and Brown was left in the sea overnight with a dwindling band of survivors, until he was rescued the next day. He was one of the two out of 24 to survive hypothermia; the rest succumbed to the cold. Of the complement of 480, 407 survived.

The loss of life was such that 802 Squadron was disbanded until February 1942. On 10 March 1942, Brown was awarded the Distinguished Service Cross for his service on Audacity, in particular "For bravery and skill in action against Enemy aircraft and in the protection of a Convoy against heavy and sustained Enemy attacks".

Following the loss of Audacity, Brown resumed operational flying, being seconded to Royal Canadian Air Force (RCAF) squadrons flying escort operations to USAAF Boeing B-17 Flying Fortress bombers over France. His job was to train them in deck-landing techniques, though the training took place on airfields. (Note: The training was in preparation for the Salerno landings. If the landings had been a failure, the squadrons would have had to be evacuated by carrier.) As a form of quid pro quo he joined them on fighter operations.

Operational once again in 1943, he went back to the Royal Aeronautical Establishment (RAE) this time to perform experimental flying, including batting in the much more experienced Admiralty Test Pilot Lieutenant Commander Roy Sydney Baker-Falkner flying the experimental Fairey Barracuda onto the deck of a carrier in the Clyde. Almost immediately he was transferred to Southern Italy to evaluate captured Regia Aeronautica and Luftwaffe aircraft. This Brown did with almost no tuition, information having to be gleaned from whatever documents were available. On completion of these duties, his commander, being impressed with his performance, sent him back to the RAE with the recommendation that he be employed in the Aerodynamics Flight department at Farnborough. During the first month in the Flight, Brown flew 13 aircraft types, including a captured Focke-Wulf Fw 190.

Brown was posted to the Royal Aircraft Establishment (RAE) at Farnborough, where his experience in deck landings was sought. While there he initially performed testing of the newly navalised Sea Hurricane and Seafire. His aptitude for deck landings led to his posting for the testing of carriers' landing arrangements before they were brought into service. The testing involved multiple combinations of landing point and type of aircraft, with the result being that by the close of 1943 he had performed around 1,500 deck landings on 22 different carriers. In six years at RAE, Brown recalled that he hardly ever took a single day's leave. During carrier compatibility trials, Brown crash-landed a Fairey Firefly Mk I, Z1844, on the deck of HMS Pretoria Castle on 9 September 1943, when the arrestor hook indicator light falsely showed the hook was in the "down" position, compounded by the batsman failing to notice that the hook was not down. The fighter hit the crash barrier, sheared off its undercarriage and shredded the propeller, but he was unhurt.

While at Farnborough as chief naval test pilot, Brown was involved in the deck landing trials of the de Havilland Sea Mosquito, the heaviest aircraft yet flown from a British carrier. Brown landed one for the first time on HMS Indefatigable on 25 March 1944. This was the first operation on a carrier by a twin-engined aircraft for the UK, 2 years after the US B-25 Doolittle Raid in April 1942 which involved takeoffs from an aircraft carrier. (Note: The North American B-25 Mitchell had been flown off a carrier earlier during the attack on Tokyo led by James Doolittle; however the aircraft had been loaded aboard the carrier by crane.) (Note: The Potez 56 made an arrested landing and a subsequent take-off on French aircraft carrier Béarn in March 1936.) The fastest speed for deck landing was 86 knots (159 km/h; 99 mph), while the aircraft's stall speed was 110 knots (200 km/h; 130 mph). He also flew several stints with Fighter Command in the air defence of Great Britain. During this time, in mid-1944, Brown's home was destroyed by a V-1 "Doodlebug" cruise missile, concussing his wife and causing serious injury to their cleaner. At this time, the RAE was the leading authority on high-speed flight and Brown became involved in this sort of testing, flights being flown where the aircraft, usually a Supermarine Spitfire, would be dived at speeds of the high subsonic and near transonic region. Figures achieved by Brown and his colleagues during these tests reached Mach 0.86 for a standard Spitfire MK IX, to Mach 0.92 for a modified Spitfire PR Mk XI flown by his colleague, Squadron Leader Anthony F. Martindale.

=== Assisting the USAAF's Eighth Air Force ===
Together with Brown and Martindale, the RAE Aerodynamics Flight also included two other test pilots, Sqn Ldr James "Jimmy" Nelson and Sqn Ldr Douglas Weightman. During this same period the RAE was approached by USAAF General Jimmy Doolittle with a request for help, as the 8th Air Force had been having trouble when their Lockheed P-38 Lightning, Republic P-47 Thunderbolt and North American P-51 Mustang fighters, providing top cover for the bombers, dived down onto attacking German fighters, some of the diving U.S. fighters encountering speed regions where they became difficult to control.

As a result of Doolittle's request, early in 1944 the P-38H Lightning, a Packard Merlin-powered P-51B Mustang and P-47C Thunderbolt were dived for compressibility testing at the RAE by Brown and several other pilots. The results of the tests were that the tactical Mach numbers, i.e., the manoeuvring limits, were Mach 0.68 for the Lightning and Mach 0.71 for the Thunderbolt; the corresponding figure for both the Fw 190 and Messerschmitt Bf 109 was Mach 0.75, giving them the advantage in a dive. However the tests flown by Brown and his colleagues also gave a Mach number for the Mustang of 0.78, resulting in Doolittle being able to argue with his superiors for the Mustang to be chosen in preference to the P-38 and P-47 for all escort duties from then on, which was available in growing numbers by very early 1944; for Doolittle's eventual move to air supremacy missions permitting the fighters to fly up to 75–100 miles ahead of the bomber combat box formations, instead of requiring them to remain with the bombers at all times.

=== Brown's first encounters with jet flight ===
Brown had been made aware of the British progress in jet propulsion in May 1941 when he had heard of the Gloster E.28/39 after diverting in bad weather to RAF Cranwell during a flight and had subsequently met Frank Whittle when asked to suggest improvements to the jet engine to make it more suitable for naval use. This resulted in the Gloster Meteor being selected as the Royal Navy's first jet fighter, although, as it turned out, few would be used by them. Brown was also selected as the pilot for the Miles M.52 supersonic research aircraft programme, and he flew modified aircraft incorporating components intended for the M.52; however, the post-war government cancelled the project in 1945 with the M.52 almost complete. On 2 May 1944, he was appointed a Member of the Order of the British Empire "for outstanding enterprise and skill in piloting aircraft during hazardous aircraft trials."

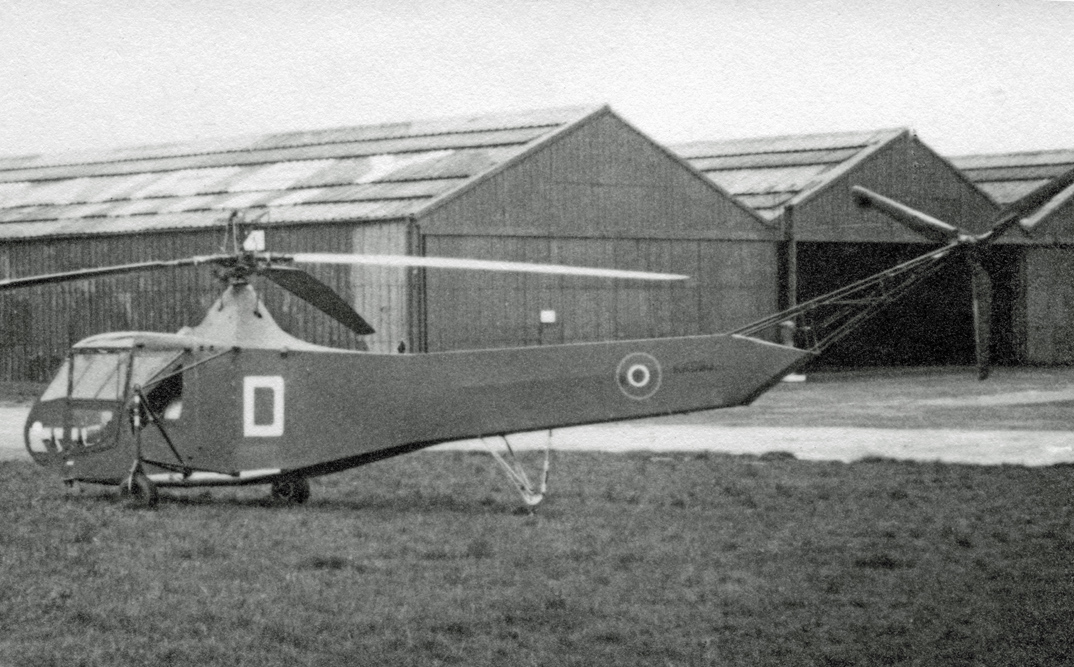
A Royal Air Force Hoverfly I of the type flown by Brown from Speke to Farnborough in 1945

=== Helicopters ===
In February 1945, Brown learned that the Aerodynamics Flight had been allocated three Sikorsky R-4B Hoverfly/Gadfly helicopters. He had never seen one of these machines, so a trip to Farnborough was arranged and Brown had a short flight as a passenger in one. A few days later, Brown and Martindale were sent to RAF Speke to collect two new R-4Bs.

On arrival, they found the American mechanics assembling the machines, and when Brown asked the master sergeant in charge about himself and Martindale being taught to fly them, he was handed a "large orange-coloured booklet" with the retort; "Whaddya mean, bud? – Here's your instructor". Brown and Martindale examined the booklet and after several practice attempts at hovering and controlling the craft, followed by a stiff drink, they set off for Farnborough. Brown and Martindale managed the trip safely, if raggedly, in formation, although sometimes as much as a couple of miles apart.

On 4 April, Brown added another "first" to his logbook when engaged in trials in relation to the flexible deck concept with HMS Pretoria Castle, in which he was supposed to make landing approaches to the escort carrier in a Bell Airacobra, which had been modified with a tail hook. During one of these passes, Brown declared an emergency and was given permission to make a deck landing; a ruse which had previously been agreed with the carrier's captain, Caspar John. Although the landing was achieved without difficulty, the long take off run required for the Airacobra meant that even with the ship steaming at full speed, there was little margin of error. This was the first carrier landing and take off for any aircraft with a tricycle undercarriage.

=== The RAE's "Enemy Flight" ===
With the end of the European war in sight, the RAE prepared itself to acquire German aeronautical technology and aircraft before it was either accidentally destroyed or taken by the Soviets, and, because of his skills in the language, Brown was made the commanding officer of "Operation Enemy Flight". He flew to northern Germany; among the targets for the RAE was the Arado Ar 234, a new jet bomber in which the Allies, particularly the Americans, were very much interested. A number of the jets were based at an airfield in Denmark, the German forces having retreated there. He expected to arrive at a liberated aerodrome, just after it had been taken by the British Army; however, German resistance to the Allied advance meant that the ground forces had been delayed and the airfield was still an operational Luftwaffe base. Luckily for Brown, the commanding officer of the Luftwaffe airfield at Grove offered his surrender and Brown took charge of the airfield and its staff of 2,000 men until Allied forces arrived the next day.

Subsequently, Brown and Martindale, along with several other members of the Aerodynamics Flight and assisted by a co-operative German pilot, later ferried twelve Ar 234s across the North Sea and on to Farnborough. The venture was not without risk, as before their capture, the Germans had destroyed all the engine log books for the aircraft, leaving Brown and his colleagues no idea of the expected engine hours remaining to the machines. Because of the scarcity of the special high-temperature alloys for use in their construction, the Junkers Jumo 004 engines had a life of only 25 hours – it was thus not known whether the engines were brand new or just about to expire.

During this period, Brown was asked by Brigadier Glyn Hughes, the Medical Officer of the British Second Army occupying the newly liberated Bergen-Belsen concentration camp, to help interrogate the former camp commandant and his assistant. Agreeing to do so, he soon interviewed Josef Kramer and Irma Grese, and remarked upon the experience by saying that; "Two more loathsome creatures it is hard to imagine" and further describing the latter as "... the worst human being I have ever met." Kramer and Grese were later tried and hanged for war crimes.

== Post-war career ==
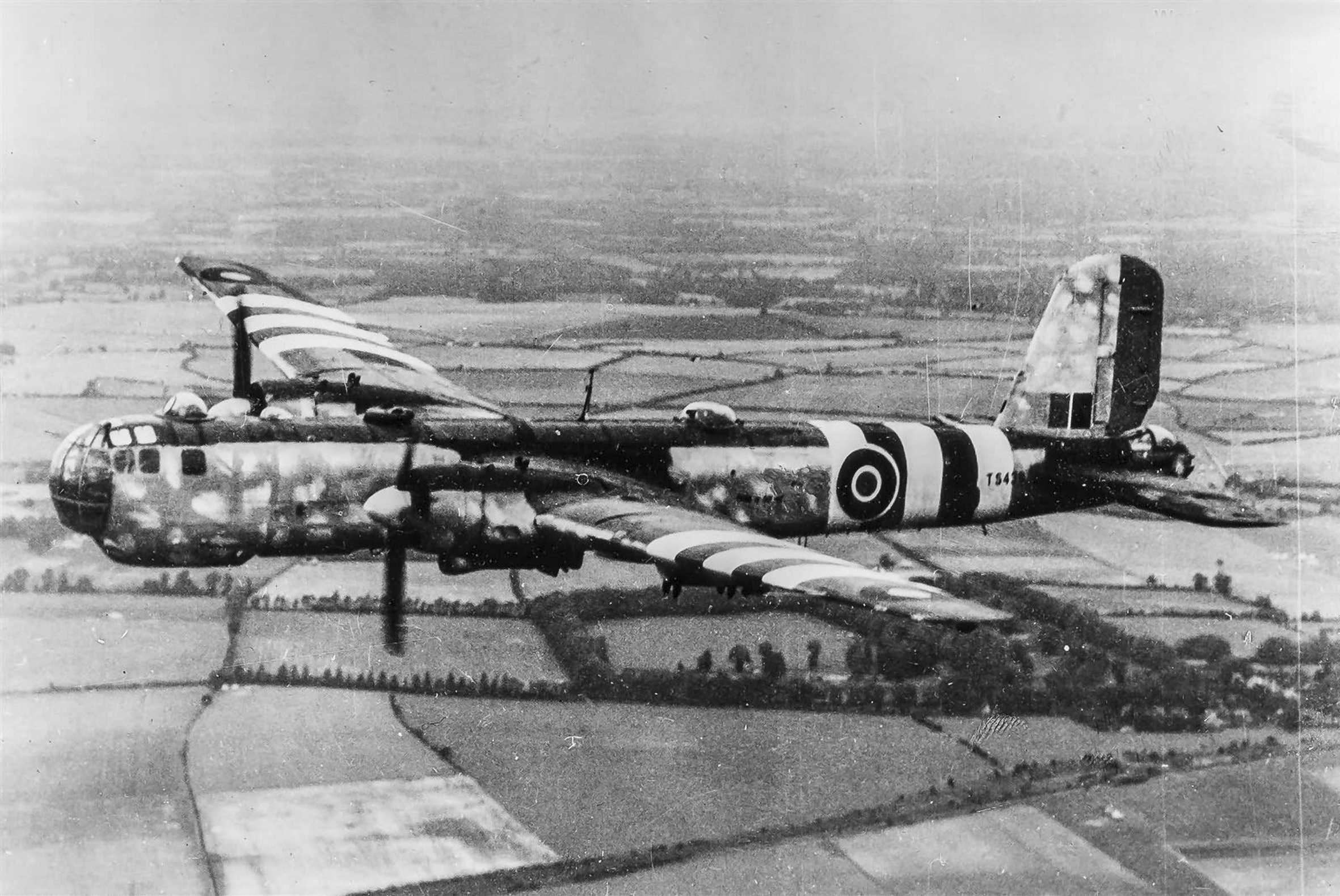
The captured Heinkel He 177 A-5 variant in British markings flown by Brown at Farnborough in September 1944

After the Second World War‚ Brown commanded the Enemy Aircraft Flight, an elite group of pilots who test-flew captured German and Italian aircraft. That experience rendered Brown one of the few men to have been qualified to compare both Allied and Axis aeroplanes as they flew during the war. He flight-tested 53 German aircraft, including the Messerschmitt Me 163 Komet rocket fighter. That Komet is now on display at the National Museum of Flight near Edinburgh. His flight test of this rocket plane, the only one by an Allied pilot using the rocket motor, was accomplished unofficially: it was deemed to be almost suicidal due to the notoriously dangerous hypergolic C-Stoff fuel and T-Stoff oxidizer combination. Commenting to a newspaper in September 2015 he recalled,

To me it was the most exciting thing on the horizon, a totally new experience. I remember watching the ground crew very carefully before take-off, wondering if they thought they were waving goodbye to me forever or whether they thought this thing was going to return. The noise it made was absolutely thunderous and it was like being in charge of a runaway train; everything changed so rapidly and I really had to have my wits about me.

Brown flight-tested all three of the German jet designs to see front-line action in the war: the Messerschmitt Me 262A Schwalbe and the Arado Ar 234B Blitz, both these types powered by twin Junkers Jumo 004 engines, and the single-engined BMW 003-powered Heinkel He 162A Spatz turbojet combat aircraft. He would later fly the He 162A at the Farnborough Air Show, and described it as having the best controls of any aircraft he had ever flown but as being difficult to handle. One of his colleagues at Farnborough died testing the aircraft type.

Fluent in German, Brown helped interview many Germans after the Second World War, including Wernher von Braun and Hermann Göring, Willy Messerschmitt, Ernst Heinkel and Kurt Tank. He described the interviews as being minimal, due to the need to begin the Nuremberg trials, and limited to matters related to aviation.

Brown was using Himmler's personal aircraft, a specially converted Focke-Wulf Fw 200 Condor that had been captured and was being used by the RAE Flight based at the former Luftwaffe airfield at Schleswig. He was also able to renew acquaintance with German pilot Hanna Reitsch. She had been arrested after the German surrender in 1945. Fearing the approaching Russians, her father had killed her mother, sister and then himself.

As an RAE test pilot he was involved in the wartime Miles M.52 supersonic project, test flying a Spitfire fitted with the M.52's all moving tail, diving from high altitude to achieve high subsonic speeds. He was due to fly the M.52 in 1946, but this fell through when the project was cancelled. The all moving tail information, however, supplied upon instruction from the British government ostensibly as part of an information exchange with the Americans (although no information was ever received in return), allowed Bell to modify its XS-1 for true transsonic pitch controllability, in turn allowing Chuck Yeager to become the first man to exceed Mach 1 in 1947.

If the Ministry of Supply had proceeded with Ralph Smith's V2-based Megaroc sub-orbital crewed spacecraft, Brown would also have been the leading candidate for its projected 1949 first crewed spaceflight.

In a throwback to his days testing aircraft in high speed dives, while at the RAE, Brown performed similar testing of the Avro Tudor airliner. The requirement was to determine the safe limiting speed for the aircraft and to gather data on high-speed handling of large civil aircraft in preparation for a projected four-jet version of the Tudor. Flying from 32,000 ft, in a succession of dives to speeds initially to Mach 0.6, he succeeded in diving the Tudor up to Mach 0.7, an unusual figure for such a large piston-engined aeroplane, this figure being dictated by the pilot's discretion, as pulling the aircraft out of the dive had required the combined efforts of Brown and his second pilot. The Tudor was not a success. The planned jet version of the Tudor later became the Avro Ashton.

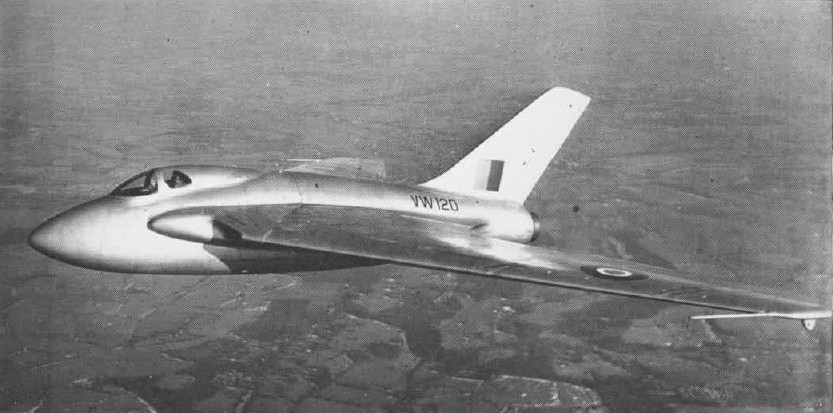
The high-speed DH 108 VW120 that Brown flew. This aircraft later crashed, killing Brown's successor at the RAE, Sqn Ldr Stuart Muller-Rowland.

In 1949, he test flew a modified (strengthened and control-boosted) de Havilland DH.108, after a crash in a similar aircraft while diving at speeds approaching the sound barrier had killed Geoffrey de Havilland, Jr., Brown initially started his tests from a height of 35,000 ft, rising to 45,000 ft and during a dive from the latter he achieved a Mach number of 0.985. It was only when attempting the tests from the same height as de Havilland, 4,000 ft, that he discovered that in a Mach 0.88 dive from that altitude the aircraft suffered from a high-g pitch oscillation at several hertz (Hz). "The ride was smooth, then suddenly it all went to pieces ... as the plane porpoised wildly my chin hit my chest, jerked hard back, slammed forward again, repeated it over and over, flogged by the awful whipping of the plane ...". Remembering the drill he had often practised, Brown managed to pull back gently on both stick and throttle and the motion; "... ceased as quickly as it had started". He believed that he survived the test flight partly because he was a shorter man, de Havilland having suffered a broken neck possibly due to the violent oscillation.

Test instrumentation on Brown's flight recorded during the oscillations accelerations of +4 and −3 Gs at 3 Hz. Brown described the DH 108 as; "A killer. Nasty stall. Vicious undamped longitudinal oscillation at speed in bumps". All three DH 108 aircraft were lost in fatal accidents.

In 1948, Brown was awarded the Boyd Trophy for his work in trials for the rubber deck landing system. On 30 March 1949, he was granted a permanent Royal Navy commission as a lieutenant, with seniority backdated to his original wartime promotion to the rank.

On 12 August 1949, he was testing the third of three Saunders-Roe SR.A/1 jet-powered flying-boat fighter prototypes, TG271, when he struck submerged debris, which resulted in the aircraft sinking in the Solent off Cowes, Isle of Wight. He was pulled unconscious from the cockpit of the wrecked aircraft by the Saunders-Roe test pilot Geoffrey Tyson, having been knocked out in the crash. He was promoted lieutenant commander on 1 April 1951, commander on 31 December 1953 and captain on 31 December 1960.

Brown was responsible for at least three important firsts in carrier aviation: the first carrier landing using an aircraft equipped with a tricycle undercarriage (the Bell Airacobra Mk 1 AH574) on the trials carrier HMS Pretoria Castle on 4 April 1945; the first landing of a twin-engined aircraft on a carrier (the Mosquito) on HMS Indefatigable on 25 March 1944; and the world's first carrier landing of a jet aircraft, landing the prototype de Havilland Vampire LZ551/G on the Royal Navy carrier HMS Ocean on 3 December 1945. For this work with the Mosquito and the Vampire he was later appointed an Officer of the Order of the British Empire.

In the 1950s during the Korean War, Brown was seconded as an exchange officer for two years to Naval Air Station Patuxent River, Maryland, US where he flew a number of American aircraft, including 36 types of helicopter. In January 1952, it was while at Patuxent River that Brown demonstrated the steam catapult to the Americans, flying a Grumman Panther off the carrier HMS Perseus while the ship was tied up to the dock at the Philadelphia Naval Yard. It had been planned for Brown to make the first catapult launch with the ship under way and steaming into any wind; however, the wind on the day was so slight that British officials decided that, as the new steam catapult was capable of launching an aircraft without any wind, they would risk their pilot (Brown) if the Americans would risk their aircraft. The launch was a success and US carriers would later feature the steam catapult.

It was around the same time that another British invention was being offered to the US, the angled flight deck, and Brown once again was called upon to promote the concept. Whether due to Brown or not, the first US aircraft carrier modified with the new flight deck, USS Antietam, was ready less than nine months later.

In 1954, Brown, by then a Commander in the Royal Navy, became Commander (Air) of RNAS Brawdy, where he remained until returning to West Germany in late 1957, becoming Chief of British Naval Mission to Germany, his brief being to re-establish German naval aviation after its pre-war integration with and subornation to, the Luftwaffe. During this period Brown worked closely with Admiral Gerhard Wagner of the German Naval Staff. Training was conducted initially in the UK on Hawker Sea Hawks and Fairey Gannets, and during this time Brown was allocated a personal Percival Pembroke aircraft by the Marineflieger, which, to his surprise, the German maintenance personnel took great pride in. It was the first exclusively naval aircraft the German Navy had owned since the 1930s. Brown led the re-emergence of naval aviation in Germany to the point that in 1960 Marineflieger squadrons were integrated into NATO.

Later Brown enjoyed a three-month period as a test pilot for the Focke-Wulf company, helping them out until they could find a replacement after the company's previous test pilot had been detained due to having relatives in East Germany.

In the 1960s, due to his considerable experience of carrier aviation, Brown, while working at the Admiralty as deputy director of Naval Air Warfare, was consulted on the flight deck arrangement of the planned new UK class of aircraft carrier, the CVA-01; the project was cancelled in 1966.

In September 1967 came his last appointment in the Royal Navy when, as a captain, he took command of HMS Fulmar, then the Royal Naval Air Station (from 1972 back with the RAF), Lossiemouth, until March 1970. He was appointed a naval aide de camp to Queen Elizabeth II on 7 July 1969 and appointed a Commander of the Order of the British Empire in the 1970 New Year Honours. He relinquished his appointment as naval ADC on 27 January 1970 and retired from the Royal Navy later in 1970.

== Records ==
Brown flew aircraft from Britain, the United States, Germany, the Soviet Union, Italy and Japan and is listed in the Guinness Book of World Records as holding the record for flying the greatest number of different aircraft. The official record is 487, but includes only basic types. For example, Brown flew 14 versions of the Spitfire and Seafire and although these versions are very different they appear only once in the list. This list includes only aircraft flown by Brown as "Captain in Command".

Because of the special circumstances involved, Brown did not think that this record would ever be topped.

He also held the world record for the most carrier landings, 2,407, partly compiled in testing the arrestor wires on more than 20 aircraft carriers during the Second World War.

== Credits ==
In his book Wings on My Sleeve, Brown records his admiration of his colleagues:-

I was fortunate to have such fine C.O.s as Alan Hards, Dick Ubee, Silyn Roberts and Allen Wheeler. ... It was always a thrill to me to meet and talk flying business with men like Geoffrey Tyson, Harald Penrose, Jeffrey Quill, Mutt Summers, Bill Pegg and George Errington. All these had been heroes in my private hall of fame long before I knew them personally. ... Geoffrey de Havilland, Bill Humble and Alex Henshaw ... They were men of great dash ... Mike Lithgow, Peter Twiss, John Cunningham of Comet fame, John Derry, Neville Duke and Roland Beamont.

Brown goes on to mention the pilot of the first jet flight in Britain, Gerry Sayer, then the aircraft designers R. J. Mitchell (designer of the Spitfire), Sir Sydney Camm, R. E. Bishop, Roy Chadwick and Joe Smith, followed by the names of what he describes as "boffins and boffinettes", which include the brilliant aerodynamicists Morien Morgan, Handel Davies, Dai Morris and P. A. Hufton, and the "boffinettes" like aerodynamicist Gwen Alston, Anne Burns (structural engineer), Dorothy Pearse (aircraft engineer) and Pauline Gower (head of the women's section of the Air Transport Auxiliary (ATA).

Brown's last credits mention Lewis Boddington, Dr. Thomlinson, John Noble and Charles Crowfoot, whom he records (with "others") as being responsible for "giving the Royal Navy a technical lead in aircraft carrier equipment which it still holds to this day [1978]." He ends this section: "These men and women were civil servants, but they worked hours, took responsibility, and produced results far beyond what their country paid them for. To me they represent the true measure of Britain's greatness."

== Books ==
Brown wrote several books about his experiences, including ones describing the flight characteristics of the various aircraft he flew and an autobiography, Wings on My Sleeve, first published in 1961 and considerably updated in later editions. Other books were Wings of the Luftwaffe, Wings of the Weird and Wonderful, and Miles M.52 (with Dennis Bancroft). He was also the author of dozens of articles in aviation magazines and journals.

His best-known series of articles is "Viewed from the Cockpit", which was published (and occasionally re-published) in the journal Air International. Flight review highlights in this series have included the following types:

- Dornier Do 217
- Fairey Swordfish
- Fairey Fulmar
- Fairey Spearfish, a prototype torpedo bomber (1947) which Brown did not enjoy
- Fairey Barracuda, which Brown found lacklustre and somewhat disappointing
- Focke-Wulf Fw 190 A and D Series.
- Grumman F9F Panther and Grumman F-9 Cougar, which Brown found (on initial models) somewhat underpowered
- Hawker Sea Fury
- Hawker Sea Hurricane
- Heinkel He 111
- Junkers Ju 87D Stuka
- Supermarine Seafire, various marks.
- Messerschmitt Bf 109 E (Emil) and G (Gustav) – Brown flew the G-12 training sub-type from the rear cockpit and nearly crashed because of poor visibility from that position.
- Messerschmitt Me 163 Komet. Brown was one of few pilots to successfully fly one of these, having signed a disclaimer for the German ground crew.
- Messerschmitt Me 262 Schwalbe.
- Heinkel He 177 Greif bomber

As regards his preferences Brown states:

My favourite in the piston engine (era) is the de Havilland Hornet. For the simple reason it was over-powered. This is an unusual feature in an aircraft, you could do anything on one engine, almost, that you could do on two. It was a 'hot rod Mosquito' really, I always described it as like flying a Ferrari in the sky.

On the jet side I was a great admirer of the F-86 Sabre, but in particular, the Model E (F-86E) which had the flying tail, and this gave me what I call the 'perfect harmony of control'. If a pilot has this perfect harmony of control you feel you're part of the aeroplane and you're bonded with it really. You've got into it and the aeroplane welcomes you and says 'thank God you've come, you're part of me anyway' and to fly like that is a sheer delight.

== Later life ==
Brown served as president of the Royal Aeronautical Society from 1982 to 1983. His last flight as a pilot was in 1994, but in 2015 he was still lecturing and regularly attending the British Rocketry Oral History Programme (BROHP), where the annual presentation of the Sir Arthur Clarke Awards takes place. In 2007 he was the recipient of their Lifetime Achievement Award.

Brown lived, in semi-retirement, at Copthorne, West Sussex. He had married Evelyn (Lynn) Macrory in 1942. She died in 1998. He was interviewed many times, most recently by BBC Radio 4 at his home in April 2013.

In June 2014, he was the subject of the hour-long BBC Two documentary Britain's Greatest Pilot: The Extraordinary Story of Captain Winkle Brown.

In November 2014, he was the guest for the 3,000th edition of BBC Radio 4's Desert Island Discs. During the programme, the 95-year-old said that he still enjoyed driving and had just bought himself a new sports car. His musical choices included "At Last" by the Glenn Miller Orchestra and "Amazing Grace" by the Royal Scots Dragoon Guards. His favourite was "Stardust" by Artie Shaw and His Orchestra.

On 24 February 2015, Brown delivered the University of Edinburgh Mountbatten Lecture, entitled "Britain's Defence in the Near Future".

In May 2015, Brown was awarded the Founder's Medal by the Air League. This was presented to him by the patron, the Duke of Edinburgh at the annual reception held at St James's Palace "for his amazing flying achievements and involvement with aviation during a remarkable lifetime." Brown died peacefully aged 96 on 21 February 2016 at East Surrey Hospital in Redhill, Surrey after a short illness. His funeral was a private ceremony at Surrey and Sussex Crematorium, in Crawley, where mourners included the First Sea Lord Admiral Sir George Zambellas and other military representatives.

== Nickname ==
Brown received the affectionate nickname "Winkle" from his Royal Navy colleagues. Short for "Periwinkle", a small mollusc, the name was given to Brown because of his short stature of 5 ft 7 in (1.70 m).

== Honours and awards ==

Order of the British Empire; Military Division (Commander)	Distinguished Service Cross		Air Force Cross
1939–45 Star	Atlantic Star	Defence Medal with King's Commendation for Valuable Service in the Air	War Medal 1939–1945 with Mention in Despatches

- 10 March 1942 Temporary Sub-Lieutenant (A) Eric Melrose Brown RNVR of HMS Audacity is awarded the Distinguished Service Cross (DSC) in particular "For bravery and skill in action against Enemy aircraft and in the protection of a Convoy against heavy and sustained Enemy attacks".
- 2 May 1944 Temporary Lieutenant (A) Eric Melrose Brown, DSC, RNVR is appointed Member of the Order of the British Empire "for outstanding enterprise and skill in piloting aircraft during hazardous flight trials."
- 19 February 1946 Temporary Acting Lieutenant Commander (A) Eric Melrose Brown, MBE, DSC, RNVR is appointed Officer of the Order of the British Empire "For courage, exceptional skill and devotion to duty in carrying out the first deck-landings of Mosquito and Vampire. In doing so he has been the first pilot ever to land on the deck of a carrier, a twin-engined aircraft (Mosquito) and a pure jet-propelled aircraft (Vampire). The success of these great strides in Naval Aviation has been largely due to his exceptional flying skill".
- 6 June 1947 Lieutenant Commander Eric Brown OBE DSC is awarded the Air Force Cross
- 1 January 1949 Lieutenant Commander E. M. Brown, OBE, DSC, AFC is awarded at the King's Commendation for Valuable Service in the Air
- 1 January 1970 Captain Eric Melrose Brown, OBE, DSC, AFC, Royal Navy is appointed a Commander of the Order of the British Empire.
- 3 July 2018 – statue of Eric Brown unveiled at Edinburgh Airport.

== See also ==
- No. 1426 Flight RAF
- Air Fighting Development Unit (AFDU)

== Notes ==
Notes

Citations

Professional and academic associations
Preceded by	President of the Royal Aeronautical Society; 1982–1983	Succeeded by
