= Sydney Richard Ubee =

Sydney Richard Ubee, CB, AFC, (1903–1998), Air Vice-Marshal.

In his book "Wings on my sleeve" (page 157 et seq), Eric Brown records his admiration of a number of erstwhile colleagues who deserve recognition:- "I was fortunate to have such fine C.O.s as Alan Hards, Dick Ubee, Silyn Roberts, and Alan[sic] Wheeler"

Sitter in 4 portraits, and Photographs (one by Elliott & Fry 1951) in the National Portrait Gallery Collection ref:NPG x91562, NPG x86064 and NPG x100225.

Mentioned in THE LONDON GAZETTE, 4 APRIL, 1933 2289

1 October, 1937;

7 June, 1940; and 23 July, 1929.

The Supermarine Walrus was the first amphibious aircraft in the world to be launched by catapult with a full military load, piloted by Flight Lieutenant Sydney Richard Ubee.

Ubee was awarded the Air Force Cross (AFC), posted in The London Gazette Supplement for 2 January 1939.

Ubee was made a Companion of the Order of the Bath in the 1952 New Year Honours
