= Joan Bridge =

British costume designer (1912–2009)

- Born: 13 March 1909; Derbyshire, England
- Died: 8 December 2009 (aged 100); Totteridge, London, England
- Occupations: Costume designer Technicolor consultant
- Years active: 1938–1980

Joan Alice Bridge (13 March 1909 – 8 December 2009) was a British Technicolor consultant and costume designer. She was particularly known for her longstanding collaboration with fellow costume designer Elizabeth Haffenden on many notable film productions in the 1960s and 1970s. Her accolades include an Academy Award and a BAFTA Award.

== Early years ==
Born on 13 March 1909 at Ripley, Derbyshire, Joan Bridge was the daughter of Harry Newton Bridge, a General Secretary in a Cooperative Society, and Alice Bridge.

Joan Bridge studied art at Birmingham University but was urged by her father to take a teacher training qualification, claiming she would never be able to make a living out of art.

== Career ==
=== Colour consultant ===
In 1939, Joan Bridge was a colour adviser on the only feature film to be made in Dufaycolor, Sons of the Sea. During World War Two, Natalie Kalmus, Technicolor’s head of colour control was absent from Great Britain and Joan Bridge was the colour adviser on British wartime Technicolor productions. Natalie Kalmus returned in November 1945. Notwithstanding, Kalmus enjoys a credit on these wartime films as part of her contract with Technicolor. The two women shared British Technicolor production credits until 1949 after which Joan Bride had sole credit. Film historian Sarah Street has commented on the different experiences of the two women: Bridge's work was admired by cinematographers such as Oswald Morris who had not "accorded Kalmus the same courtesy", in fact she was met with hostility; it is likely that Bridge's personality and nationality helped to avoid the criticism experienced by her colleague in British studios. Street concludes "there is no doubt that the combination of Kalmus and Bridge assisted Technicolor in Britain, a record that has won begrudging recognition over the years".

Bridge's role drew her into a large number of productions, and she worked on up to six films per year in the late 1940s. Cecil Beaton, who worked with Joan Bridge on An Ideal Husband (1947), somewhat dismissively described her as "a color expert, run[ning] about with odd microscopic pieces of material and a lot of shop talk". Nevertheless, the costume designer did change a yellow dress planned for a pink boudoir scene when Bridge questioned the harmonisation of colours.

Frequent collaborators in this period were directors Michael Powell and Emeric Pressburger, which whom Bridge worked six times: The Life and Death of Colonel Blimp (1943-uncredited), A Matter of Life and Death (1946), Black Narcissus (1947), The Red Shoes (1948), Gone to Earth (1950) and The Tales of Hoffman (1951).

Joan Bridge's colour direction or colour consultant credits in the 1950s include such acclaimed films as Moulin Rouge (1952), The Ladykillers (1955), and Invitation to the Dance (1956). Altogether, she is credited in over 100 three-strip Technicolor movies, including the last to be filmed using this technique: The Feminine Touch (1956). She is credited as a colour consultant in a handful of films in the late 1950s including Richard III (1955) and Ben Hur (1959). In the latter, she collaborated with the costume designer Elizabeth Haffenden.

=== Costume designer ===
Joan Bridge had first met Elizabeth Haffenden while working at Gainsborough Studios in the 1940s. They had a successful partnership in costume design throughout the 1960s and 70s. Between 1958 and her retirement, Bridge is credited with creating the costumes for more than 20 different productions.

Interviewed for The Scotsman during the production of The Prime of Miss Jean Brodie in 1968, Bridge explained the importance of colour in costume work, stating that the camera did lie, and that the hue of clothes changed once seen on films. She described the "wonderful greyness" of the city's "grey buildings under grey skies" had been used in the checked tweeds of Miss Brodie's cape and the girls' school uniforms.

Bridge and Haffenden's first formal collaboration was Ben Hur (1959), although Bridge was not awarded a co-designer credit for the film's Oscar-winning designs. Bridge was credited on following collaborations, and the pair received a BAFTA nomination for colour costume design for The Amorous Adventures of Moll Flanders (1965), for their research-based costumes described as "fabulous and eye-catching" by critics.

Haffenden and Bridge were frequent collaborators with director Fred Zinnemann. They worked on five films for Zinnemann, across a range of periods and locations that required thoughtful costuming, including The Sundowners (1960), set in 1920s Australia, the Spanish-set Behold a Pale Horse (1964), Tudor drama A Man for All Seasons (1966) and the recent history of Day of the Jackal (1973). Interviewed during production of Behold a Pale Horse, Bridge said that the secret of dressing male stars was to make them appear as "un-actorish as possible", and used the example of Gregory Peck's tailor-made clothes for the film being distressed and broken down to appear at least 15 years old. Bridge and Haffenden explained their joint work as "developing the characters by subtle ways, with the clothes they wear... it's not just a case of finding pretty outfits for everyone".

On more theatrical projects, Bridge and Haffenden were recognised for their bright colours and inventive wit. While creating the costumes for Chitty Chitty Bang Bang (1968) in London, Bridge and Haffenden used hundreds of faux-military medals popular in teenage fashion of the time to emulate the pompous regalia of the fictional state of Vulgaria.

On her retirement from the film industry in 1980, Bridge moved to Totteridge and became a member of South Herts Golf Club where she was an active player into her nineties.

== Selected filmography ==
Year	Title	Director	Notes
1964	Behold a Pale Horse	Fred Zinnemann	with Elizabeth Haffenden
1965	The Amorous Adventures of Moll Flanders	Terence Young	with Elizabeth Haffenden
1965	The Liquidator	Jack Cardiff	with Elizabeth Haffenden
1966	A Man for All Seasons	Fred Zinnemann	with Elizabeth Haffenden
1967	Half a Sixpence	George Sidney	with Elizabeth Haffenden
1968	Chitty Chitty Bang Bang	Ken Hughes	with Elizabeth Haffenden
1969	The Prime of Miss Jean Brodie	Ronald Neame	with Elizabeth Haffenden
1971	Fiddler on the Roof	Norman Jewison	with Elizabeth Haffenden
1972	Pope Joan	Michael Anderson	with Elizabeth Haffenden
1973	The Day of the Jackal	Fred Zinnemann	with Elizabeth Haffenden
1973	The Homecoming	Peter Hall	with Elizabeth Haffenden
1974	Luther	Guy Green	with Elizabeth Haffenden
1975	Conduct Unbecoming	Michael Anderson	with Elizabeth Haffenden
1977	Julia	Fred Zinnemann	Wardrobe designer
1979	Hanover Street	Peter Hyams	

== Awards and nominations ==
Award	Year (Note: Indicates the year of ceremony. Each year is linked to the article about the awards held that year, wherever possible.)	Category	Work	Result	Ref.
Academy Awards	1967	Best Costume Design – Color	A Man for All Seasons	Won	
British Academy Film Awards	1966	Best British Costume Design – Colour	The Amorous Adventures of Moll Flanders	Nominated	
British Academy Film Awards	1968	Best British Costume Design – Colour	A Man for All Seasons	Won	
British Academy Film Awards	1968	Best British Costume Design – Colour	Half a Sixpence	Nominated	
British Academy Film Awards	1979	Best Costume Design	Julia	Nominated	
