= Elizabeth Haffenden =

British costume designer (1906–1976)

- Born: 18 April 1906; Croydon, Surrey, England
- Died: 29 May 1976 (aged 70); London, England
- Occupation: Costume designer
- Years active: 1934–1975

Elizabeth Haffenden (18 April 1906 – 29 May 1976) was a British costume designer. She was best known for creating the costumes for most of the Gainsborough melodramas in the 1940s and for her longstanding collaboration with Joan Bridge on many notable film productions in latter years. Her accolades include two Academy Awards and a BAFTA Award.

== Life and career ==
Elizabeth Haffenden was born in Croydon to wholesale draper James Wilson-Haffenden and Edith Carruthers. Elizabeth Haffenden trained at Croydon School of Art and the Royal College of Art. After working as a commercial artist she entered theatre costume design working with Laurence Irving.

Haffenden's first film costume designs were for Colonel Blood (1933, working alongside art directors Laurence Irving and John Bryan. In 1939 she joined Gaumont British film studios, and from 1942–1949 she was in charge of the costume department for the popular cycle of Gainsborough melodramas, produced at Shepherds Bush. These included The Man in Grey (1943) and The Wicked Lady (1945). Costume historian Pam Cook has described Haffenden's Gainsborough projects as "visually splendid ... and the company promoted several of the films on the basis of their costumes". Haffenden's designs for Caravan (1944) and The Wicked Lady (1945) anticipated the post-war new look fashion style, and offered "extravagant sexual display" through low cut bodices and translucent fabrics. Costumes from The Wicked Lady were acquired for the collections of the Victoria and Albert Museum.

In the 1950s Haffenden worked as resident costume designer for the British branch of MGM-British studios, Elstree.

From the late 1950s Haffenden worked as a freelance costume designer with Joan Bridge, who had worked as a Technicolor consultant at Gainsborough in 1946, where the pair met. Haffenden and Bridge worked together on period dramas, comedies and thrillers, starting with Ben Hur (1959), which won the Academy Award for Best Costume Design.

Haffenden and Bridge were frequent collaborators with director Fred Zinnemann. They worked on five films for Zinnemann, across a range of periods and locations that required thoughtful costuming, including The Sundowners (1960), set in 1920s Australia, the Spanish-set Behold a Pale Horse (1964), Tudor drama A Man for All Seasons (1966) and the recent history of Day of the Jackal (1973).

Haffenden and Bridge were jointly nominated for British Academy of Film and Television Awards (BAFTA) for The Amorous Adventures of Moll Flanders (1965) and Half a Sixpence (1967), and were awarded a BAFTA and Oscar for A Man for All Seasons (1966).

In subsequent decades Haffenden and Bridge designed costumes for notable films including The Prime of Miss Jean Brodie (1968) and Fiddler on the Roof (1971).

Haffenden died in London on 29 May 1976, while she was prepping costumes for the film Julia.

== Filmography ==
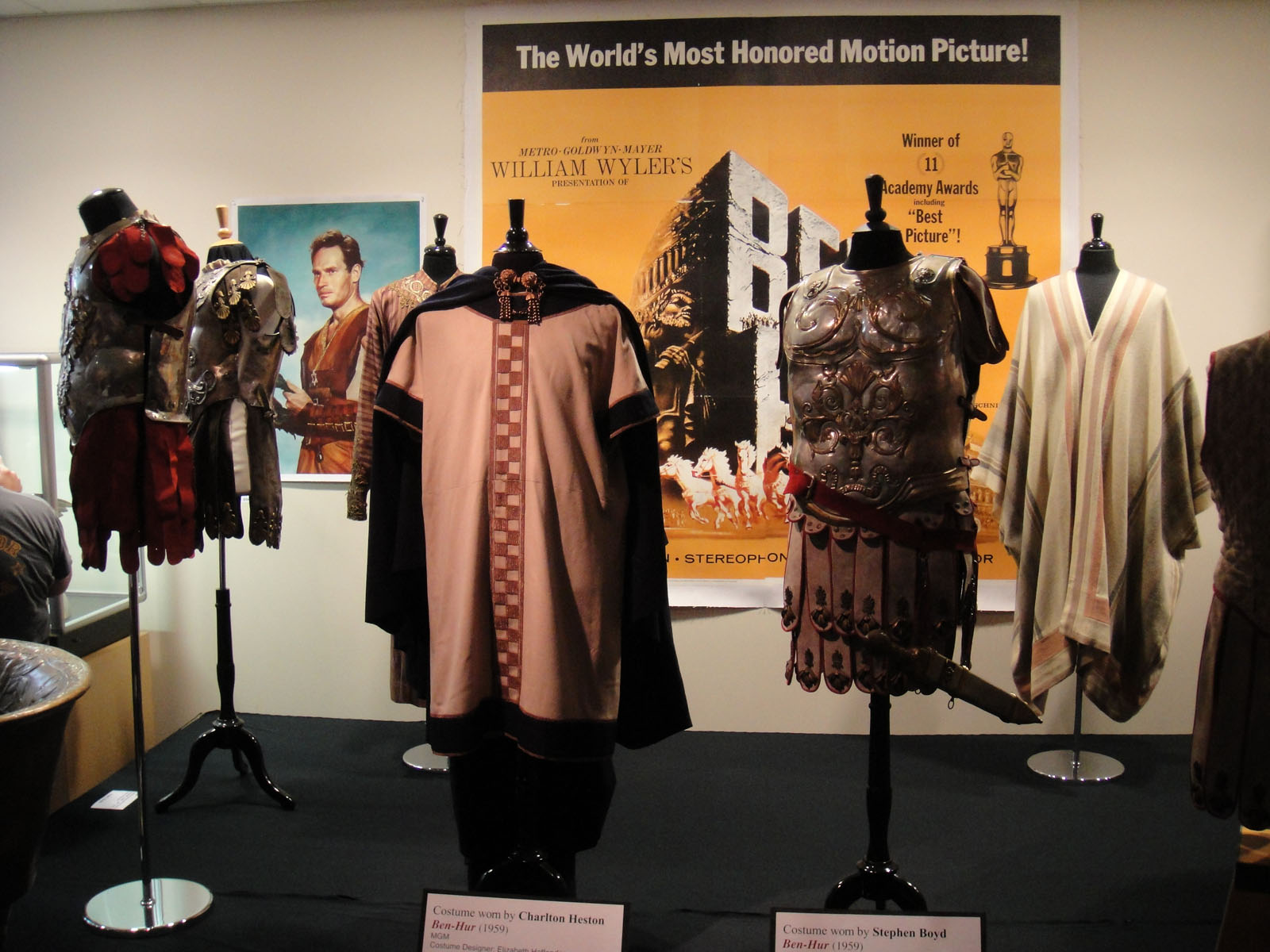
Costumes from Ben-Hur (1959)

Year	Title	Director	Notes
1936	The Last Waltz	Leo Mittler	
1942	The Young Mr. Pitt	Carol Reed	
1943	The Man in Grey	Leslie Arliss	
1943	Dear Octopus	Harold French	
1944	Fanny by Gaslight	Anthony Asquith	
1944	Give Us the Moon	Val Guest	
1944	Two Thousand Women	Frank Launder	
1944	Love Story	Leslie Arliss	
1945	Madonna of the Seven Moons	Arthur Crabtree	
1945	A Place of One's Own	Bernard Knowles	
1945	I'll Be Your Sweetheart	Val Guest	
1945	The Wicked Lady	Leslie Arliss	
1946	Caravan	Arthur Crabtree	
1946	Bedelia	Lance Comfort	
1946	The Magic Bow	Bernard Knowles	
1947	The Man Within	Bernard Knowles	
1947	Jassy	Bernard Knowles	
1947	Uncle Silas	Charles Frank	
1948	Call of the Blood	John Clements; Ladislao Vajda	
1948	The First Gentleman	Alberto Cavalcanti	
1949	The Bad Lord Byron	David MacDonald	
1949	Christopher Columbus	David MacDonald	
1949	The Spider and the Fly	Robert Hamer	Haffenden only designed costumes for Nadia Gray
1950	So Long at the Fair	Terence Fisher; Antony Darnborough	
1950	Portrait of Clare	Lance Comfort	
1951	The Late Edwina Black	Maurice Elvey	
1953	Laughing Anne	Herbert Wilcox	
1954	Beau Brummell	Curtis Bernhardt	
1955	The Dark Avenger	Henry Levin	
1955	Footsteps in the Fog	Arthur Lubin	Haffenden only designed costumes for Stewart Granger
1956	Bhowani Junction	George Cukor	
1956	Moby Dick	John Huston	
1957	Heaven Knows, Mr. Allison	John Huston	
1958	Davy	Michael Relph	
1958	Carve Her Name with Pride	Lewis Gilbert	Haffenden only designed costumes for Virginia McKenna
1958	I Accuse!	José Ferrer	
1959	Ben-Hur	William Wyler	
1960	The Sundowners	Fred Zinnemann	
1962	I Thank a Fool	Robert Stevens	
1964	Behold a Pale Horse	Fred Zinnemann	with Joan Bridge
1965	The Amorous Adventures of Moll Flanders	Terence Young	with Joan Bridge
1965	The Liquidator	Jack Cardiff	with Joan Bridge
1966	A Man for All Seasons	Fred Zinnemann	with Joan Bridge
1967	Half a Sixpence	George Sidney	with Joan Bridge
1968	Chitty Chitty Bang Bang	Ken Hughes	with Joan Bridge
1969	The Prime of Miss Jean Brodie	Ronald Neame	with Joan Bridge
1971	Fiddler on the Roof	Norman Jewison	with Joan Bridge
1972	Pope Joan	Michael Anderson	with Joan Bridge
1973	The Day of the Jackal	Fred Zinnemann	with Joan Bridge
1973	The Homecoming	Peter Hall	with Joan Bridge
1974	Luther	Guy Green	with Joan Bridge
1975	Conduct Unbecoming	Michael Anderson	with Joan Bridge

== Awards and nominations ==
Award	Year (Note: Indicates the year of ceremony. Each year is linked to the article about the awards held that year, wherever possible.)	Category	Work	Result	Ref.
Academy Awards	1960	Best Costume Design – Color	Ben-Hur	Won	
Academy Awards	1967	Best Costume Design – Color	A Man for All Seasons	Won	
British Academy Film Awards	1966	Best British Costume Design – Colour	The Amorous Adventures of Moll Flanders	Nominated	
British Academy Film Awards	1968	Best British Costume Design – Colour	A Man for All Seasons	Won	
British Academy Film Awards	1968	Best British Costume Design – Colour	Half a Sixpence	Nominated	
