= Peter Hillwood =

RAF and test pilot

- Born: January 7, 1920; London
- Died: November 9, 1966 (aged 46) the Netherlands
- Other name: Buster
- Occupation: Aviator
- Spouse: Gwendoline St Johnstone
- Children: Susan Hillwood
- Parent(s): Dagmar Sorenson and Felix Bergholtz

Peter Hillwood, DFC (born Adolf Bergholtz; 7 January 1920 – 9 November 1966) was an RAF and test pilot.

== World War II and RAF ==
Hillwood was born in London, the son of Dagmar Sorenson and Felix Bergholtz. He married Gwendoline Hillwood (née St Johnstone) and they had one child, Susan Hillwood.

In the Battle of Britain, he flew Hawker Hurricanes in RAF 56 Squadron at North Weald where he shot down a Junkers Ju 87. He was shot down in a Hurricane over the Thames Estuary off Sheerness on 13 August 1940.

In 1943 he returned to fighter command in France, Belgium and the Netherlands. In 1944 he joined RAF 127 squadron at North Weald where he flew IX Spitfires. He was awarded the Distinguished Flying Cross on 22 June 1948.

== Post World War II ==
In July 1949 he became an experimental test pilot with English Electric mainly test-flying de Havilland Vampires. In January 1950 he made his first test flight in the English Electric Canberra and on 26 August 1952 he was co-pilot on the record-breaking Atlantic crossing between Aldergrove (Ireland) and Gander (Canada) in Canberra VX185.

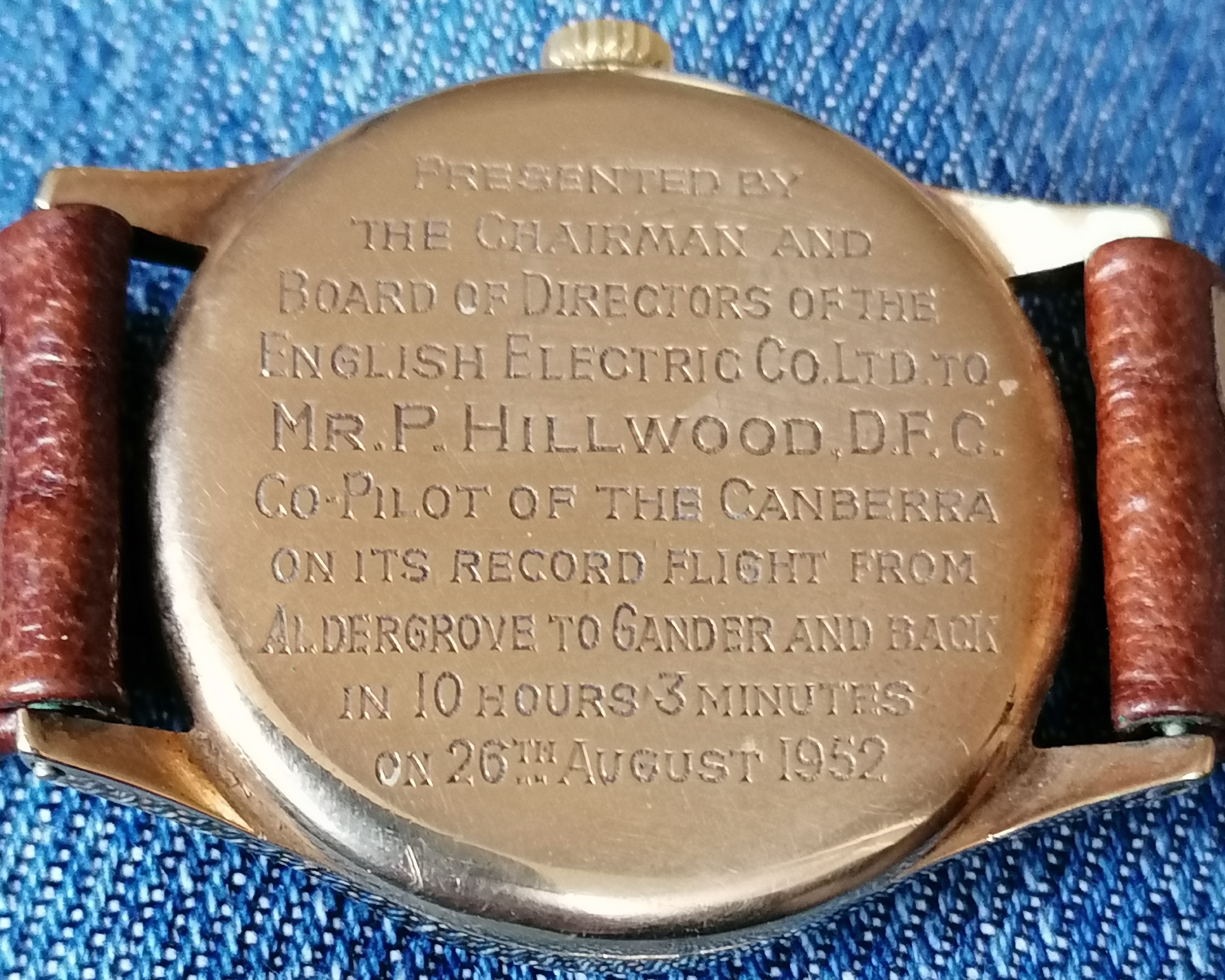

On 16 February 1956 he piloted the Canberra on the record-breaking flight between London and Cairo. In the late 1950s he became Deputy Chief Test Pilot for English Electric flying Lightnings amongst other aircraft. He left English Electric in 1965.

== Film work ==
In 1964 he re-constructed, from original designs, and flew an Avro Triplane Mk IV for the 1965 film Those Magnificent Men in their Flying Machines, Or How I Flew from London to Paris in 25 Hours 11 Minutes. In 1965 he was a stunt pilot in the 1966 war film The Blue Max in which he also played a dead German pilot.

He continued as a test pilot until his death, which occurred while flying a prototype Britten Norman BN-2 "Islander" over the Netherlands on 9 November 1966.

== Awards ==
He was awarded the Distinguished Flying Cross on 22 June 1948. He was also awarded the Distinguished Service Order.
