= Dinah Greet =

Costume designer for theatre and film (1919–2004)

- Born: Elizabeth Dinah Greet; 21 April 1916; Berkshire, England
- Died: 6 January 2004 (aged 87); Reading, Berkshire, England
- Occupation: Costume designer

Elizabeth Dinah Greet (21 April 1916 – 6 January 2004) was a British wardrobe manager and costume designer for theatre and film. She won the BAFTA Award for Best Costume Design with Osbert Lancaster for their work in Ken Annakin's 1965 film Those Magnificent Men in their Flying Machines.

== Wardrobe career ==
By 1950, Dinah Greet was wardrobe manager at The Old Vic, where she oversaw the staff of the large costume departments, based in Betterton Street at the end of Drury Lane.

Dinah Greet was costume supervisor for Jonathan Griffin's production of The Hidden King, staged for the Edinburgh Festival in 1957. Greet commissioned the production of costumes from Bermans costume house in London. The Daily Telegraph praised the design of the play, and the "gorgeous costumes".

In 1960, Greet worked as wardrobe administrator for the Stratford Shakespearean Festival in Stratford, Ontario. Joan Ganong wrote a detailed behind-the-scenes account of the Festival during that time, and described Greet's main roles and responsibilities. She sourced samples of fabrics from local suppliers, purchased the correct amounts required, organised fittings for actors, attended fittings and rehearsals, and directing the work of the costume makers. Greet is described, "notebook in hand, making brief comment and swift notes. The costume must be broken down further, it looked too shiny and new..." Once the play enters runs throughs, Greet would be "coaching and checking" that costumes had been put on correctly, and helping with quick changes behind the scenes. Maxine Graham was Greet's assistant in Statford, and recalled that although she was scary, Greet "could be very kind".

== Theatre costume ==
Dinah Greet moved from wardrobe into design. She is credited with designing several productions for the Covent Garden Opera Company (now known as the Royal Opera House) in the early 1960s. Her projects included:

- King Priam (1962)
- La forza del destino (1962)
- Tosca (1963). The dress worn by Marie Collier as Tosca in Act I is in the collection of the Royal Opera House.

== Film costume ==
In the mid-1960s, Greet started to design costumes for film.

Greet was co-designer of costumes, with Osbert Lancaster, for Those Magnificent Men in their Flying Machines (1965). They were awarded the BAFTA for Best Costume Design at the ceremony in 1966.

Other film credits include:

- Macbeth (1963), assistant dress designer.
- Help! (1965), co-designer with Julie Harris.
- How I Won the War (1967)
- Inspector Clouseau (1968) wardrobe.
- The Italian Job (1969)
- The Looking Glass War (1970)
- You Can't Win 'em All (1970) clothes for Michele Mercier.

== Personal life ==
Elizabeth Dinah Greet was born in Berkshire, the daughter of Annie and Frederick Arthur Greet. Her father was the mayor of Newbury in 1930.

She died at the Royal Berkshire Hospital on 6 January 2004.
