= Thomas N. Morahan =

British art director, production manager, and film producer (1906–1969)

Thomas N. Morahan (29 June 1906 – 1969) was a British film designer nominated for an Oscar for the film Sons and Lovers (1960).

Born Thomas Hugo Morahan, he was the son of sculptor and carver Michael Joseph Morahan (1877–1939). His own son was director and producer Christopher Morahan (1929–2017). whose own son again is film director Andrew Morahan.

== Selected filmography ==
=== Art director ===
- Dreaming Lips (1937)

=== Production Designer ===
- So Evil My Love (1948)
- Mr. Perrin and Mr. Traill (1948)
- Treasure Island (1950)
- Decameron Nights (1953)
- The Love Lottery (1954)
- The Long Haul (1957)
- Another Time, Another Place (1958)
- Sons and Lovers (1960)
- Satan Never Sleeps (1962)
- The Third Secret (1964)
- Those Magnificent Men in their Flying Machines (1965)
