= R. Silyn Roberts =

Welsh clergyman, writer, teacher and pacifist

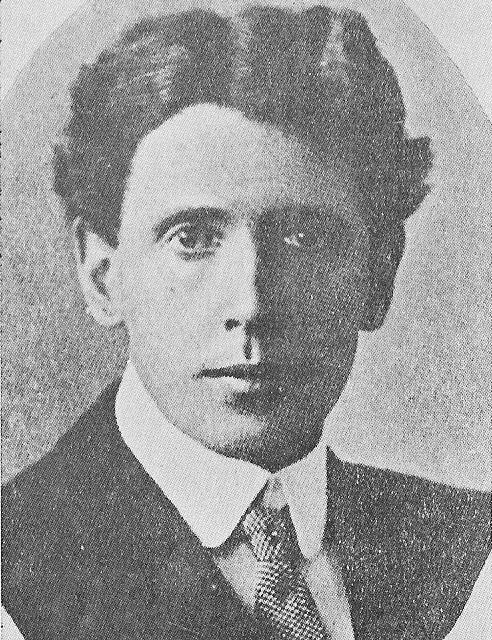
- Silyn Roberts, c. 1890
- Born: Robert Roberts; 28 March 1871; Llanllyfni, Wales
- Died: 15 August 1930 (aged 59); Bangor, Wales
- Writing career
- Period: 20th century

Robert "Silyn" Roberts (28 March 1871 – 15 August 1930) was a Welsh clergyman, writer, educator and social reformer.

== History ==
Roberts, a Calvinistic Methodist minister, was a noted Welsh-language poet, the winner of the Crown at the 1902 National Eisteddfod of Wales with his poem "Trystan ac Esyllt". Born in Bryn Llidiart, Llanllyfni, Caernarfonshire, he had worked as a slate quarryman before attending the University College of North Wales, Bangor, and Bala Theological College. From 1901 until 1912 he was a Calvinistic Methodist minister, firstly in Lewisham, London, and then in Tanygrisiau, Blaenau Ffestiniog, Merionethshire.

While living in London in the early 1900s Roberts met and befriended Vladimir Lenin.

A Socialist and a close associate of the academic and politician W. J. Gruffydd, Roberts represented the Labour Party on Merioneth County Council. In collaboration with Thomas Jones, he campaigned for adult education opportunities, and founded a branch of the Workers Educational Association in North Wales. He also supported the campaign against tuberculosis in Wales.

== Works ==
=== Poetry ===
- Telynegion (1900)
- Trystan ac Esyllt a Chaniadau Eraill (1904)

=== Fiction ===
- Llio Plas y Nos (1945) (first published in serial form in 1906)

=== Non-fiction ===
- Y Blaid Lafur Anibynnol, ei Hanes a'i Hamcan (1908)

=== Translations ===
- Gwyntoedd Croesion (translation of Cross Currents by J. O. Francis; Educational Pub. Co., 1924)
- Bugail Geifr Lorraine (translation of Le chevrier de Lorraine by Émile Souvestre; Hughes a'i Fab, 1925)
