= Prime (rocket) =

British orbital rocket of the company Orbex

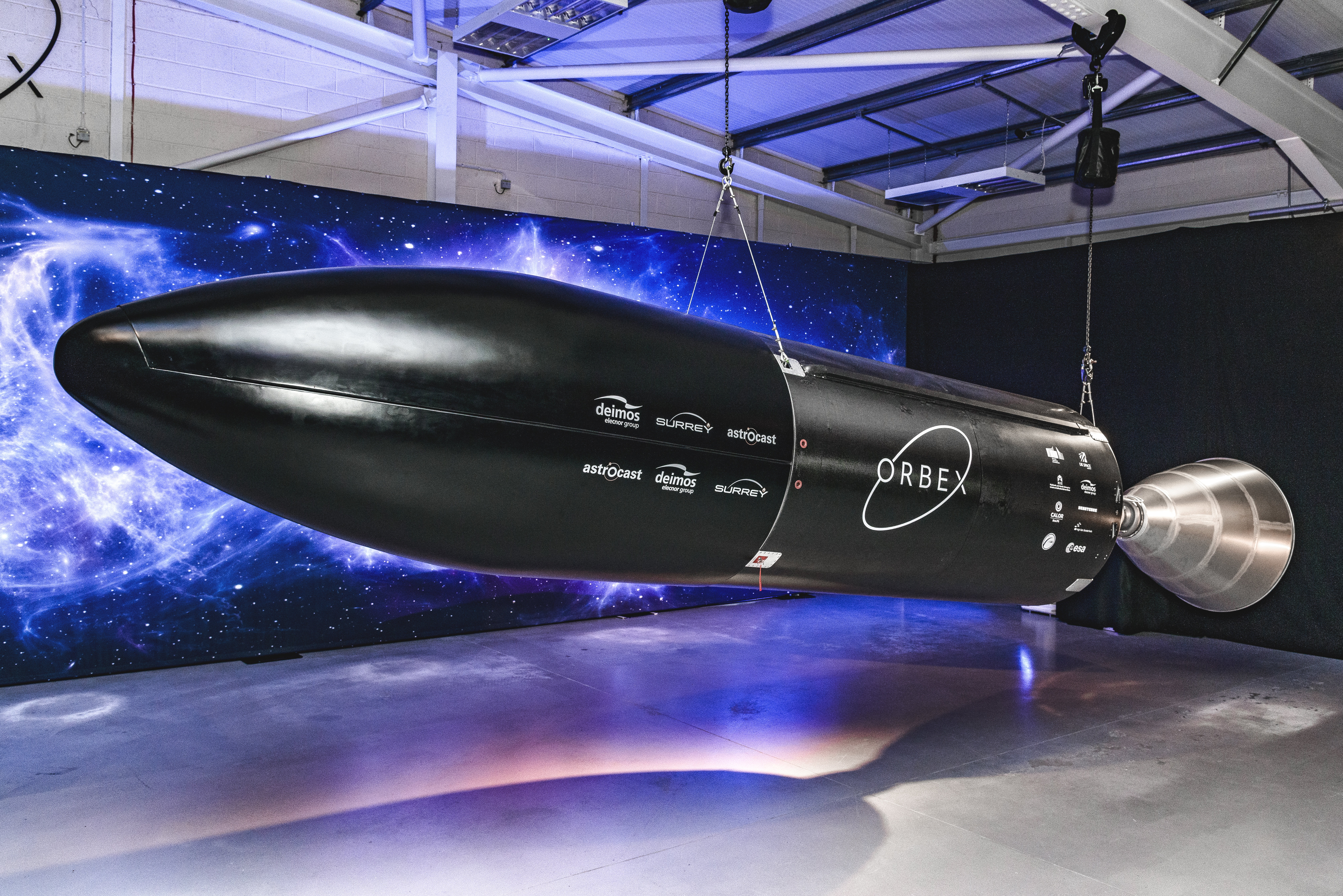
- Second stage engineering prototype of the Prime orbital rocket
- Function: Small payloads to low Earth orbit
- Manufacturer: Orbex
- Country of origin: United Kingdom

Size
- Height: 19 m (62 ft)
- Diameter: 1.45 m (4 ft 9 in)
- Mass: 18,000 kg (40,000 lb)
- Stages: 2

Capacity

Payload to SSO (500 km or 310 mi)
- Mass: 165 kg (364 lb)

Associated rockets
- Comparable: Electron

Launch history
- Status: Canceled
- Launch sites: SaxaVord Spaceport; Sutherland spaceport (proposed); Azores spaceport (proposed)

First stage
- Diameter: 1.45 m (4 ft 9 in)
- Powered by: 6 gas generator cycle engines
- Propellant: LOX / bioLPG

Second stage
- Diameter: 1.45 m (4 ft 9 in)
- Powered by: 1 pressure fed engine
- Propellant: LOX / bioLPG

The Prime rocket was a British small launch vehicle under development by Orbex. Its booster (first stage) was planned to be reusable. The rocket's diameter was 1.45 m (4 ft 9 in), was constructed from carbon composites, and would use a non-toxic bi-propellant consisting of liquid oxygen and sub cooled propane. First stage reuse was planned to be achieved by a combination of a parachute and four 'petals' which would fold out prior to atmospheric re-entry to induce drag and passively reorient the vehicle. It would be capable of launching payloads up to 165 kilograms (364 lb) to a standard 500 km Sun-synchronous orbit (SSO).

In February 2026, the project was cancelled as Orbex ceased operations.

== Propellants ==
One cited advantage of using propane is that it remains liquid at the cryogenic temperatures of liquid oxygen, which enables a design where a central carbon-fibre tank of propane is surrounded by an outer tank of liquid oxygen, creating a light structural mass. It also actively sub cools the propane on the rocket, allowing for greater propellant density and smaller propellant tanks relative to similar launch vehicles.

== Previously planned flights ==
In 2022, the maiden flight of Prime was expected to occur in late 2025, subject to the availability of SaxaVord Spaceport and a Civil Aviation Authority launch licence, for Surrey Satellite Technology Ltd. In 2025, the first flight was planned for early 2026. Orbex also announced it was chosen by nanosatellite company Astrocast to launch their communications satellites and by Italian in-orbit logistics company D-Orbit for two other launches.

== See also ==
- European Launcher Challenge – Space launch vehicle development programme of the European Space Agency
- Orbital launchers under development in Europe:
  - Ariane Next – Orbital recoverable launch vehicle of the European company ArianeGroup
  - Maia – French orbital reusable rocket of the company MaiaSpace
  - Miura 5 – European orbital recoverable rocket of the company PLD Space
  - Miura Next – European orbital recoverable rocket of the company PLD Space
  - RFA One – In development multistage small launch vehicle
  - Spectrum – Two-stage small launch vehicle
