= Spaceport 1 =

Proposed launch site in North Uist, Scotland

Coordinates: 57.6493°N 7.4854°W

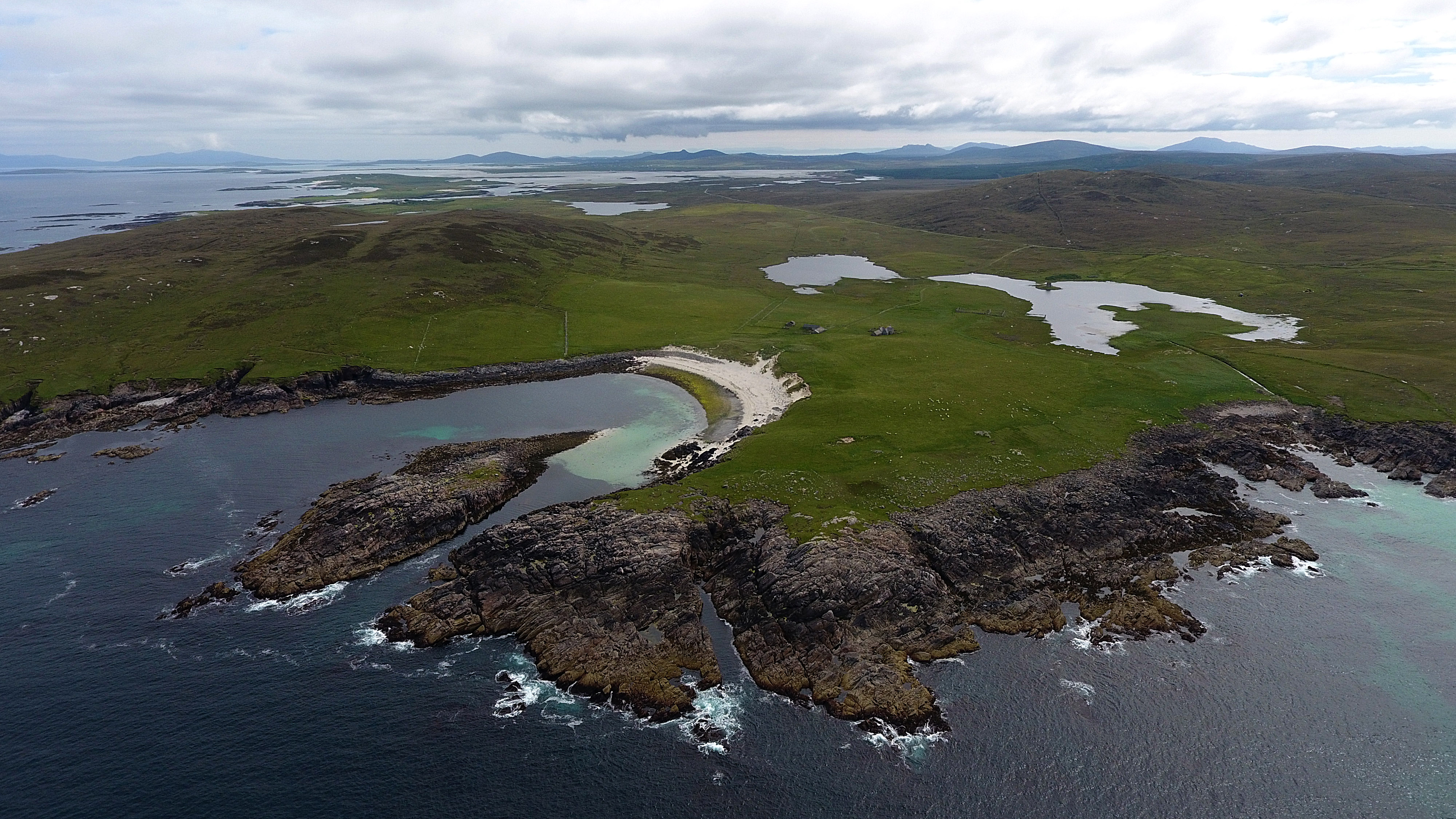
- Launch pad to be constructed between Scolpaig Bay and Loch Scolpaig
- Interactive map of Spaceport 1
- Location: Scolpaig, North Uist, Scotland

Spaceport 1 is a spaceport under construction in Scolpaig in North Uist, Scotland. Planning permission was granted in 2023 despite significant objections. Construction work for the enabling infrastructure started in November 2024. The UK Civil Aviation Authority (CAA) granted airspace approval in December 2025.

The site is designed to be a low-impact multi-customer sub-orbital vertical launch facility. It is expected to build on capabilities and experience from the nearby MOD Hebrides.

== History ==
In 2018, the North Uist site lost out to the Sutherland spaceport for £2.5m in UK Government funding to develop the first vertical launch site.

In 2019 Comhairle nan Eilean Siar (the local council) agreed to invest £1m to purchase land at Scolpaig for the construction of a launch facility, in a consortium with Highlands and Islands Enterprise, the UK technology company QinetiQ and the consultancy Commercial Space Technologies (CST). Rockets would be launched vertically to carry payloads of up to 500 kg into Sun synchronous and polar orbits. The project was initially promised to create 50 to 70 jobs.

The Comhairle approved the project in June 2023, despite 244 responses opposing the development including a petition with nearly 1000 signatures, and only six in support. The proposals then went to Scottish Government Ministers, who decided in July not to "call-in" the plans, therefore the project could go ahead.

The CAA granted airspace approval in December 2025, which would take effect on 22 January 2026.

=== Opposition to the development ===
A group named "Friends of Scolpaig" was formed in August 2019, to oppose the development of a spaceport in the National Scenic Area of Scolpaig. Concerns included the council not consulting with the community prior to spending one million pounds on the project, intention to approve the planning application prior to community engagement, and avoiding the requirement to carry out an Environmental Impact Assessment.

The Royal Society for the Protection of Birds (RSPB) objected to the proposal on the grounds that an Environmental Impact Assessment was required to assess the potential impact on protected wildlife sites, habitats and species. The location is within a highly sensitive area, with Special Protection Areas nearby, designated for their internationally important bird interest. They also noted as well as being the developer and applicant, the Comhairele would also decide if the project should go ahead in its role as the planning authority. According to the RSPB, the site is close to the West Coast of the Outer Hebrides proposed Special Protection Area (pSPA), the North Uist Machair and Islands Special Protection Area (SPA) and Ramsar site, North Uist Machair Special Area of Conservation (SAC) and Vallay Site of Special Scientific Interest (SSSI). Key species which might be affected include corn crake, the Greenland barnacle goose and ringed plover.

=== Construction ===
In November 2024, local contractor Macaulay Askernish started construction work on the enabling infrastructure of upgraded access tracks and new parking areas, plus installing fibre broadband to the site. The total cost of the enabling works was estimated at £2.6m, with £947k from Highlands and Islands Enterprise and £675k from the Comhairele's capital works programme.

== See also ==
- Space industry of Scotland
- SaxaVord Spaceport
- Sutherland spaceport
