= 3Cat-8 =

Ionospheric research satellite

- Mission type: Ionosphere research, technology demonstration, education
- Operator: (Spain) (Catalonia) UPC

Spacecraft properties
- Bus: 6U CubeSat

Start of mission
- Launch date: NET 2026
- Rocket: RFA One
- Launch site: (United Kingdom) (Scotland) SaxaVord Spaceport
- Contractor: (Germany) Rocket Factory Augsburg

3Cat-8 is a future Spanish ionospheric research satellite under development by the NanoSat Lab at Universitat Politècnica de Catalunya. The 6U CubeSat-type small satellite features a deployable Fresnel zone plate antenna, a dual receiver for GNSS occultation and reflectometry, a hyperspectral imager for observing aurora, as well as a PocketQube deployer. The satellite is expected to launch no earlier than 2026 from SaxaVord Spaceport in Scotland, on the second test flight of the German rocket RFA One. The launch of the satellite is supported by the German government via DLR.
