= Space industry of Scotland =

Space industry

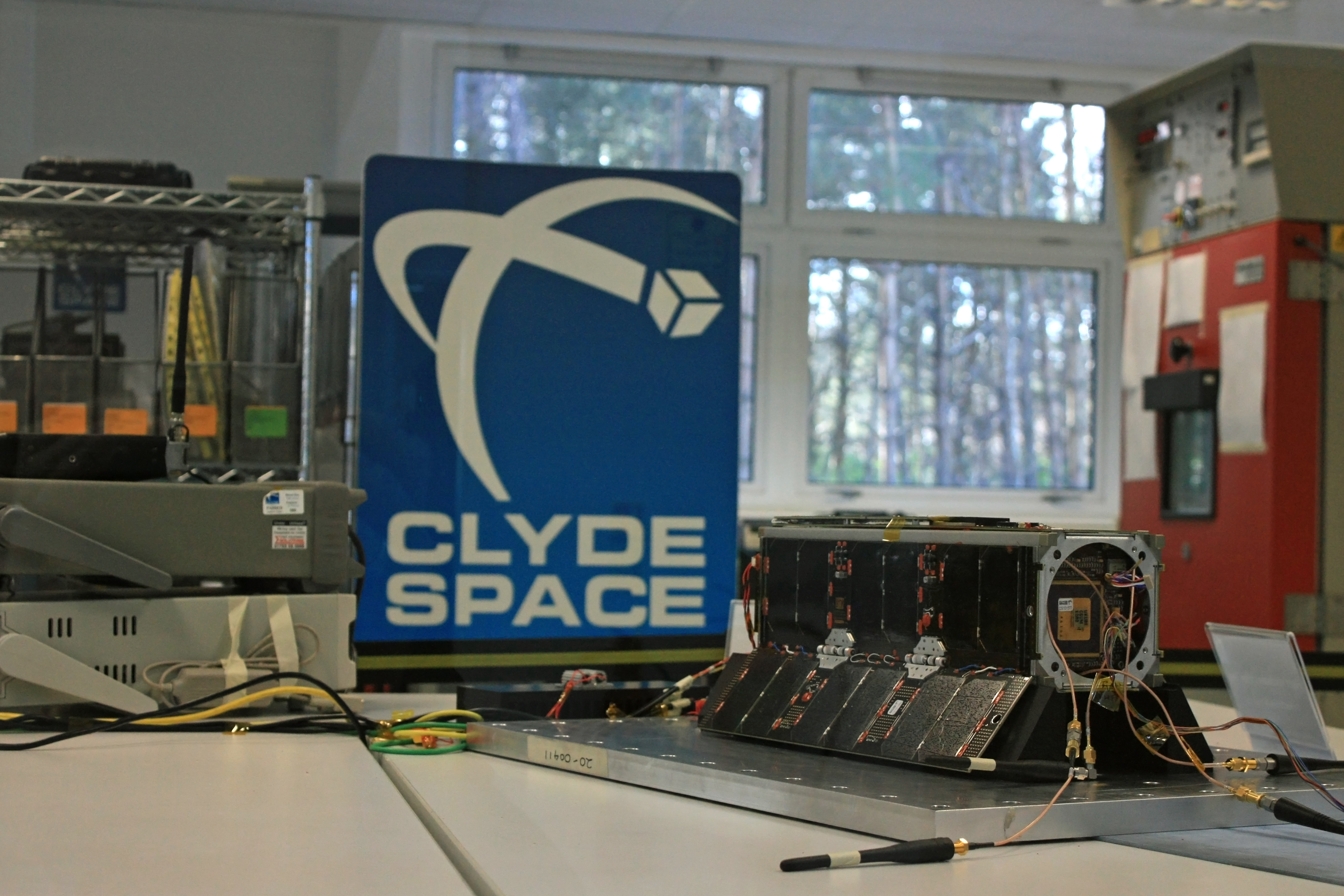
Clyde Space made Scotland's first satellite, the UKube-1, which was launched on the Russian Soyuz-2 rocket in 2013

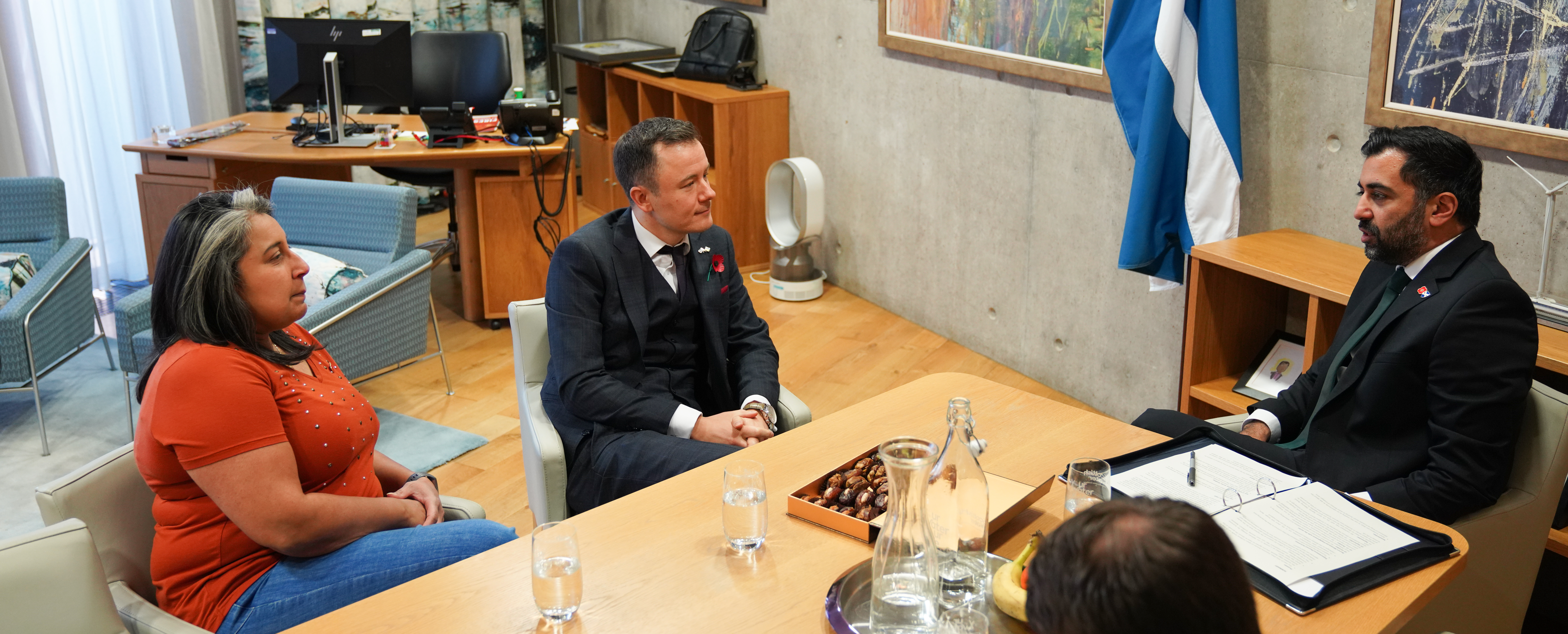
First Minister Humza Yousaf meets with Dr Hina Khan, the first Executive Director of Space Scotland, and Scottish Government Space Envoy, Daniel Smith

In May 2021, the Space industry of Scotland consisted of 173 space companies operating across Scotland. These include spacecraft manufacturers, launch providers, downstream data analyzers, and research organisations. The Scottish Space Strategy published in 2021 set the ambition for the sector to contribute £4 billion to the Scottish economy.

Recognised as a European leader in space technology, Scotland builds more satellites than any other European country. Space Scotland, a not for profit organisation supported by Scottish Enterprise, claim that this is possible due to "entreprenerialism, technical expertise in miniaturisation of satellites and support from Scottish universities". Scotland's space industry contribute research and projects to other agencies, including NASA and the European Space Agency.

In 2017/18 it was estimated that the space industry in Scotland employed approximately 8,000 people with an annual growth rate of 12% between 2013 and 2018. London Economics published a report projecting £2billion in income for Scotland's space cluster by 2030. Scottish space industry jobs represent almost 1 in 5 of all UK space industry employment.

== Scottish Space Groups ==
=== Space Scotland ===
Space Scotland (formerly Scottish Space Leadership Council) is an industry coordinating body created to promote the Scottish space industry. In conjunction with Scottish Space Academic Forum and The Scottish Government, they have published A Strategy for Space in Scotland 2021 for the continued development of the Scottish space industry over the next decade. It acts as a "single voice" to collectively represent the wider Scottish space industry organisations, such as the Scottish Space Academic Forum and the Scottish Government Space Group.

The Scottish Space Group was established by Space Scotland in order to facilitate resources that Space Scotland required in order to "enhance, accelerate and improve sectoral growth". The organisation is committed to the further expansion of its operations, claiming that it will "provide in-depth industry perspectives, guidance and advice to support the future growth and success of “Team Scotland”". To achieve this, it will "continue to be an advocate for collective Scottish business interests".

=== Scottish Space Academic Forum (SSAF) ===
The Scottish Space Academic Forum (SSAF) was established "as an initiative and management forum aimed at ensuring alignment across research, development and education to provide support to maximise the research potential of Team Scotland for world class innovation and economic growth". The relationship between the space industry of Scotland and academic research was seen as a crucial part of the industries success, "in terms of accelerating the technical readiness levels of innovation". It works in partnership with other agencies, including Skills Development Scotland to ensure future growth in the sector by facilitating development of appropriate skills and experience required to work within Scotland's space sector.

=== Scottish Government Space Group ===
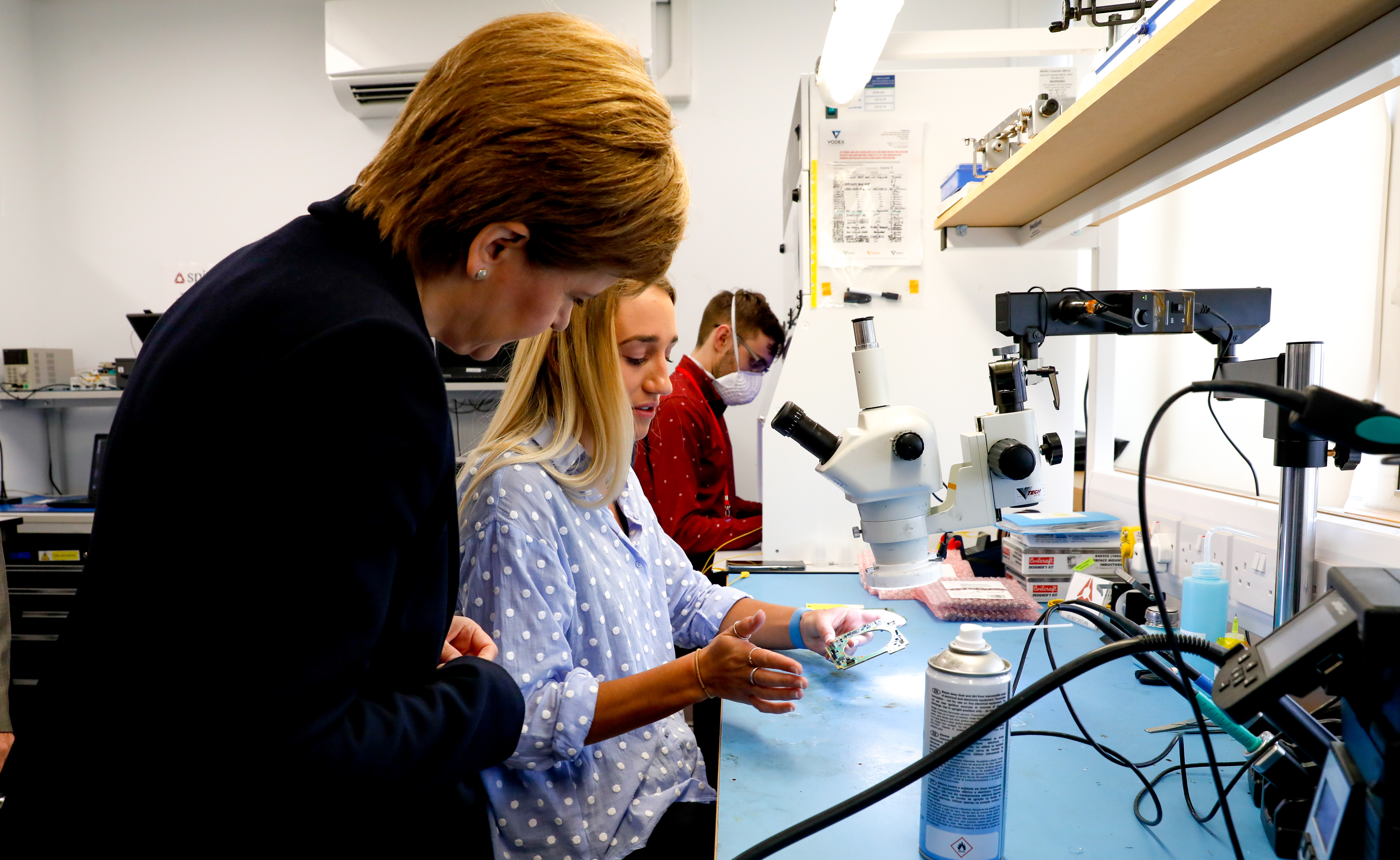
First Minister Nicola Sturgeon during a visit to Spire Global in Glasgow. Spire Global builds, tests and operates nanosatellites tracking aviation, maritime and weather patterns

The Scottish Government launched the cross–agency initiative, the Scottish Government Space Group, which collects the Scottish Government and the Enterprise and Skills agencies of the government together in order to facilitate discussions that will continue to develop Scotland's space sector and associated industry. The Scottish Government recognise space and the associated space industry, exploration, research, development and manufacturing of space craft, as a key component to Scotland's future economic growth.

The creation of the Scottish Government Space Group ensures the Scottish Government "will work closely with the sector and beyond to ensure that appropriate infrastructure and investment across the public and private sectors is provided to enable growth and enhance employment opportunities".

=== Public sector bodies ===
Scotland's space industry, and the work of Space Scotland, is supported by a number of public sector bodies and agencies, including:

- UK Space Agency
- Science and Technology Facilities Council
- Royal Observatory Edinburgh
- UK Astronomy Technology Centre
- Higgs Centre for Innovation
- Satellite Applications Catapult
- European Space Agency
- Scottish Environment Protection Agency (SEPA)
- Scottish Association for Marine Science
- Marine Scotland
- Marine Alliance for Science and Technology for Scotland (MASTS)

== Space Centres in Scotland ==
=== Higgs Centre for Innovation ===
The Higgs Centre for Innovation was created by the Science and Technology Facilities Council at the Royal Observatory Edinburgh to incubate space startups, provide the sector with facilities for building and demonstrating space technologies, and to give doctoral candidates startup and entrepreneurial experience. The facilities include cleanrooms, cryostats, vibration shaker tables, thermal chambers, and EMC testing facilities. The Higgs Centre is one of four ESA Business Incubation Centres in the UK.

=== Bayes Centre ===
The Bayes Centre, at the University of Edinburgh, hosts a coordinating hub for space and satellite data science activities that brings together academia, NGOs, the space industry, and governmental organisations with a focus on commercializing university research.

== Ground Stations ==
There are several Ground Stations in Scotland with the capability to transmit and/or receive data from polar orbiting satellites (geostationary satellites not included as the smaller infrastructure required means they are not restricted to industry). Some ground stations are for research, some are commercial such as Dundee Satellite Station, and some military, such as QinetiQ at West Freugh. Commercial ground stations include:

=== Dundee Satellite Station ===
Dundee Satellite Station was founded in the 1970s and is now located in Errol, Perthshire with a selection of antennas for X-band, L-band and S-band capability.

== Spaceports ==
There are multiple spaceports in varying phases of development in Scotland. Two Scottish spaceports, SaxaVord and Sutherland, were initially scheduled to have their first launches in 2022. The date for SaxaVord has been pushed back, initially to 2024 and by late 2025 the first launch date had slipped to 2026.

=== SaxaVord ===
SaxaVord Spaceport is located on the isle of Unst, in the Shetland Islands. It is planned to host Lockheed Martin's first rocket launches as well as Cumbernauld-based Skyrora's launches.

=== Sutherland Space Hub ===
Sutherland spaceport is located in the north of the Scottish mainland. It had six launch contracts with rocket maker Orbex which is headquartered in Forres, Scotland. In December 2024, Orbex announced they were pausing work in Sutherland, instead launching from SaxaVord.

=== Spaceport 1 ===
Spaceport 1 is located at Scolpaig on North Uist in the Western Isles. It is intended for suborbital polar-orbit launches. Planning permission was granted in 2023, construction started in November 2024. The UK Civil Aviation Authority granted airspace approval in December 2025.

== Space Data Companies ==
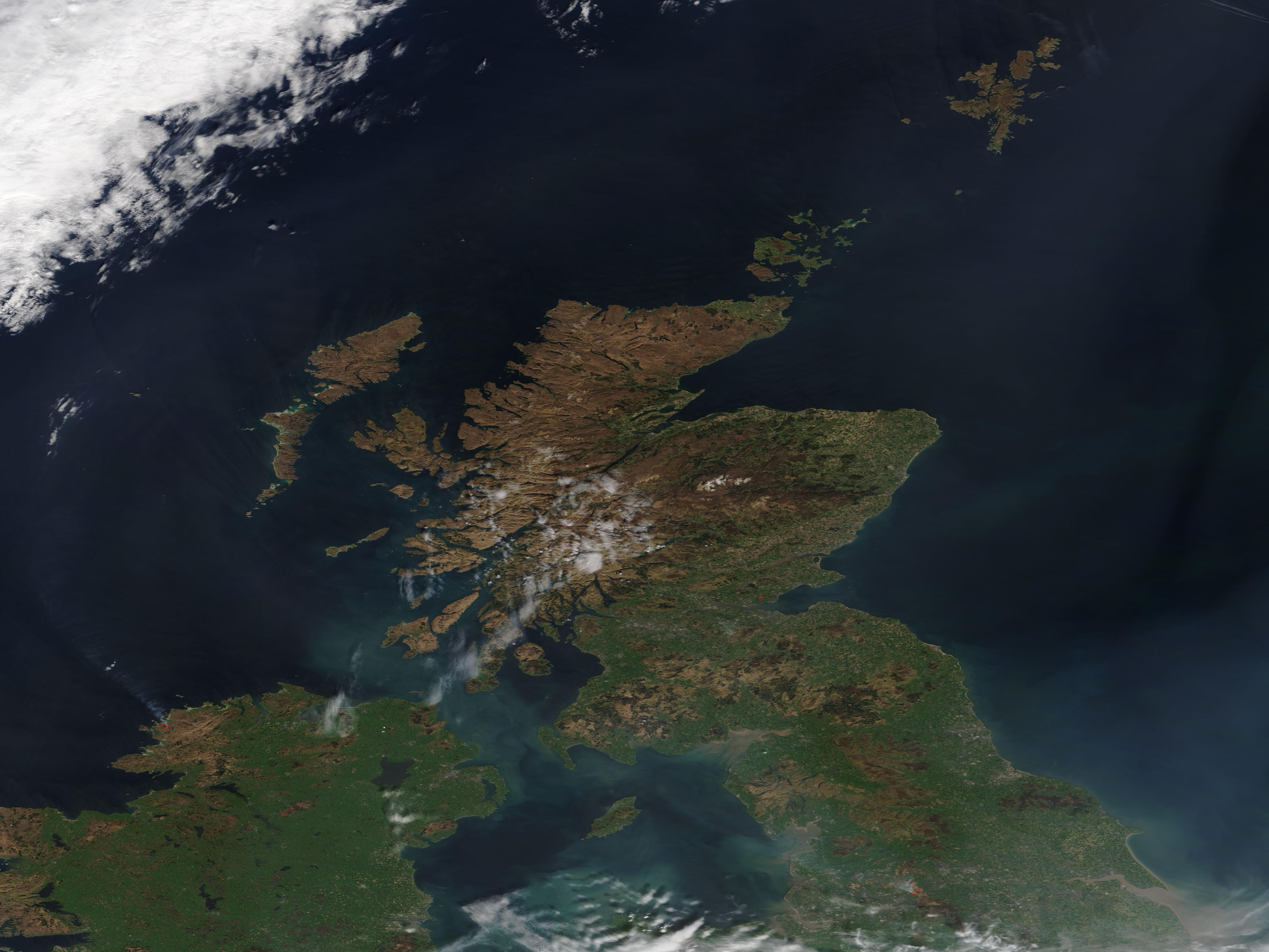
Scotland is a global location and European leader for commercial space development

=== Omanos Analytics ===
Omanos Analytics, based in Glasgow, combines earth observation data with ground source data to track operations of infrastructure projects such as mining, logging, and rubber plantations. These are monitored for their environmental and community impact, especially in hostile and low-infrastructure regions with the goal of supporting sustainable development.

=== Ecometrica ===
Ecometrica, with offices in Edinburgh, has developed an end-to-end environmental SaaS whose purpose is to analyze earth observation data combined with on-the-ground data collection sources to identify risks and opportunities for their customers. The software assists sustainability planning, operations and reporting.

=== Space Intelligence ===
Space Intelligence, based in Edinburgh, uses machine learning on remote sensing satellite data to classify landscapes, especially around deforestation and forest degradation, to provide businesses seeking to reduce their environmental impact with actionable data.

=== Trade in Space ===
Trade in Space, based in Edinburgh, uses satellite data to create smart contracts via the blockchain in real time for commodities such as coffee.

=== Carbomap ===
Carbomap, based in Edinburgh, builds tools to analyze and develop insights from environmental data from remote sensing satellites and UAVs. They work with governments, NGOs, and research institutes to map out forests and monitor deforestation.

=== EarthBlox ===
EarthBlox, based in Edinburgh, produces a no-code SaaS interface to obtain and analyze data from remote sensing satellites for applications ranging from flood damage, crop production, and climate change.

=== Bird.i ===
Bird.i, based in Glasgow, uses satellite data to provide businesses with monitoring of infrastructure projects such as mining, oil and gas, and construction. It was acquired in April 2020 by Zonda.

== Rocket makers ==
=== Skyrora ===
Skyrora, based in Cumbernauld, builds rockets suited for the launch of small satellites. The Skyrora XL rocket is intended to launch payloads of up to 315 kg into a Sun-synchronous orbit between 500 and 1000 km or a polar orbit between 200 and 1000 km. In 2022, they hoped the first scheduled launch would be in 2023. However, by 2025 that had slipped to Q1 2026 at the earliest.

=== Orbex ===
Orbex, based in Forres (about 25 miles northeast of Inverness), was developing a rocket called Prime that is intended to launch nano satellites into a polar orbit. In 2021, the first launch was targeted to end of 2022. In June 2025, this was postponed to 2026 due to infrastructure limitations and other issues. In February 2026, the company ceased operations.
