= UK Space Agency =

Space agency of the UK Government

Agency overview
- Abbreviation: UKSA
- Formed: 1 April 2010; 16 years ago
- Preceding agency: British National Space Centre
- Type: Space agency
- Jurisdiction: United Kingdom, Crown Dependencies and British Overseas Territories
- Headquarters: Didcot, England, UK; 51°34′50.2″N 1°18′28.8″W
- Minister responsible: Blair McDougall (Department for Business, Innovation, Science and Trade)
- Director: Rebecca Evernden
- Deputy directors: Mark Bacon & Emily Dineley
- Owner: Department for Business, Innovation, Science and Trade
- Annual budget: £618.2 million (2024/2025)
- Website: gov.uk/uksa

The UK Space Agency (UKSA) is a unit within the Department for Business, Innovation, Science and Trade (DSIT), responsible for the United Kingdom's civil space programme. It was established on 1 April 2010 as an executive agency to replace the British National Space Centre (BNSC) and took over responsibility for government policy and key budgets for space exploration; it represents the United Kingdom in all negotiations on space matters. UKSA "[brings] together all UK civil space activities under one single management", and is based at the Harwell Science and Innovation Campus near Didcot, Oxfordshire, England. In August 2025, the UK government announced that UKSA would be absorbed into the DSIT in April 2026, although its name would be retained.

== History and aims ==
The creation of the UK Space Agency was first publicly announced by UK Minister of State for Science and Innovation, Lord Drayson, on 10 December 2009 during a speech at the Rutherford Appleton Lab (RAL) space conference. As the UK Space Agency neared its opening day, Peter Mandelson, Lord Drayson and astronaut Tim Peake officially announced its establishment at the Queen Elizabeth II Conference Centre on 23 March 2010. On that day, a ceremony was held in which Queen Elizabeth II unveiled a plaque at the entrance to the centre.

Around £230 million of funding and management functions were merged into the UK Space Agency from other organisations. "Improving co-ordination of UK efforts in fields such as earth science, telecoms and space exploration" was to form part of its remit, according to Lord Drayson.

Prior to the creation of the agency, the space and satellite industry in the UK was valued at £9 billion and supported 68,000 jobs. The 20-year aim of the agency was to increase the industry to £40 billion and 100,000 jobs, and to represent 10% of worldwide space products and services (increasing from the current 6%). This plan arose from the "Space Innovation and Growth Strategy" (Space-IGS) report, published by the Space Innovation and Growth Team in February 2010.

David Williams was appointed acting chief executive on 1 April 2010, and he was confirmed as the first CEO on 1 April 2011. Alice Bunn was the international director from Jan 2018 to June 2021.

Although Space-IGS called for the UK to double European Space Agency (ESA) contributions and to initiate and lead at least three missions between 2010 and 2030, this was not committed to, with Lord Drayson stating that "We will require a compelling business case for each proposal or mission".

On 20 August 2025, the UK Government announced that the UK Space Agency would cease to exist as an independent executive agency and would be merged with the Department for Science, Innovation and Technology (DSIT)'s Space Directorate in April 2026. The merged unit will, however, "keep the UK Space Agency (UKSA) name and brand and will be staffed by experts from both organisations", according to the announcement.

=== Transfers of authority ===
The UK Space Agency took over the following responsibilities from other government organisations:

- All responsibilities, personnel, and assets of the British National Space Centre
- ESA subscriptions from Natural Environment Research Council, Science and Technology Facilities Council and Technology Strategy Board, including project grants and post-launch support
- UK elements of the space components of Global Monitoring for Environment and Security, and the Galileo satellite navigation system
- The financial interest in the European Union Satellite Centre (agreed in principle)
- Space technology and instrumentation funding from the Research Councils UK and Technology Strategy Board

On 31 January 2021, The Daily Telegraph reported that following a government "Space Landscape Review" responsibility for space policy and strategy was being transferred to the Department for Business, Energy and Industrial Strategy. Earlier, responsibility for regulation, such as for spacecraft launch, had been transferred to the Civil Aviation Authority. A new cabinet committee, the National Space Council, was soon due to have its first meeting following its announcement in the 2019 Queen's Speech.

=== UK Space Gateway ===
The UK Space Gateway at Harwell, Oxfordshire is a focal point for growth in the UK's space sector. Harwell is home to a growing number of space organisations including start-ups, inward investors, corporate offices, the Satellite Applications Catapult, RAL Space and ESA's ECSAT Facility. As of April 2016, the site is estimated to host over 600 space-related employees working in circa 60 organisations.

==== The European Centre for Space Applications and Telecommunications (ECSAT) ====
ESA’s UK facility, ECSAT, has been developing steadily since 2008, following the UK government's decision to increase its contribution to ESA. Named after the ESA's first British director general, Roy Gibson, ECSAT's building hosts 100+ jobs including teams in telecommunications and integrated applications. Special emphasis is put on the development of new markets for satellite-based services and applications. In addition, new satellite, ground infrastructure and product developments are being initiated through original schemes of public–private partnerships with world-class operators. The building also houses the Earth Observation Climate Office, Science and Exploration teams and Technology and Quality Management teams supporting ESA research and development programmes in the UK, focusing on 'game-changing' technologies and capabilities.

==== Satellite Applications Catapult ====
The Satellite Applications Catapult is an independent innovation and technology company, created as part of the Catapult centres programme to foster growth across the economy through the exploitation of space. The Catapult helps organisations make use of and benefit from satellite technologies, and bring together multi-disciplinary teams to generate ideas and solutions in an open innovation environment. It was established in May 2013 by Innovate UK (formerly known as the Technology Strategy Board) as one of a network of centres to accelerate the take-up of emerging technologies and drive economic growth. It is a not-for-profit research organisation which is registered as a private company limited by guarantee and controlled by its Board.

==== International Space Innovation Centre ====
A £40m International Space Innovation Centre (ISIC) was created in 2011 at Harwell, alongside the research facility for ESA. Some of its tasks were to investigate climate change, and the security of space systems. £24 million of the cost of the centre was to be funded by the government, with the remainder from industry. In April 2013, ISIC merged into the newly formed Satellite Applications Catapult.

==== Abandoned independent satellite navigation system ====
In November 2018, the British government announced that the UK Space Agency would abandon ties to the European Space Agency's Galileo navigation system following Brexit in favour of developing its own system of navigation satellites. The total cost of the United Kingdom Global Navigation Satellite System project was estimated at £5 billion.

In July 2020, the UK government and Indian conglomerate Bharti Enterprises jointly purchased the bankrupt OneWeb satellite company. The UKSA had advised the government that OneWeb was not suitable as a basis for a satellite navigation system. On 25 September 2020, The Daily Telegraph reported that the United Kingdom Global Navigation Satellite System project had been scrapped. The project, deemed unnecessary and too expensive, will be replaced with a new project that will explore alternative ways to provide satellite navigation services.

== Key people ==
The agency's director since April 2026 is Rebecca Evernden, who succeeded Paul Bate.

== Spaceports ==
Proposed sites for spaceports, and the companies associated with them, are as follows:

- SaxaVord Spaceport – Unst, Scotland
  - Lockheed Martin / ABL Space Systems
  - Skyrora
- Space Hub Sutherland – Sutherland, Scotland
  - Orbex
- Spaceport Cornwall – Newquay Airport, Cornwall, England
  - Virgin Orbit

== See also ==
- UK Space Conference
- List of government space agencies
