= European Launcher Challenge =

Space launch vehicle development programme of the European Space Agency

- ESA logo
- Mission statement: "to strengthen Europe's position in the global space market and ensure sustainable and competitive access to space to European and worldwide customers"
- Type of project: Aerospace
- Owner: European Space Agency
- Established: 2023; 3 years ago
- Status: Active
- Website: ESA.int: European Launcher Challenge

The European Launcher Challenge (ELC) is a programme of the European Space Agency (ESA) aiming to support new European space launch capabilities by funding the development of small and medium orbital launch vehicles. Within ELC, the agency plans to select companies that will be awarded contracts for launch services in the period 2026–2030 (component A) and launch service capacity upgrade demonstrations (component B).

== History ==
ESA council announced the European Launcher Challenge in Seville, Spain in November 2023. On 24 March 2025, ESA officially published a call for proposals for ELC and allotted a maximum of €169 million per company. By June 2025, ESA announced that it had received 12 proposals for the programme and on 7 July 2025, the agency has preselected five companies for further competition: Isar Aerospace, MaiaSpace, Orbex, PLD Space, and Rocket Factory Augsburg (RFA).

At the ESA ministerial council held in Bremen, Germany in November 2025, the member states confirmed major investments in ELC. The Challenge has doubled its expected subscriptions to €900 million at the council.

In August 2026, ESA signed the first contracts with three ELC launch providers, concluding the second stage of the Challenge. This marked the beginning of the implementation phase of ELC. MaiaSpace was the only one of the companies that opted for payment based on launch contracts instead of proven technical development of their Maia launcher.

2026 ELC contracts
Company	Rocket	Amount (€ million)	Main funding	Additional funding
RFA	RFA One	186.9	Germany	UK
PLD Space	Miura 5	158.9	Spain	Germany
Isar Aerospace	Spectrum	197.8	Germany	Austria, Norway

On 5 September 2026, Isar Aerospace's Spectrum rocket successfully launched from Andøya Spaceport to low Earth orbit, marking the first orbital launch from Western European soil. With this launch, Isar Aerospace completed the first milestone of ELC.

== See also ==
- List of ESA programmes and missions
- LEO Cargo Return Service
- Commercial spaceflight
