= Space Innovation and Growth Team =

- Formation: 26 June 2009
- Dissolved: 10 February 2010
- Purpose: Strategic planning of the UK space industry
- Main organ: Executive Steering Board
- Parent organization: BIS
- Affiliations: Virgin Galactic, Surrey Satellite Technology, Astrium, Technology Strategy Board, Avanti Communications, Imperial College London, Broadband Stakeholder Group

The Space Innovation and Growth Team (also known as the Space IGT) was a joint initiative among the United Kingdom government, academia and the country's space industry. Its goal was to define a 20-year vision and strategy for the future growth of the UK space industry, which was published in February 2010 as the Space Innovation and Growth Strategy (IGS).

== Formation ==
The initiative was launched in June 2009 and was expected to report within six months.

Membership of the panel included:

- Andy Green, IGT chair and Logica CEO
- Lord Drayson, Minister for Science and Innovation
- Perry Melton, Inmarsat COO
- Major Timothy Peake, ESA astronaut

== Outcomes ==
The report titled The Space Innovation and Growth Strategy was published on 10 February 2010.

The report contributed to the establishment of the UK Space Agency in April 2010, overseen by the Space Leadership Council.

A National Space Technology Strategy was published by the Space Leadership Council on 7 April 2011. This strategy is overseen by the National Space Technology Steering Group which was formed in August 2010.

== Purpose ==
Its purpose was to "attempt to identify key trends and then list the actions industry and government need to take if they want to fully exploit the changes that are coming over the next 20 years."

This included "involving the entire UK space community in setting out the challenges and opportunities that will govern its future value, competitiveness and growth". A "20 year strategy for the future of the British space industry" would be created enabling Britain to become "a leader in the world space landscape", as well as creating jobs, income and adding economic value to the country. One of the topics would be to identify "facilitators and barriers, whether policy and government related, economic, financial, technological, innovation, or awareness and perception issues".

=== Objectives ===
- Identifying and benchmarking the full UK space capability; identifying the future market opportunities; and proposing a policy for growth and a technology roadmap to support this
- Aligning the UK's civil, defence and security policies in science, manufacturing, and 'downstream' applications businesses
- Creating a 'space aware' culture and its importance to everyday life to maximise the potential for jobs and wealth creation in the UK, resulting in Space being factored and considered in business and HMG policy

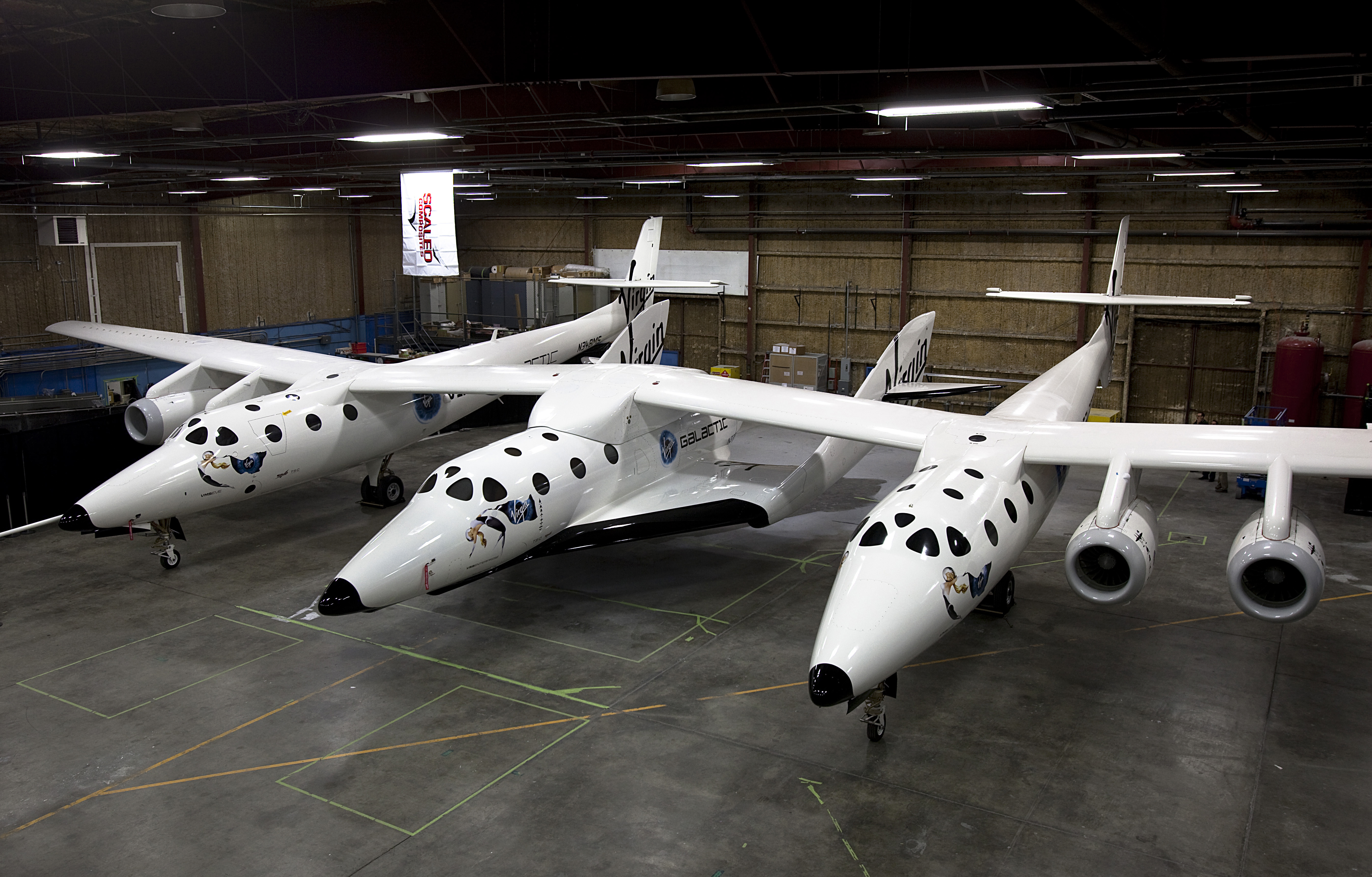
Virgin Galactic's SpaceShipTwo

The expected growth of the space tourism industry was expected to be one of the key trends of the next 20 years and Virgin Galactic had agreed to help develop the IGT blueprint in the hope that the UK could mirror the legislative measures of USA and Japan to enable the UK to stay at the forefront of the global space tourism industry.
