= Volodymyr Levykin =

- Born: February 1976 (age 49); Ukraine
- Education: Zaporizhzhia National Technical University
- Occupation(s): Space and technology entrepreneur
- Known for: Founder and CEO of Skyrora
- Awards: Entrepreneur of the Year in Aerospace & Defense (The Stevie Awards); Satellite Personality of the Year (SSPI UK, 2024)

Volodymyr Levykin (born February 1976) is a Ukrainian-born British space and technology entrepreneur. He is the founder and CEO of Skyrora, a UK-based private space company.

== Early life and education ==
Volodymyr Levykin was born in February 1976. He graduated from Zaporizhzhia National Technical University in 1998 with a Master’s degree in Computer Science.

== Career ==
=== Early career ===
Levykin’s career began in the tech industry. He served as the Managing Director of a Scotland-based e-commerce company listed on the London Stock Exchange AIM. He also held leadership positions at companies such as Together Networks, Cupid Labs, EasyDate, and IDE Group. He later ran an IT company in California before moving back to his previous home in Edinburgh, Scotland, to start a space industry startup.

=== Skyrora ===
In 2017, Levykin founded Skyrora, shortly after the UK government introduced the Space Industry Bill to support the development of the national space sector. His company specializes in the development of launch vehicles and ecologically sustainable rocket fuels. Its headquarters is in Edinburgh, with testing and manufacturing facilities spread across the UK. In 2024 his company opened the UK’s largest rocket launch testing facility and launched InRange, a space-based launch vehicle telemetry relay system that uses geostationary satellites to enable continuous data transmission between the launch vehicle and the control centre during flight.

Levykin also founded Skyrora Ventures to invest in ideas and projects that support the company’s operations and development, focusing on developing integrated space services, including satellite technology, hardware, launch capabilities, and data collection.

== Space industry activities ==
Levykin led efforts to repatriate the Black Arrow rocket, the only British rocket to successfully launch a satellite into orbit, bringing it back to the UK after 48 years in Australia. He also initiated a challenge to locate and recover the British Prospero satellite. Additionally, Skyrora developed the Orbital Transfer Vehicle (OTV), designed for satellite servicing, refueling, and space debris removal.

Volodymyr Levykin advocates for environmental regulations for the space industry and neutralising the carbon impact of rocket fuel. He invested in the development of Ecosene, a rocket fuel produced from recycled plastic waste, such as polystyrene. Which generates up to 45% fewer greenhouse gas emissions compared to traditional kerosene and can also be used in aviation. Skyrora received environmental recognition from Iceland in 2020.

Levykin has been named among the UK's top spacetech leaders in the SpaceTech Report 2021 by the UK-based Deep Knowledge Analytics agency. For his sustainability-directed activities, he was recognised as Entrepreneur of the Year in Aerospace & Defense by The Stevie Awards.

Levykin was named “Satellite Personality of the Year” by the Society of Satellite Professionals International (SSPI) UK in 2024.

Since 2017, Levykin has supported STEM education initiatives, allocating over £500,000 to programs encouraging young people in the UK to pursue careers in science, technology, engineering, and mathematics.
