= Orbex =

Aerospace company in the United Kingdom

Orbital Express Launch Ltd.
- Type: Commercial launch services
- Industry: Aerospace
- Founded: 2015; 11 years ago as Moonspike Ltd
- Founder: Chris Larmour, Kristian von Bengtson
- Defunct: February 18, 2026
- Fate: bought by Omnidea
- Headquarters: Forres, Scotland, United Kingdom
- Key people: Phillip Chambers (CEO)
- Products: Prime launch vehicle
- Number of employees: 170 (2024)
- Website: orbex.space

Orbital Express Launch Ltd., or Orbex, was a United Kingdom-based aerospace company that was developing commercial orbital launch vehicles, namely a small rocket called Prime and a medium-lift rocket called Proxima. Orbex was headquartered in Forres, Moray, in Scotland and had subsidiaries in Denmark and Germany. Orbex planned to build its future launch complex, Sutherland spaceport, on the A' Mhòine peninsula in the county of Sutherland, northern Scotland, if and when deemed necessary. After failed takeover talks with The Exploration Company, Orbex began insolvency proceedings in February 2026. The company ceased operations on 18 February 2026.

== Launch site ==
Orbex initially intended to share the Sutherland spaceport in northern Scotland with Lockheed Martin, who at the time did not have a launch vehicle, but their strategic shareholding in Rocket Lab led to speculation that they would launch with the Rocket Lab Electron rocket, but since the two vehicles (Electron and Prime) use different propellants, the two companies would have separate launch pads while sharing some common infrastructure. The planning application for the site, however, includes only one launchpad. Lockheed Martin then moved their launch plans to a competing site, SaxaVord Spaceport, in the Shetland Isles. Orbex also planned to launch from a future spaceport in the Portuguese Azores.

== Timeline ==
The company was founded in 2015 as Moonspike Ltd., with the goal of crowdfunding a private spacecraft mission to the Moon. A Kickstarter campaign running from 1 October to 1 November 2015 raised less than £79,000 out of a goal of £600,000, rendering Moonspike ineligible for the funds. Moonspike was renamed Orbital Express Launch Ltd. in 2016, with the company now aiming to provide commercial launch services of nano- and microsatellites, especially CubeSats, to polar and Sun-synchronous low Earth orbits.

In July 2018, Orbex secured £30 million in public and private funding for the development of its orbital rocket system, named Prime. In October 2022 Orbex closed a £40.4 million Series C funding round. Orbex has opened a factory for Prime in Forres, Scotland that employs 150 people.

In April 2024, it was reported that the company received $20.7 million in a Series D funding round, with the bulk of the funds going towards development of the Prime launch vehicle. In November 2024, Orbex announced that the first launch of Prime would be conducted from SaxaVord Spaceport instead of Sutherland.

In July 2025, Orbex was preselected, along with four other European companies, by ESA for its European Launcher Challenge with funding of up to €169 million per company.

In December 2025, The Exploration Company (TEC) entered talks to acquire Orbex, with the companies signing a letter of intent in January 2026, but in February 2026 talks collapsed; Financial Times reported this was after TEC "failed to win UK government funding for its high-thrust rocket engine programme, according to two people close to the situation." After talks collapsed, Orbex entered insolvency proceedings.

Orbex's Danish subsidiary went bankrupt in January 2026 with the company ceasing operations on 18 February 2026. Its assets would be purchased by the Portuguese spacecraft component manufacturer Omnidea on 2 October.

== See also ==
- Skyrora, another British launch service provider
- Rocket Lab, a US and New Zealand based smallsat launch provider
- Black Arrow, a retired British rocket
- PLD Space, another European smallsat launcher based in Spain
- Private spaceflight
