= A' Mhòine =

Peninsula in the Highlands, Scotland

- IUCN category IV (habitat/species management area)
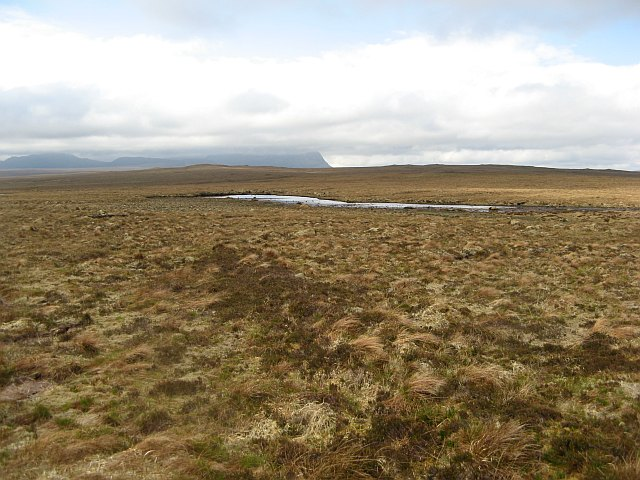
- A view across the blanket bog, towards Ben Hope

- Location within Sutherland Location within the United Kingdom
- Location: Sutherland, Highland, Scotland
- Coordinates: 58.5107°N 4.5121°W
- Area: 59.95 km^{2} (23.15 sq mi)
- Governing body: NatureScot

A' Mhòine (Scottish Gaelic: [ә.ˈvɔːɲә]), variously anglicised as the Moine, the Moin, or the Mhoine, is a peninsula in the north of Sutherland in the Highlands, Scotland. The peninsula is bounded to the west by Loch Eriboll, and to the east by the Kyle of Tongue. The A838 road crosses the peninsula on an east–west axis. The coastline includes cliffs, waterfalls, and a few sandy beaches.

Much of the peninsula is owned by Melness Estate on behalf of 59 crofters. Most of the population live in Melness, which is made up of several crofting townships and hamlets including Talmine and Midfield.

The name is from the Scottish Gaelic mòine, meaning "moss" or "peat". The Moinian geological group and the Moine Thrust Belt were in turn named after the peninsula.

== Conservation areas ==
The peninsula contains large areas of blanket bog, forming part of the Flow Country. Eriboll East and Whiten Head, at the western and northern sides of the peninsula, are designated as part of a special landscape area, and two Sites of Special Scientific Interest (SSSIs) cover a large proportion of the peninsula. One of these includes Ben Hutig and a section of the northern cliffs, and is of interest for its blanket bog, Alpine heath plants,and geology. The other covers a further 5,964 hectares (14,740 acres) of blanket bog and the birds that breed there.

A'Mhòine sits within both a Special Protection Area and a Special Area of Conservation titled the Caithness and Sutherland Peatlands, and is home to golden eagles, greylag geese, dunlin and other wading birds, as well as "rare water-dependent plants, dwarf shrubs and alpine heath".

== Ben Hutig ==
The 408 m (1,339 ft) peak of Ben Hutig rises on the peninsula, with a ridge descending towards the northern cliffs. Sitting at the northern end of the Moine Thrust Belt, the hill has numerous rocky outcrops that exemplify that belt's geology, and more examples can be seen in the nearby cliffs.

Around the peak are the remains of a "Colby camp", named after 19th century surveyor Thomas Frederick Colby, who visited the hill in 1838 as part of the Trigonometrical Survey of Scotland. Ben Hutig is one of the last hills he surveyed. The camp comprises several dry stone walls and, unusually, a set of steps leading into an enclosure on the summit. That enclosure now contains a more recent triangulation station.

== Crossing routes ==
There are two established routes across the peninsula. The A838 crosses the centre of the peninsula from Tongue to Hope. It largely follows a route commissioned by the Duke of Sutherland in 1830, and passes the ruins of Moine House, a small building "erected for the refuge of the traveller". It is now part of the North Coast 500 touring route, and deviates slightly from the Duke of Sutherland's road in places following upgrades in the late 20th century.

To the south of the peninsula, a wide track known as the Moine path runs for 18.5 km (11.5 miles) between Strathmore Hope Road and Kinloch Lodge, where it joins the road around the Kyle of Tongue. The path runs around the northern end of Ben Hope and is popular with walkers. Its origins are unclear but it is thought to have been a drovers' road.

== Sutherland spaceport project ==
In 2018, the peninsula was selected by Highlands and Islands Enterprise as the site for Sutherland spaceport, which would be the United Kingdom's first spaceport.

Permission to build the spaceport was opposed by a holding objection from the Wildland company of billionaire Danish couple Anne and Anders Povlson, who argued that the area is protected under the Ramsar Convention, a 1971 treaty covering internationally important wetlands, ratified by the UK in 1976. The Melness Estate is in favour of the project, however, as rent from the spaceport and profit-sharing could help fund efforts to regenerate the peat bog and invest in the local community.

In June 2020, The Highland Council provided planning permission for the £17 million project, allowing 12 launches a year. Ground was broken for the build on 5 May 2023.
