= Rocket Factory Augsburg =

German New Space start-up

Rocket Factory Augsburg AG
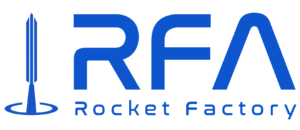
- Type: Privately held company
- Industry: Aerospace
- Founded: August 2018; 8 years ago
- Founder: Jörn Spurmann; Stefan Brieschenk
- Fate: Active
- Headquarters: Augsburg, Germany
- Products: RFA One
- Number of employees: 200 (2023)
- Website: www.rfa.space

Rocket Factory Augsburg AG (RFA) is a German NewSpace start-up located in Augsburg. It was founded in 2018 with the mission to "build rockets just like cars". RFA is headquartered in Augsburg, close to Munich, with composite material manufacturing in Portugal, test facilities in Sweden and Scotland, and a launch facility in Scotland. Its multistage rocket, RFA One, is currently under development. As of November 2023, it had been scheduled to launch during the summer of 2024; however, an anomaly during a first stage static fire test in August 2024 resulted in destruction of the stage, and the launch has been postponed.

== History ==
=== General ===
Rocket Factory Augsburg was founded as a spin-off of OHB SE in 2018 by Jörn Spurmann (CCO of RFA), Stefan Brieschenk (COO of RFA), Hans Steiniger (CEO of MT Aerospace) and Marco Fuchs (CEO of OHB SE). As of 2021, Spurmann, Brieschenk, Steiniger, Fuchs, Stefan Tweraser (CEO of RFA), and Jean-Jacques Dordain (Chairman) made up the board of RFA. OHB SE and Apollo Capital Partners GmbH are investors.

In March 2021, RFA relocated to a new headquarters facility in Augsburg. The company employs more than 300 people from more than 45 countries.

In April 2022, RFA won the second round of the "DLR microlauncher competition". As part of this contract RFA will launch 150 kg for the German Aerospace Center (DLR) aboard each of the first two RFA One flights. RFA will also receive €11 million to further the development of its launch vehicle.

Testing of the assembled RFA One vehicle began in August 2021 with cryogenic pressure testing on a prototype first stage, and hot fire tests of the Helix rocket engine began in July 2022, with an integrated stage+engine system test of 280 seconds duration in March 2023. By May 2024, a hot fire test with five Helix engines was performed at SaxaVord Spaceport.

On Monday, 19 August 2024, a static fire test of the RFA One first stage with all nine engines, the same hardware that was slated to fly on the maiden flight of RFA One, was performed. An anomaly occurred that resulted in a fire, subsequent explosion, loss of the stage, and significant damage to the launch mount. Ground testing of a new RFA One launch vehicle was slated for 2025, and 2025 was also the revised estimate for an initial orbital launch attempt.

On 7 July 2025, the European Space Agency (ESA) announced that it had preselected Rocket Factory Augsburg as one of the five candidates for the European Launcher Challenge.

=== Locations ===
Since March 2021, the main factory and offices have been located at Berliner Allee 65, Augsburg. The company has a team based at the rocket engine development and test site Esrange in Kiruna, Sweden. Since June 2021 RFA has had a Portuguese subsidiary, "RFA Portugal Unipessoal LDA," located in Matosinhos, to develop and qualify composite structures for RFA One.

SaxaVord Spaceport RFA launch site
Location
- Launch site location on Unst island, shown within the Shetland Islands, Scotland, UK
- OS grid reference: HP600091
- Coordinates: 60.818091°N 0.771597°W

Administration
- Country: Scotland
- Sovereign state: United Kingdom

In January 2023, RFA announced that it had secured exclusive access to Launch Pad Fredo at the SaxaVord Spaceport in Scotland. The company said that the multi-year partnership included a "double-digit million pound investment" in SaxaVord by RFA. The company will use the facility to launch RFA One launch vehicle to polar and Sun-synchronous orbits. The maiden flight of the RFA One is planned to be launched from SaxaVord.

On 29 January 2024, RFA announced plans to launch rockets monthly from SaxaVord Spaceport on Unst in the Shetland Islands, aiming to be Europe's first-ever launch delivering a satellite into orbit. After a static fire test anomaly in August 2024, the company anticipates its initial launch in 2025, following extensive testing and assembly in Augsburg and on-site preparation.

== Projects ==
=== RFA One launch vehicle ===
Rocket Factory Augsburg's first launch vehicle is RFA One, a three-stage rocket designed to launch small satellites and payloads of up to 1,300 kg into polar orbits. The vehicle is 30 m (98 ft) long with a diameter of 2 m (6 ft 7 in). It has been in development since 2019. The vehicle is designed to transport small and micro-satellites into Low Earth orbit (LEO) and Sun-synchronous orbit (SSO).

The first stage is powered by nine Helix engines, each producing 100 kN of thrust. The second stage will use one engine, a vacuum-optimised version of the Helix engine. The Helix engine uses rocket-grade kerosene, known as RP-1, fuel and liquid oxygen oxidizer. During 2020 the company redesigned Helix from a gas-generator cycle to an oxygen-rich staged combustion cycle. Some components used in early engine versions, such as the turbopump, were bought from the Ukrainian company Pivdenmash to shorten development time. Later versions of these components have been developed internally.

The third stage, named Redshift, will function as an orbital transfer vehicle (OTV). Since its Fenix engine can be fired multiple times, it is able to reach different orbits within a single flight and complete different missions for different customers. It will use a non-hydrazine based, relightable green propellant.

=== Argo cargo spacecraft ===
In 2023, RFA unveiled the plans for manufacturing a space station cargo vehicle, named Argo. It would be 3.7 m in diameter and 7.7 m long, have a dry mass of 5200 kg, and is supposed to carry up to 15.5 cubic meters and 4,000 kg of cargo. The capsule would be equipped with an Inflatable Atmospheric Decelerator (IAD) on its back end, provided by Atmos Space Cargo, allowing the entire vehicle to return to Earth. Propulsion would be provided by two Fenix engines used on Redshift, and 24 RCS thrusters, while power would be provided by four solar panels. Argo's first demo mission was planned for 2028.

=== PROTEIN heavy lifter study ===
In 2023, RFA participated in ESA's PROTEIN study, calling for the creation of a concept of a heavy lift launch vehicle capable of carrying up to 10,000 tons of cargo to low-Earth orbit per year, while not exceeding a recurring cost of €280/kg payload to orbit. RFA's concept was 7m in diameter and between 130 and 140m in length (depending on the presence or absence of a third stage), utilizing methalox engines for its 1st stage and hydrolox engines for its second stage, with both stages landing vertically.

== See also ==
- Isar Aerospace
- HyImpulse
- PLD Space
