= Skyrora =

Aerospace manufacturer in the United Kingdom

Skyrora Ltd
- Type: Private
- Industry: Space
- Founded: June 21, 2017; 9 years ago
- Founder: Volodymyr Levykin
- Headquarters: Glasgow, Scotland, UK
- Key people: Volodymyr Levykin (CEO)
- Number of employees: 160 (2022)
- Website: www.skyrora.com

Skyrora Ltd is a Scottish space launch company founded in 2017, based in Glasgow, Scotland. The company has a design and manufacturing facility in nearby Cumbernauld.

Skyrora focuses on designing and manufacturing launch vehicles for small satellites, as well as portable space launch systems. It is best known for developing technologies such as lower-emissions fuel 'Ecosene' and its Skyrora Space Tug, alongside operating the first licensed UK spaceport.

British astronaut Tim Peake together with Nick Laird, director of Bombardier, are board members at Skyrora .

== History ==
In August 2018, Skyrora successfully conducted Scotland's first commercial rocket launch by a private company at Kildermorie Estate in Ross-shire. The company launched the 1.3-metre-tall Skylark Nano rocket using an M class model rocketry motor in August 2018 and the 2-metre-tall Skylark Nano II rocket in July 2019. All rockets are designed, built, and assembled in the United Kingdom.

In 2019, Skyrora received the CleanTech award at the Go:Tech Awards for its commitment to sustainable spaceflight. In 2020, the company was recognized with the Leif Erikson Lunar Prize Award for its 'Ecosene' project, which focuses on developing an environmentally friendly rocket fuel.

In 2020, Skyrora was named Company of the Year in Aerospace & Defense among mid-size companies by the Stevie Awards, following its participation in the Space Camp accelerator programme by Seraphim Capital. The same year, Skyrora won the ‘Best Small Satellite Launch Vehicle Manufacturer Award’ at the Aviation & Aerospace Awards.

In May 2020, the company successfully conducted a static fire test of its Skylark L vehicle at a mobile launch site in Ross-shire.

In April 2021, Skyrora secured €3 million in co-funding from the European Space Agency (ESA) to support its technological advancements.

In March 2022, Skyrora announced the opening of a new rocket engine testing facility in Midlothian, Scotland, covering over 120,000 square feet. In July 2022, it expanded its capabilities by opening a new manufacturing and production facility in Cumbernauld, the largest of its kind in the UK.

In May 2022, Skyrora completed a 70 kN hot-fire test for its 3D printed rocket engine, which will be used in the company's XL launch vehicle.

In August 2022, Skyrora submitted its application to the UK Civil Aviation Authority (CAA) for a launch operator license, enabling planned orbital launches. In June 2024, the company continued its licensing efforts by submitting an Assessment of Environmental Effects (AEE) as part of the process.

In July 2023, Skyrora hosted a key meeting for the EU’s Horizon Europe Research and Innovation Program’s Made-3D project at its engine manufacturing facility near Glasgow, highlighting its contributions to additive manufacturing advancements in aerospace.

In October 2023, ESA awarded Skyrora, Viasat, and CGI a €300,000 contract to demonstrate a telemetry relay system in space, supporting enhanced data transmission capabilities. In partnership with Viasat and CGI, Skyrora successfully completed a ground test of InRange, the UK's first space-based telemetry relay system for commercial launch vehicles, in October 2024.

In November 2023, Skyrora and Spirit AeroSystems announced a collaboration to enhance orbital launch capability, with Spirit gaining access to Skyrora's Skyprint 2 hybrid 3D printer for advanced engine manufacturing.

In September 2024, Skyrora reaffirmed its commitment to sustainability by signing the "Statement for a Responsible Space Sector," an ESA-led initiative promoting responsible space activities.

Skyrora is working toward its first launch of the three-stage Skyrora XL rocket from a UK spaceport. In August 2025, the Civil Aviation Authority granted Skyrora a launch licence to launch from the SaxaVord Spaceport in Shetland. It is the first UK firm to have this licence issued.

=== Education ===
The company organised a graduate placement program in 2021 to help the graduates and young talents to get into the sector. They offered technical positions for students and summer internships.

Skyrora helped fund the retrieval of the first stages of Black Arrow R2 and R3 and provided sponsorship for the UKSEDS programme.

=== Ecological fuel ===
Skyrora has upgraded its kerosene made of unrecyclable waste plastic to be used as rocket fuel – Ecosene. The new fuel is said to produce 45 percent less greenhouse gas than traditional fuel. In February 2020, Skyrora has already used the fuel to fire its LEO engine for the final stage of Skyrora XL rocket at their engine test complex.

Skyrora started to use 3D printers to manufacture various rocketry components as a sustainable methodology of production.

In August 2025, the UK Civil Aviation Authority granted Skyrora the first vertical launch operator licence awarded to a UK-based rocket company, authorising up to 16 sub-orbital Skylark L launches per year from the CAA-licensed SaxaVord Spaceport in Shetland.

== Rockets ==
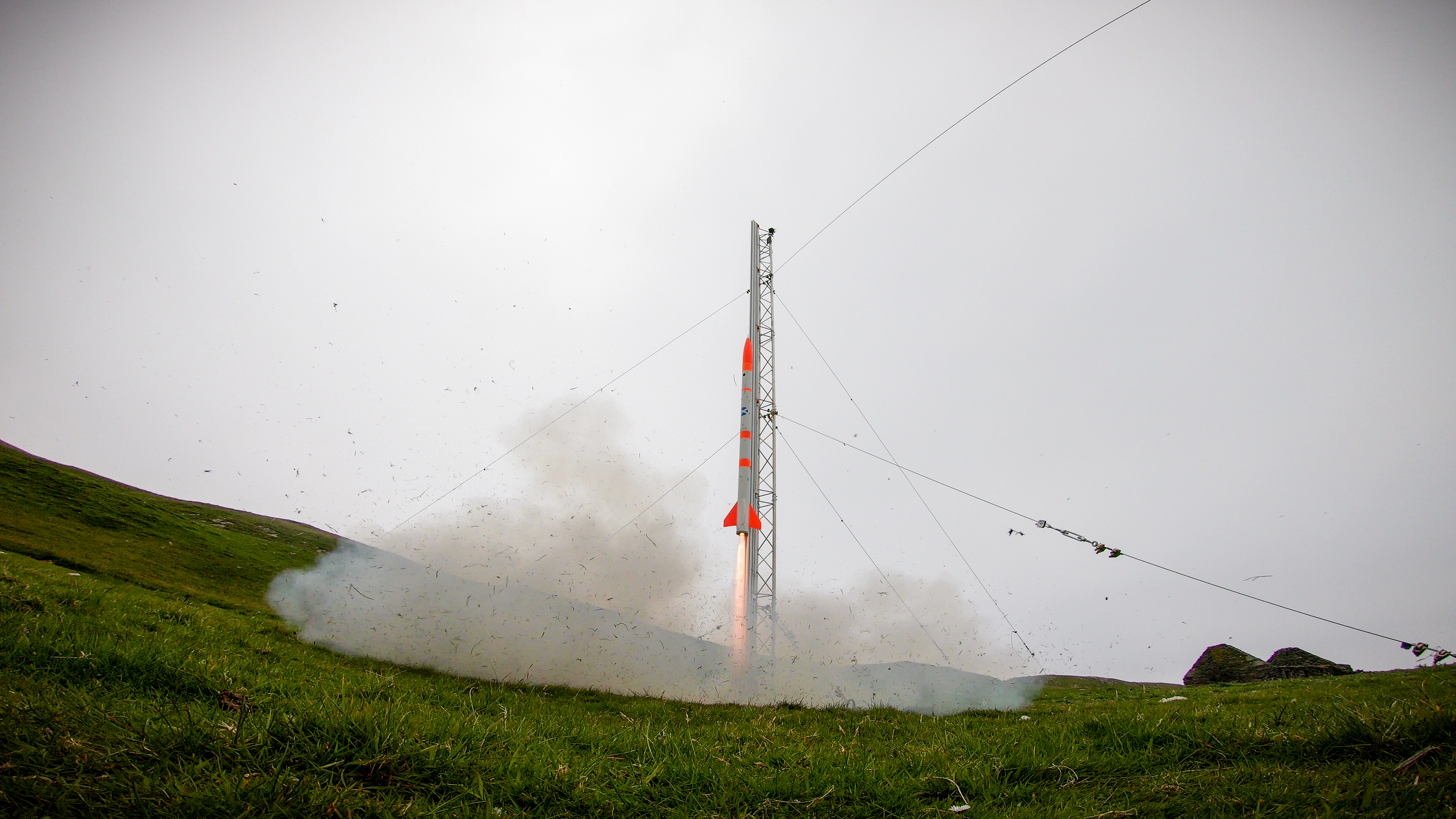
Skylark Nano III Start

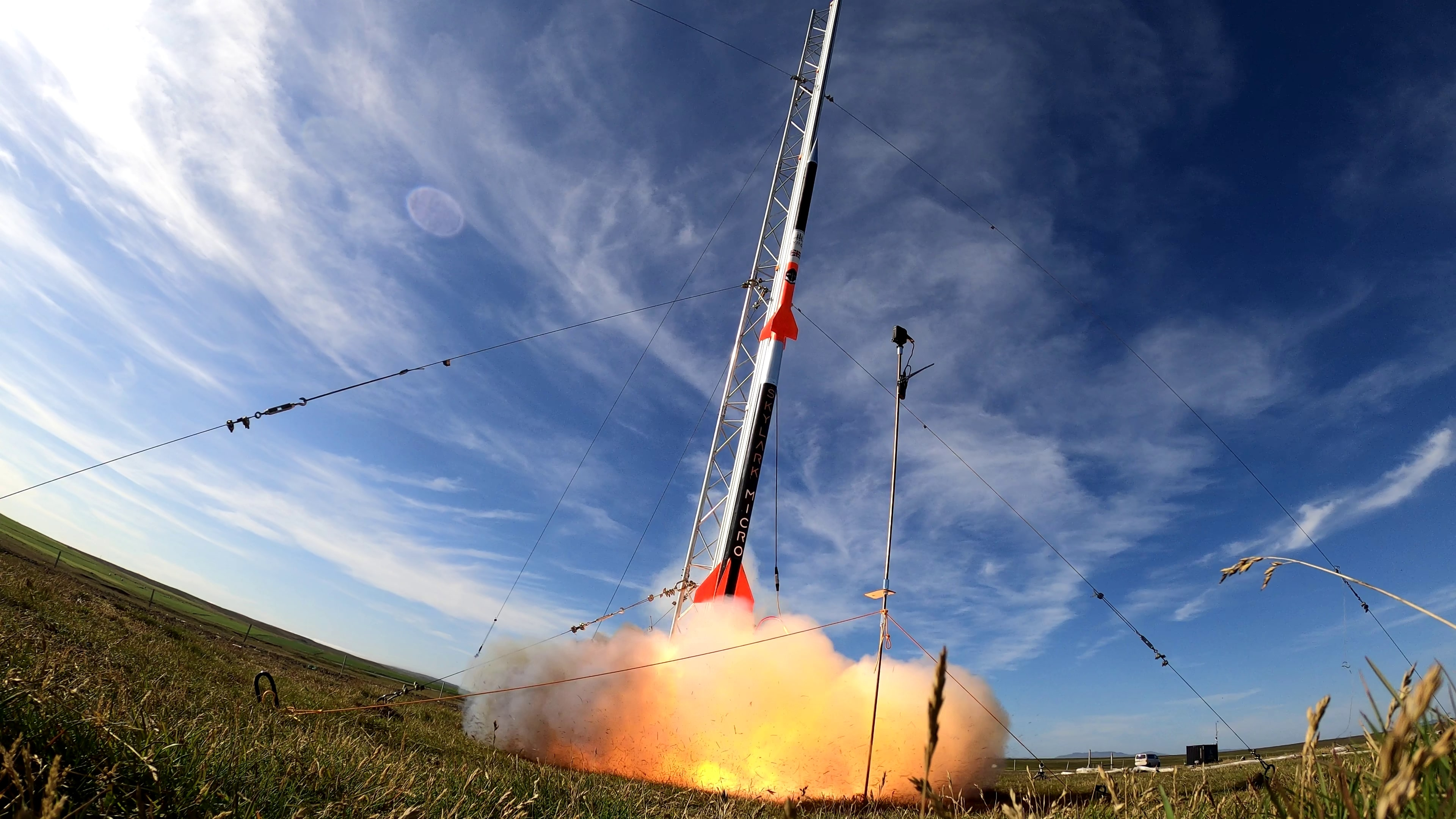
Skylark Micro start

=== Skylark Nano ===
The Skylark Nano was launched in 2020 as an unguided supersonic rocket designed for simulating a launch to then be recovered with the use of parachutes. Neither a control system nor a thrust vector control system is required.

It has been launched three times as part of Skyrora's de-risking programme in the Scottish Highlands. Following launches in 2018 and 2019, the rocket has reached an altitude of 6 km during the most recent test in Shetland.

=== Skylark Micro ===
The Skylark Micro is a two-stage supersonic rocket designed as an intermediate step between Skylark Nano and Skylark L. It was flown in August 2020, reaching an altitude of 27 km.

=== Skylark L ===
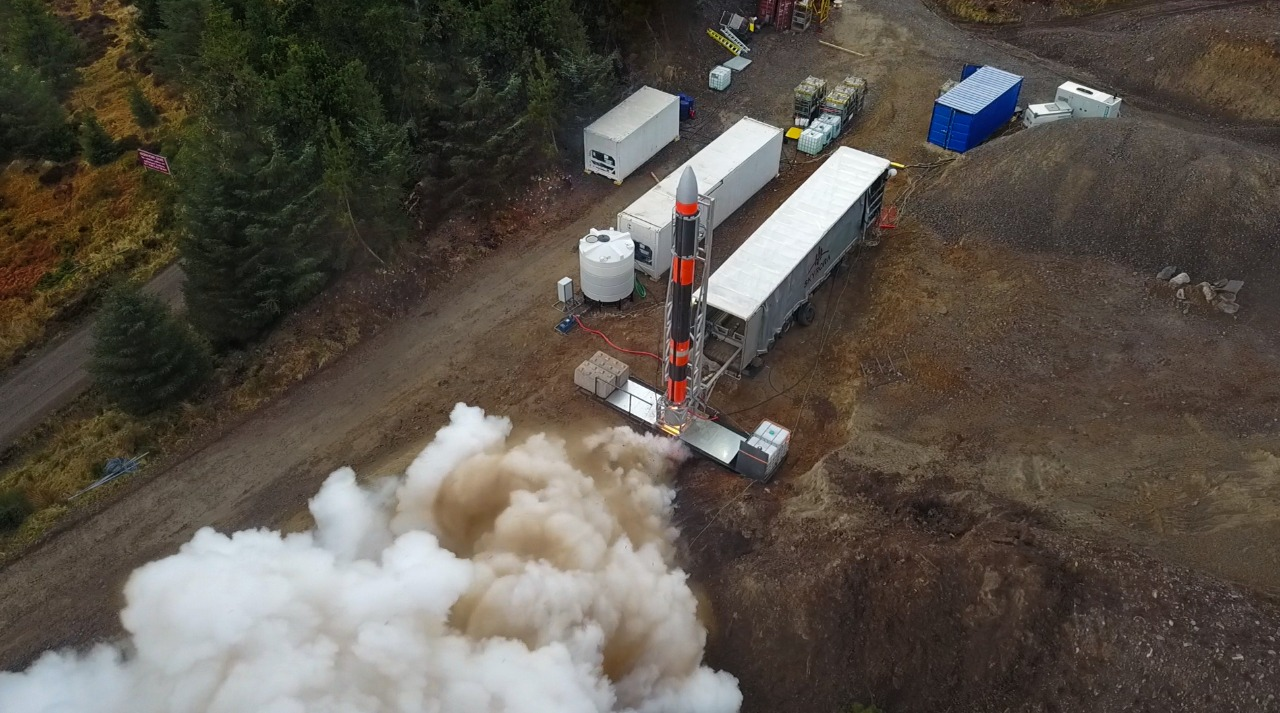
Skylark L static fire test

The Skylark L suborbital launch vehicle is the first Skyrora rocket to use a 3D printed hydrogen peroxide–kerosene engine.

It is capable of fulfilling scientific micro-gravity needs.

Skylark L was developed to launch 60 kg of payload 100 km up.

This rocket was subject to a full static fire test in May 2020 at the Kildermorie Estate in Alness, Scotland, which was the first ground rocket test in Scotland in 50 years.

On 8 October 2022 the Skylark L rocket attempted a suborbital test flight mission from Langanes (Iceland) launch site. Intended apogee was 102 km (63 mi). The vehicle experienced an anomaly shortly after lift-off, landing in the sea 500 m from the pad after reaching an altitude of only 300 meters.

=== Skyrora XL ===
The Skyrora XL is a three-stage orbital launch vehicle under development with nine hydrogen peroxide–kerosene engines of the same type used in Skylark L. The first flight is expected in 2027. It is expected that the rocket will be able to bring a payload of 315 kg to a Sun-synchronous or Polar orbit.

Skyrora has successfully tested a final stage rocket engine in its first stationary ground-firings. In April 2021, the company successfully tested the upper stage of the Skyrora XL rocket and completed a static fire test in its engine development complex in Fife. Hot-fire tests of the first stage were scheduled to take place no earlier than late 2024.

In October 2021, the company signed a multi-launch agreement with SaxaVord Spaceport to launch the Skyrora XL from that location. Skyrora also has an agreement with the Canadian launch provider Maritime Launch Services to launch Skyrora XL from Spaceport Nova Scotia.

In October 2026, Skyrora successfully conducted a hot-fire test of a scaled-down version of Skyrora XL in Machrihanish. The test was conducted to test multiple systems in the vehicle.

== Engines ==
The company has successfully tested several types of engines in 2020 and 2021:

- Skylark L Engine, a three-tonne regeneratively cooled bi-liquid rocket engine with a pressure fed system capable of generating 30 kN thrust.
- Skyforce-2, a seven-tonne engine for the first and second stage of the orbital Skyrora XL launch vehicle that uses what Skyrora refers to as "advanced turbopump techniques". It is capable of creating 70 kN thrust.
- LEO engine for Skyrora XL running on hydrogen peroxide and kerosene and producing 3.5 kN thrust, but it has also passed the successful test with Ecosene fuel. The engine is able to re-ignite several times.
- Space Tug, a vehicle that can navigate to any location in open space using its own power and perform multiple manoeuvres in space, which would be useful to remove space debris and maintain or replace satellites in orbit. The upper stage/tug engine was successfully tested in December 2020 and included three static firings of the engine and involved a full flight-ready test involving software and avionics employed in an actual launch. The test was performed at its test site in Fife.
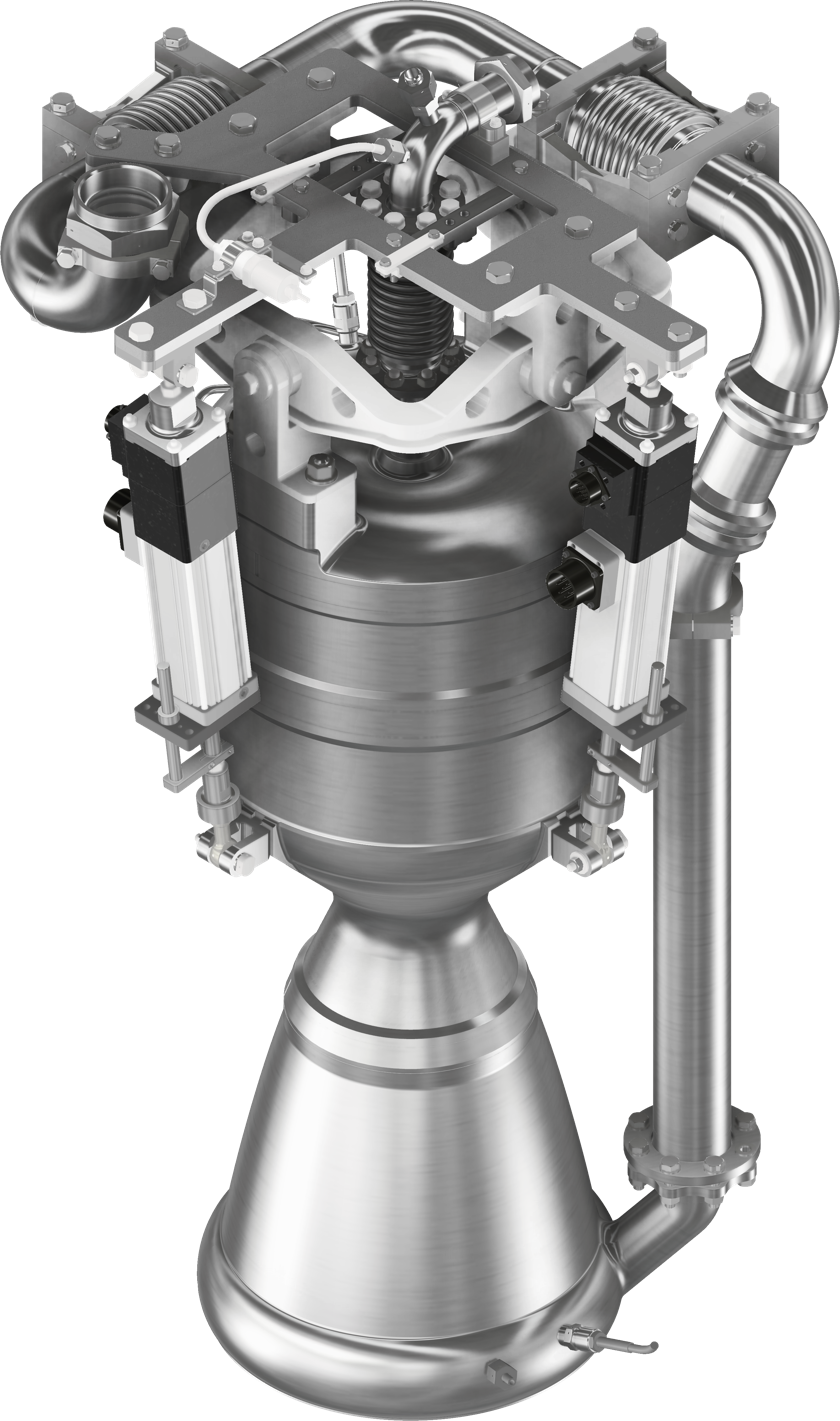

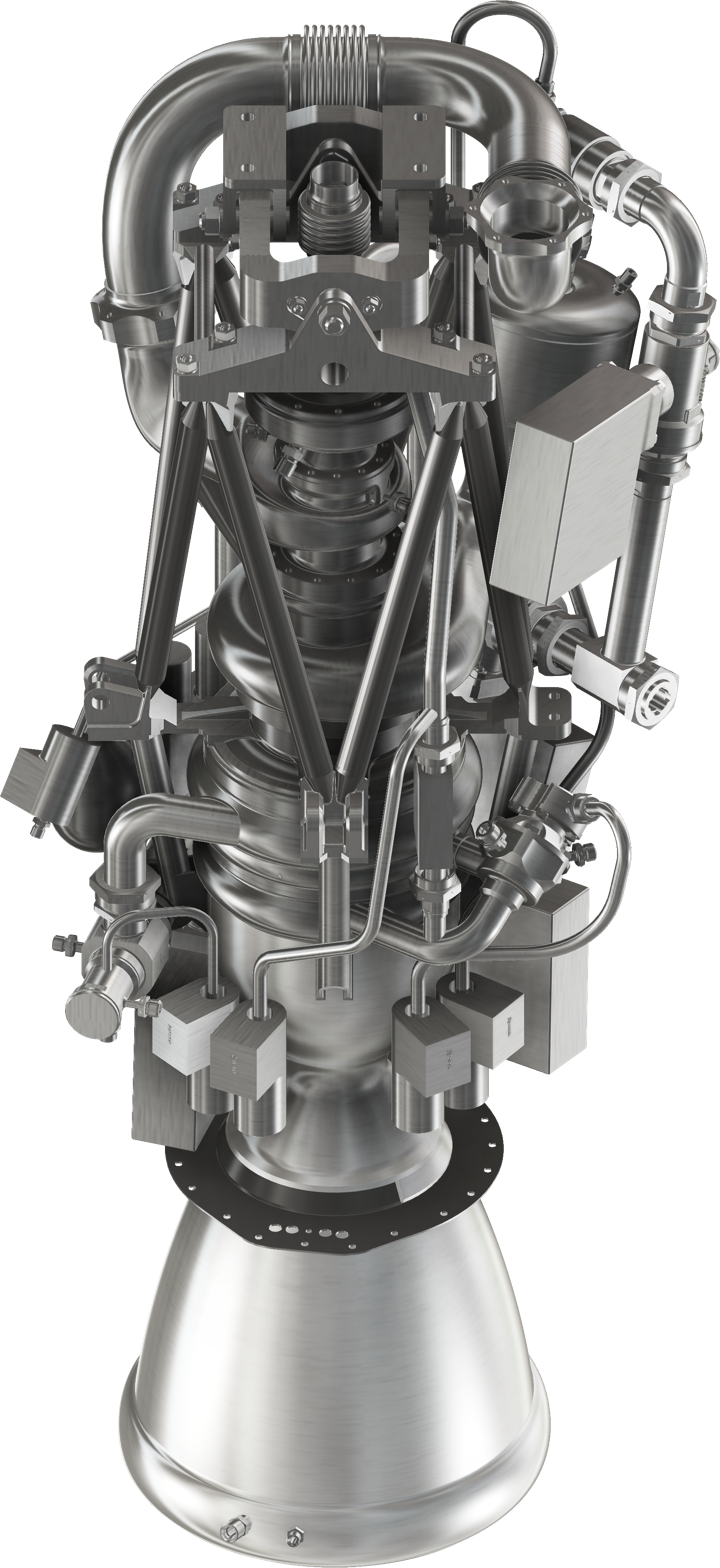

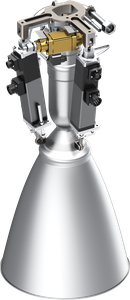

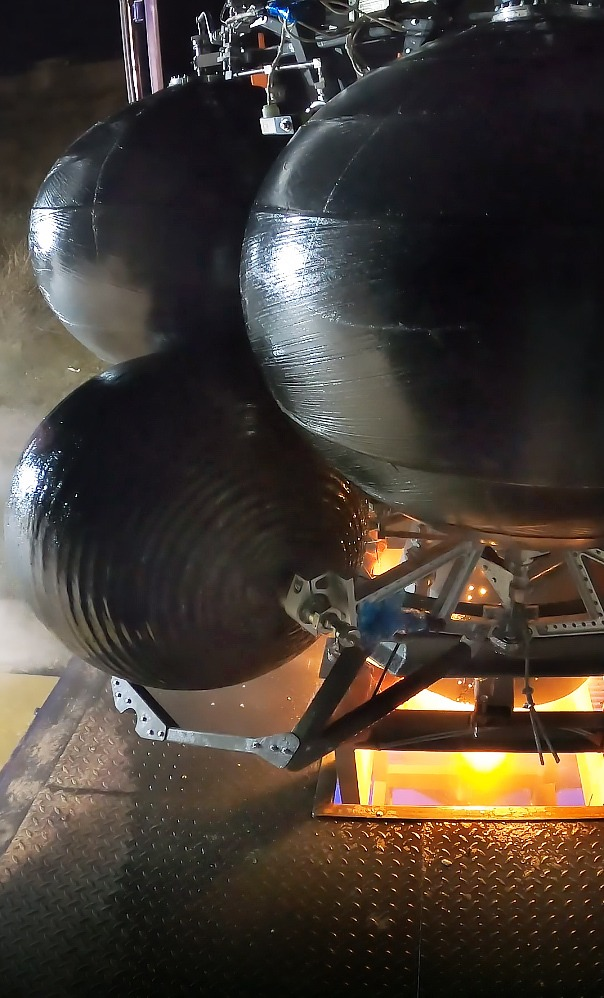

== See also ==
- Skylark (British sounding rocket series)
- Space industry of Scotland
