= RFA One =

In development multistage small launch vehicle

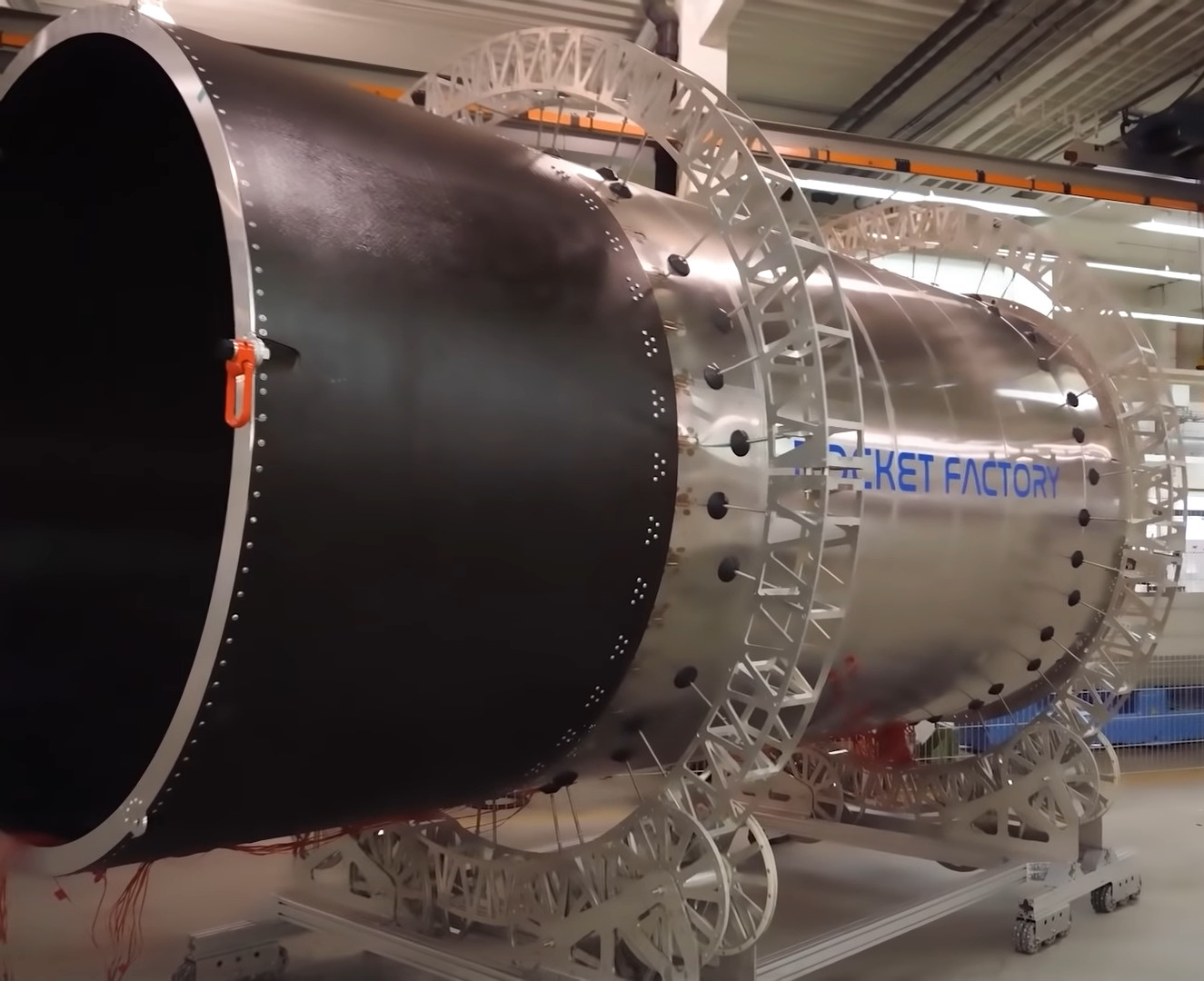
- RFA One second stage
- Function: Orbital launch vehicle
- Manufacturer: Rocket Factory Augsburg
- Country of origin: Germany
- Cost per launch: €3 million

Size
- Height: 30 m (98 ft)
- Diameter: 2 m (6 ft 7 in)
- Stages: 3

Capacity

Payload to LEO
- Mass: 1,600 kg (3,500 lb)

Payload to SSO
- Altitude: 500 km (310 mi)
- Mass: 1,300 kg (2,900 lb)

Payload to polar orbit
- Altitude: 2,000 km (1,200 mi)
- Mass: 850 kg (1,870 lb)

Payload to MEO
- Altitude: 6,000 km (3,700 mi)
- Mass: 500 kg (1,100 lb)

Payload to GTO
- Mass: 450 kg (990 lb)

Payload to TLI
- Mass: 300 kg (660 lb)

Payload to GEO
- Mass: 150 kg (330 lb)

Launch history
- Status: In development
- Launch sites: SaxaVord
- First flight: 2026 (planned)

First stage
- Powered by: 9 × Helix - Staged combustion cycle
- Maximum thrust: 900 kN (200,000 lb_{f})
- Specific impulse: 325 seconds (3.19 km/s)
- Propellant: RP-1/LOX

Second stage
- Powered by: 1 × Helix Vac
- Specific impulse: 350 seconds (3.4 km/s)
- Propellant: RP-1/LOX

Third stage – Redshift
- Powered by: 1 × Fenix
- Maximum thrust: 1.5 kN (340 lb_{f})
- Propellant: Nitromethane/Nitrous oxide

Helix
- Country of origin: Germany
- Designer: Pivdenmash, Rocket Factory Augsburg
- Manufacturer: Rocket Factory Augsburg
- Application: Booster stage engines; Upper stage engine
- Predecessor: RD-809K
- Status: In development

Liquid-fuel engine
- Propellant: LOX / RP-1
- Cycle: Staged combustion

Performance
- Thrust, sea-level: 100 kN (22,000 lbf)

Used in
- RFA One

RFA One is a small-lift multistage launch vehicle with an on-orbit transfer stage designed to transport small and micro-satellites of up to 1,300 kg into low-Earth polar and Sun-synchronous orbits. It has been in development by German private company Rocket Factory Augsburg since 2019.

The vehicle is 30 m (98 ft) long with a diameter of 2 m (6 ft 7 in). Both main stages use RP-1 fuel and liquid oxygen oxidizer, while the transfer stage uses storable propellants.

Initially aiming to launch in 2022—with subsequent delays moving the target to 2024—following an anomaly on a ground test stand in August 2024, its maiden launch was slated for 10 August 2026, however, the rocket suffered a last minute tank leak prompting another delay.

== Description ==
The first stage is powered by nine Helix engines, each producing 100 kN (22,000 lb_{f}) of thrust. The second stage will use a vacuum-optimised version of the Helix engine. The Helix engine uses rocket grade kerosene, known as RP-1, fuel and liquid oxygen oxidizer. During 2020 the company redesigned Helix from a gas-generator cycle to an oxygen-rich staged combustion cycle. Some components used in early engine versions, such as the turbopump, were procured from the Ukrainian company Pivdenmash to shorten development time. Later versions of these components have been developed internally.

The third (or "orbital") stage, named Redshift, will function as an orbital transfer vehicle (OTV). Powered by an RFA-developed Fenix engine, with propellants of nitromethane fuel and nitrous oxide oxidizer the engine can be restarted multiple times on orbit. This allows the vehicle to achieve different orbits within a single flight and complete various missions for particular customers.

== Production and testing ==
The rocket is designed for serial production and is aiming to use a large number of COTS components to reduce production and launch costs. Major components of the engines of the first two stages are to be 3D printed.

In August 2021 RFA performed a cryogenic pressure test on a prototype first stage, during which the prototype burst. Three hot fire tests for performed with the Helix rocket engine with a total duration of 74 seconds in July 2022. The second stage was approved for flight operations in May 2023 through the integrated system test with 280 seconds of hot fire.

In April 2024, RFA reported successful installation of five of nine Helix engines onto RFA One's first stage in preparation for transport to SaxaVord Spaceport for hot-fire stage testing.

The first stage of the RFA One arrived in SaxaVord Spaceport in May and successfully performed its first hot fire test with five Helix engines that same month.

On Monday, 19 August 2024, a static fire test of the first stage with all nine engines, the stage that was slated to fly on the maiden flight of RFA One, experienced an anomaly that resulted in a fire, subsequent explosion, loss of the stage, and major damage to the launch mount. Ground testing of a new RFA One launch vehicle is slated for 2025, which is also the revised estimate for a first orbital launch attempt. A launch license was granted by the Civil Aviation Authority on 16 January 2025, limiting the company to 10 launches per year as well as no more than two in any given month, and requires 60 days' notice for range safety purposes.

== List of launch plans ==
Date / time (UTC)	Launch site	Payload	Orbit	User	Status
2026	SaxaVord	(Germany) AllBertEinStein; (Italy) Artica; (Germany) Curium Two; (Germany) Erminaz; (Germany) PCIOD; (Italy) Spacemind; (Germany) Spacedream	500 km SSO	Multiple users	Planned
2026	Maiden flight of RFA One.				
2026	SaxaVord	(Germany) Midas; (Germany) Spacemast; (Bulgaria) Platform 9; (Germany) Vibes Pioneer; (Poland) PW-Sat3; (Germany) Flamingo; (Spain) 3Cat-8; (Germany) Move-Beyod	500 km SSO	Multiple users	Planned
2026	Second RFA One test flight.				
