= Sutherland spaceport =

Proposed spaceport of the United Kingdom

- Artist's rendering of Orbex Prime's takeoff from the Sutherland spaceport.
- Interactive map of Sutherland spaceport
- Location: Sutherland, Scotland
- Coordinates: 58.5107°N 4.5121°W
- Operator: TBD
- Orbital inclination range: 90° (polar orbit); Sun-synchronous orbit
Launch history
- First launch: TBD
- Associated rockets: Orbex Prime

The Sutherland spaceport, also known as Space Hub Sutherland or UK Vertical Launch (UKVL) Sutherland, is a planned spaceport to be located in Sutherland in Scotland. It would be one of the first vertical launch capable spaceports in the United Kingdom, (Note: It was initially expected to be the first spaceport of any kind in the UK, but Spaceport Cornwall subsequently hosted a horizontal launch in 2023.) and operated by a commercial entity. The spaceport was intended to support the Orbex Prime launch vehicle. The spaceport site is on the A' Mhòine peninsula northwest of Tongue village, Sutherland, Scotland. Groundbreaking occurred on 5 May 2023. In December 2024, Orbex announced that the project had been put on hold.

== Overview ==
The facility would be operated by a commercial Launch Pad Operator, and Orbex was given a lease to both build and operate the spaceport in 2022. The proposed spaceport was expected to employ some 40 people directly and with another 400 jobs supported indirectly. Initial development was through the local development agency, the Highlands and Islands Enterprise (HIE).

The submitted planning application shows that the spaceport would host a planned new rocket called Prime by the startup company Orbex. The facility was originally planned to be shared by both Orbex and Lockheed Martin, and to potentially use two separate launch pads, as the two rockets use different propellants. However, the final planning application includes only one launch pad. In October 2020, the UK Space Agency announced that Lockheed Martin had selected Shetland Space Centre on Unst, while Orbex remained at Sutherland.

== Location ==
The proposed site for the spaceport is on the north coast of Scotland, north of the A838 on the Mhòine peninsula.
- LSIF=Launch Site Integration Facility
- LOCC=Launch Operations Control Centre

The location at A' Mhòine peninsula was considered alongside two other Scottish locations: Unst, Shetland and North Uist, Western Isles, and is the only one of these three on the mainland. For all three locations the particular value is in having a clear northern coast which allows rockets to launch due north without problems from land areas under the flight path. The northerly flight path can place small satellites into polar orbit and Sun-synchronous orbit. The site is 35 miles (56 km) from the closed Dounreay nuclear research reactor, and HIE is seeking £5 million of Nuclear Decommissioning grants to offset the loss of Dounreay jobs.

The nearest community to the spaceport is the crofting township of Talmine, alongside the Kyle of Tongue, with a population of 200. The space hub proposed site is within the 2,464 acres (997 ha) Melness Crofters Estate, of which 13 acres (5.3 ha) will be leased to HIE and enclosed to secure the spaceport infrastructure. The surrounding land is common grazing for the crofters, who will be required (with due compensation) to clear livestock from a wider exclusion zone on launch days. Permission has been granted for a maximum of 12 launches per year from the spaceport.

== Launch operation ==
Although the spaceport applications and permissions were completed by HIE, a development agency, a commercial operator was always intended, and in 2022 the site was subleased to Orbex who had originally been involved as one of the rocket suppliers. By 2020 Orbex was the only launch company expecting to use the site, with plans for a single launch pad with up to 12 launches a year of their Orbex Prime rockets. Using bio-propane, the Orbex Prime rocket aimed to have a significantly lower carbon impact compared to other rocket fuels. The rockets and engines were to be made at Orbex's Forres manufacturing plant, near Inverness, using 3D printing. They were aiming for re-usability for the booster stage, and full mass recovery so that no rocket materials are left on land or sea or in space. The first three launches would carry payloads up to 125 kg, to allow for testing margins and extra instrumentation. Amongst the six contracts that Orbex had signed up for satellite launches is In-Space Missions, who have booked the second flight for the launch of their Faraday-2b spacecraft which itself holds six or more cubesats. When fully operational the Orbex Prime was expected to have a payload capacity of 180 kg.

The spaceport expected to occupy some 13 acres (5.3 ha) of land to be leased from the Melness Crofters Estate, forming three enclosed areas within the common grazing moorland of the 2,464 acres (997 ha) estate. Around launch days the crofters would be required, with due compensation, to clear their livestock from an exclusion zone.

The three enclosed areas are accessed from a new roadway built in 2024, running north-west from the A838. Alongside the entranceway will be the Launch Operations Control Centre (LOCC). This is to have low visual impact from the road, with a planted green roof housing facilities to control the launch, and panoramic glass windows facing towards the launchpad. Some 2 km north-west is the Launch Site Integration Facility (LSIF), including a building for assembly of launch vehicles and their payloads, and an antennae park with satellite tracking and telemetry equipment. Around 0.5 km north of the LSIF, linked by an access rail, will be the launchpad, incorporating facilities for storage and management of the bio-propane and liquid oxygen.

== History ==
The proposed site was first announced in July 2018 at the Farnborough Air Show and had hoped it might be ready for first launches in 2020. The project was initially called UKVL Sutherland, with the development agency Highlands and Islands Enterprise (HIE) working in conjunction with the UK Space Agency, and two potential launch operators, Orbex and Lockheed Martin. The proposed cost of the spaceport construction was £17.3 million, with £2.5 million to be provided by the UK government. The expectation was that two launch pads would be required, to cope with the different fuel types, namely bio-propane for Orbex, and RP-1 for Lockheed Martin's as yet undisclosed vehicle.

Initially there was mixed support amongst the local crofters. In November 2018, the Melness Crofters Estate (MCE) voted on whether to continue discussions about the proposal. Twenty-seven votes were cast in favour, with eighteen against and one spoiled ballot.

On 31 July 2019 HIE signed a lease for the proposed site with the Melness Crofters Estate and in September 2019 they began a formal public consultation phase, ahead of the formal application for planning consent, which was filed in December 2019. Planning permission was granted by Highland Council on 5 August 2020 after the Scottish government chose to make no interventions on the decision. Application had then to be made to the Scottish Land Court to get permission to enclose the common grazing land, at a hearing still to held. With regulator approval to move forward, construction was planned to begin in 2021 with the hope of a first launch before the end of 2022. However, Groundbreaking on the site didn't start until May 2023 with an estimated completion of around August 2024. The planning consent was for a single launchpad and an upper limit of 12 flights per year.

In October 2020 Lockheed Martin announced that they were pulling out of the Sutherland Space Hub partnership and had shifted their plans in favour of a launch from the Shetland Space Centre (SSC) on the island of Unst. The reasons for this appear to relate to the difficulties of having only a single launch pad and a restricted number of launch dates. By using the Shetland site, which aims to be specifically geared up for multiple launch providers with potentially three launch pads and fewer launch restrictions, Lockheed Martin hoped to avoid the possible backlog of launch dates that might have resulted at Sutherland Space Hub.

A legal attempt to overturn the planning permission was made by Anders Holch Povlsen's company 'Wildland', which was rejected by the court in 2022. With the legalities resolved HIE was able to sub-lease, for 50 years, the spaceport site for the construction and operational phases of the project to Orbex, the company that is also developing the rockets and engines that will be launched there. A £30 million funding round was followed by the appointment of Jacobs Solutions as main contractors and on 4 May 2023 Orbex announced a 'ground-breaking' milestone, marking the start of the construction phase.

In December 2024, Orbex announced that construction of the spaceport had been put on indefinite hold, with the first Prime launches to be conducted from SaxaVord Spaceport instead. Orbex went insolvent and stopped operations in February 2026.

== See also ==
- SaxaVord Spaceport (formerly Shetland Space Centre)
- Space industry of Scotland
