= SaxaVord Spaceport =

Spaceport on Unst, Scotland

Coordinates: 60.8184°N 0.7692°W

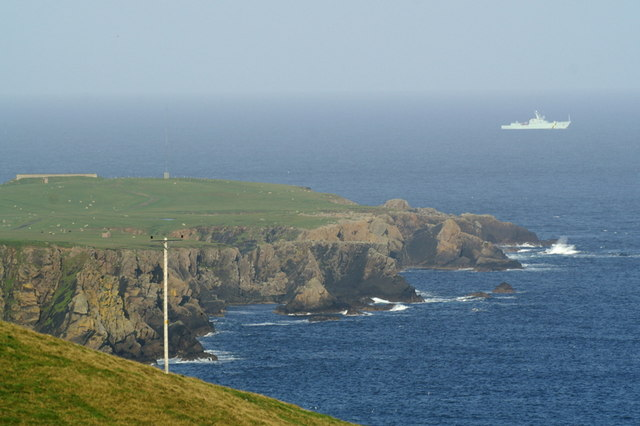
- site on Lamba Ness
- Interactive map of SaxaVord Spaceport
- Location: Lamba Ness, Shetland, Scotland
- Operator: https://saxavord.com
Launch history
- First launch: 2026 (planned)
- Associated rockets: Skyrora XL, ABL RS1, Latitude Zephyr, Lockheed Martin UK Pathfinder, Astra, RFA One

SaxaVord Spaceport, previously known as Shetland Space Centre is a spaceport located on the Lamba Ness peninsula on Unst, the most northerly of the inhabited Shetland Islands off the coast of Scotland. The spaceport occupies the former RAF Skaw, a disused WWII radar base which was part of RAF Saxa Vord radar station.

== History ==
A report from the UK Space Agency initially identified the site as offering clear northbound trajectories (Note: Most spacefaring nations launch only towards the open ocean, to ensure no risk to human populations in the event of a malfunction.) for polar and sun-synchronous orbits, with the highest potential payload of any location in the UK.

Lockheed Martin initially expressed interest in flying their UK Pathfinder satellite launch system from the proposed spaceport. The proposed launch vehicle under this programme is the RS1 from ABL Space Systems, a US-based company developing 27 m tall rockets capable of carrying payloads up to 1000 kg into a sun-synchronous orbit. The UK Pathfinder Launch programme is supported by £23.5 million of UK Space Agency grants.

The launch site is also planned to be used by HyImpulse Technologies, a German rocket maker, who were initially aiming for engine and suborbital testing by the end of 2021, with orbital launches originally hoped for by 2023. In October 2021, Skyrora signed a multi-launch contract over the next decade for SaxaVord, originally intending to begin satellite launches in 2022.

In November 2025, the first launch was delayed to 2026.

The spaceport is sited on Lamba Ness, on the north east edge of Unst, the most northerly of the inhabited Shetland Islands.

== Development ==
Plans for the spaceport were submitted to Shetland Islands Council by Farningham Planning in January 2021 to enable up to 30 launches per year. The proposal is for three rocket launch pads on Lamba Ness peninsula with additional infrastructure such as a satellite tracking facility, rocket hangars and integration facilities. The plans also document proposals for a Range Control Centre at the former RAF SaxaVord complex, fuel storage facilities at Ordale Airport at Baltasound, and improvements to the launch site's approach roads.

On 29 March 2021, Historic Environment Scotland (HES), a statutory body, refused consent for the development of the spaceport on the grounds it would impact a scheduled monument of national significance – the Chain Home radar station at Skaw. The refusal of consent carried significant legal weight, as it is a criminal offence to carry out works to a scheduled monument without such authorisation. Due to the almost one-to-one overlap of the monument location with the proposed spaceport, this refusal led to concerns being voiced about the viability of the spaceport project. In January 2022, HES withdrew the objection, stating "We recognise the benefits that this development will bring to the community in Unst".

Launches from the site would result in the rockets being discarded in the sea to the north of Shetland, and there are no plans to recover these. While the operators claim these may form artificial reefs, there are also "serious concerns" from the fishing industry in Shetland, about these causing damage to nets and vessels.

Launches will also require an exclusion zone in areas used for commercial fishing, and since they require good weather this will likely impact local fishing over the summer months. While the exclusion zone is relatively local to the site, the hazard area where debris could land is much larger, covering a significant portion of the Norwegian Sea and almost reaching Jan Mayen island, which is over 1,100 km (700 mi) to the north.

== Proposed operators and licensing ==
In January 2023, German company Rocket Factory Augsburg signed a multi-year launch agreement which would give exclusive access to the northernmost launch pad of the spaceport, Launch Pad Fredo, with testing of the RFA One core stage beginning in mid-2023 and a first launch scheduled as early as late 2023.

In May 2023, spaceport CEO Frank Strang announced a new $137 million debt financing package during a UK Parliamentary Science and Technology Committee hearing. The source of the funding was not revealed.

On 28 July 2023, the Civil Aviation Authority granted HyImpulse permission to launch its SR75 suborbital sounding rocket for the first time from SaxaVord between 1 December 2023 and 30 November 2024. HyImpulse subsequently moved the maiden flight of the SR75 to Koonibba Test Range in South Australia, citing delays to infrastructure at SaxaVord. The Civil Aviation Authority announced on 17 December 2023 that SaxaVord had nevertheless been granted a spaceport licence "to host up to 30 launches a year", making it "the first fully licensed vertical spaceport in Western Europe."

In April 2024, the spaceport was granted a range licence by the Civil Aviation Authority, allowing them to control the sea and airspace to the north of the site around orbital launch trajectories. In May 2024 Rocket Factory Augsburg's orbit-capable RFA One conducted an engine hotfire test at the spaceport site.

On 19 August 2024, a static fire test of the RFA One first stage with all nine engines was conducted, on the stage that was slated to fly on the maiden flight of RFA One. The test experienced an anomaly that resulted in a fire, subsequent explosion, loss of the stage, and major damage to the launch mount.

In October 2024, UK rocket manufacturer Orbex announced their intention to mothball their proposed Sutherland spaceport on the Scottish mainland near Tongue and relocate planned launches to SaxaVord (citing its more advanced state of development). Orbex went insolvent and stopped operations in February 2026.

On 16 January 2025, the CAA granted a launch licence for the RFA One rocket to reach orbit, the first of its kind in the UK and Europe. This licence is limited to 10 launches per year as well as no more than two in any given month, and must give 60 days' notice for range safety purposes.

In August 2025, the Civil Aviation Authority licensed Skyrora to conduct up to 16 sub-orbital Skylark L launches per year from SaxaVord—the second launch operator to be licensed to use the site - following the spaceport’s vertical launch and range control licences granted in December 2023 and April 2024.

Rocket Factory Augsburg was granted a license to deposit debris from its launch activities by the Scottish Government on 16 July 2026, having initially applied in December 2023.

== In popular culture ==
The site is adjacent to the Saxa Vord distillery, which released spaceport-themed products in response.

== See also ==
- Esrange Space Center in northern Sweden
- Sutherland spaceport
- Space industry of Scotland
