= List of spaceflight launches in January–March 2025 =

This article lists orbital and suborbital launches during the first quarter of the year 2025.

For all other spaceflight activities, see 2025 in spaceflight. For launches during the rest of 2025, see List of spaceflight launches in April–June 2025, List of spaceflight launches in July–September 2025, and List of spaceflight launches in October–December 2025.

== Orbital launches ==
- ← Jan
- Feb
- Mar
- Apr
- May
- Jun
- Jul
- Aug
- Sep
- Oct
- Nov
- Dec →

=== January ===
Date and time (UTC)	Rocket	Flight number	Launch site		LSP	
Date and time (UTC)	Payload (⚀ = CubeSat)	Operator	Orbit	Function	Decay (UTC)	Outcome
Date and time (UTC)	Remarks					
4 January; 01:27	(United States) Falcon 9 Block 5	F9-418	(United States) Cape Canaveral SLC-40		(United States) SpaceX	
4 January; 01:27	(United Arab Emirates) Thuraya 4-NGS	Thuraya	GTO to Geosynchronous	Communications	In orbit	Operational
4 January; 01:27	Planned replacement for Thuraya 2 and 3. Booster: B1073.20					
6 January; 20:00	(China) Long March 3B/E	3B-Y104	(China) Xichang LC-3		(China) CASC	
6 January; 20:00	(China) Shijian-25	SAST	GTO to Geosynchronous	Satellite servicing Technology demonstration	In orbit	Operational
6 January; 20:00	Docked with Shijian-21 for refueling purposes between July and November 2025.					
6 January; 20:43:59	(United States) Falcon 9 Block 5	Starlink Group 6-71	(United States) Cape Canaveral SLC-40		(United States) SpaceX	
6 January; 20:43:59	(United States) Starlink × 24	SpaceX	Low Earth	Communications	In orbit	Operational
6 January; 20:43:59	Booster: B1077.17					
8 January; 15:27:00	(United States) Falcon 9 Block 5	Starlink Group 12-11	(United States) Kennedy LC-39A		(United States) SpaceX	
8 January; 15:27:00	(United States) Starlink × 8	SpaceX	Low Earth	Communications	In orbit	Operational
8 January; 15:27:00	(United States) Starlink-D2C × 13	SpaceX	Low Earth	Communications	In orbit	Operational
8 January; 15:27:00	Booster: B1086.3					
10 January; 03:53	(United States) Falcon 9 Block 5	F9-421	(United States) Vandenberg SLC-4E		(United States) SpaceX	
10 January; 03:53	(United States) USA-463 - USA-484 (Starshield Group 1-6)	NRO	Low Earth (SSO)	Reconnaissance	In orbit	Operational
10 January; 03:53	NROL-153 Mission (NRO Proliferated Architecture Mission). Seventh batch consisting of SpaceX/Northrop built 22 Starshield satellites for the National Reconnaissance Office. Booster: B1071.22					
10 January; 19:11:20	(United States) Falcon 9 Block 5	Starlink Group 12-12	(United States) Cape Canaveral SLC-40		(United States) SpaceX	
10 January; 19:11:20	(United States) Starlink × 8	SpaceX	Low Earth	Communications	In orbit	Operational
10 January; 19:11:20	(United States) Starlink-D2C × 13	SpaceX	Low Earth	Communications	In orbit	Operational
10 January; 19:11:20	B1067 has become the first booster to launch for its 25th time. Booster: B1067.25					
13 January; 03:00	(China) Jielong 3	Y5	(China) Dong Fang Hang Tian Gang platform, Yellow Sea		China Rocket	
13 January; 03:00	(China) CentiSpace-1 S7-16 (Weili Kongjian 7-16)	Beijing Future Navigation Technology	Low Earth	Navigation	In orbit	Operational
13 January; 03:00	CentiSpace Group 01 Mission.					
13 January; 16:47:09	(United States) Falcon 9 Block 5	Starlink Group 12-4	(United States) Cape Canaveral SLC-40		(United States) SpaceX	
13 January; 16:47:09	(United States) Starlink × 8	SpaceX	Low Earth	Communications	In orbit	Operational
13 January; 16:47:09	(United States) Starlink-D2C × 13	SpaceX	Low Earth	Communications	In orbit	Operational
13 January; 16:47:09	Booster: B1080.15					
14 January; 21:25:30	(United States) Falcon 9 Block 5	Transporter-12	(United States) Vandenberg SLC-4E		(United States) SpaceX	
14 January; 21:25:30	(Turkey) FGN-100-D1	Fergani Space	Low Earth (SSO)	Technology demonstration	In orbit	Operational
14 January; 21:25:30	(India) Firefly × 3	Pixxel	Low Earth (SSO)	Earth observation	In orbit	Operational
14 January; 21:25:30	(Spain) GARAI A	Satlantis	Low Earth (SSO)	Earth observation	In orbit	Operational
14 January; 21:25:30	(Finland) ICEYE × 4	ICEYE	Low Earth (SSO)	Earth observation	In orbit	Operational
14 January; 21:25:30	(United States) Impulse 2 (LEO Express-2)	Impulse Space	Low Earth (SSO)	Space tug	In orbit	Operational
14 January; 21:25:30	(Italy) ION SCV-014 Amazing Antonius	D-Orbit	Low Earth (SSO)	Space tug	In orbit	Operational
14 January; 21:25:30	(Italy) ION SCV-016 Eminent Emmanuel	D-Orbit	Low Earth (SSO)	Space tug	In orbit	Operational
14 January; 21:25:30	(Italy) IRIDE-MS2-HEO 1	ASI / Argotec	Low Earth (SSO)	Earth observation	In orbit	Operational
14 January; 21:25:30	(Canada) JAY-C, D1, D2 (Gray Jay 1, 2, 3)	DRDC	Low Earth (SSO)	Arctic surveillance	In orbit	Operational
14 January; 21:25:30	(United States) Lyra Block-1 1	EchoStar	Low Earth (SSO)	IoT	In orbit	Operational
14 January; 21:25:30	(United Arab Emirates) MBZ-SAT	MBRSC	Low Earth (SSO)	Earth observation	In orbit	Operational
14 January; 21:25:30	(Norway) NORSAT 4	NOSA	Low Earth (SSO)	AIS ship tracking	In orbit	Operational
14 January; 21:25:30	(United States) Pelican-2	Planet Labs	Low Earth (SSO)	Earth observation	In orbit	Operational
14 January; 21:25:30	(United States) Ray 1.0	Inversion Space	Low Earth (SSO)	Reentry capsule	In orbit	Spacecraft failure
14 January; 21:25:30	(Germany) SIGI	Media Broadcast Satellite / Reflex Aerospace	Low Earth (SSO)	Technology demonstration	In orbit	Operational
14 January; 21:25:30	(Germany) SkyBee-1	Constellr	Low Earth (SSO)	Earth observation	In orbit	Operational
14 January; 21:25:30	(Malaysia) (Argentina) UzmaSAT-1 (ÑuSat-45)	Satellogic / Uzma	Low Earth (SSO)	Earth observation	In orbit	Operational
14 January; 21:25:30	(United States) W-2 (Winnebago-2)	Varda Space Industries	Low Earth (SSO)	Reentry capsule	27 February 2025; 13:52	Successful
14 January; 21:25:30	⚀ (Japan) AE1C, D	ArkEdge Space	Low Earth (SSO)	Technology demonstration	In orbit	Operational
14 January; 21:25:30	⚀ (United Arab Emirates) Al Ain Sat-1	NSSTC - UAEU	Low Earth (SSO)	Educational / Earth observation	In orbit	Operational
14 January; 21:25:30	⚀ (Spain) ANSER Leader-S	INTA	Low Earth (SSO)	Earth observation	In orbit	Operational
14 January; 21:25:30	⚀ (Bulgaria) Balkan 1	EnduroSat	Low Earth (SSO)	Earth observation	In orbit	Operational
14 January; 21:25:30	⚀ (South Korea) BlueBon	TelePIX	Low Earth (SSO)	Earth observation	In orbit	Operational
14 January; 21:25:30	⚀ (France) BRO-16	UnseenLabs	Low Earth (SSO)	SIGINT	In orbit	Operational
14 January; 21:25:30	⚀ (France) BUZZER-1	UnseenLabs	Low Earth (SSO)	SIGINT	In orbit	Operational
14 January; 21:25:30	⚀ (Australia) Centauri 7	Fleet Space	Low Earth (SSO)	IoT	In orbit	Operational
14 January; 21:25:30	⚀ (Australia) Centauri 8	Fleet Space	Low Earth (SSO)	IoT	In orbit	Operational
14 January; 21:25:30	⚀ (Turkey) Connecta IoT × 4	Plan-S	Low Earth (SSO)	IoT	In orbit	Operational
14 January; 21:25:30	⚀ (Denmark) Edison-1	Space Inventor	Low Earth (SSO)	Technology demonstration	In orbit	Operational
14 January; 21:25:30	⚀ (India) Elevation-1	XDLINX Space Labs	Low Earth (SSO)	Communications	In orbit	Operational
14 January; 21:25:30	⚀ (United States) Flock-4g × 36	Planet Labs	Low Earth (SSO)	Earth observation	In orbit	Operational
14 January; 21:25:30	⚀ (Germany) FOREST-3	Orora Technologies	Low Earth (SSO)	Earth observation	In orbit	Operational
14 January; 21:25:30	⚀ (Japan) FUSION-1	University of Fukui / Seiren / Fukui TV / Fukui University of Technology	Low Earth (SSO)	Earth observation	In orbit	Operational
14 January; 21:25:30	⚀ (France) GESat GEN1	Absolut Sensing	Low Earth (SSO)	Earth observation of atmospheric methane	In orbit	Operational
14 January; 21:25:30	⚀ (United Arab Emirates) HCT-Sat 1	HCT	Low Earth (SSO)	Educational	In orbit	Operational
14 January; 21:25:30	⚀ (Germany) InnoCubE	TU Berlin / University of Würzburg	Low Earth (SSO)	Technology demonstration	In orbit	Operational
14 January; 21:25:30	⚀ (Taiwan) IRIS-F2	SATORO Space	Low Earth (SSO)	AIS ship tracking	In orbit	Operational
14 January; 21:25:30	⚀ (Taiwan) IRIS-F3	SATORO Space	Low Earth (SSO)	AIS ship tracking	In orbit	Operational
14 January; 21:25:30	⚀ (United States) Lemur-2 × 6	Spire Global	Low Earth (SSO)	IoT	In orbit	Operational
14 January; 21:25:30	⚀ (United States) LIME	NOVI Space	Low Earth (SSO)	Technology demonstration	In orbit	Operational
14 January; 21:25:30	⚀ (Thailand) LOGSATS-2	EOS Orbit	Low Earth (SSO)	IoT	In orbit	Operational
14 January; 21:25:30	⚀ (United States) Otter	NPS	Low Earth (SSO)	Technology demonstration / Communications	In orbit	Operational
14 January; 21:25:30	⚀ (Taiwan) PARUS-T1	TASA / NFU	Low Earth (SSO)	Amateur radio	In orbit	Operational
14 January; 21:25:30	⚀ (Pakistan) PAUSAT-1	AU	Low Earth (SSO)	Earth observation	In orbit	Operational
14 January; 21:25:30	⚀ (Portugal) PoSAT-2	LusoSpace	Low Earth (SSO)	Communications	In orbit	Operational
14 January; 21:25:30	⚀ (United States) SatGus	CrunchLabs	Low Earth (SSO)	Space selfie	In orbit	Operational
14 January; 21:25:30	⚀ (Czech Republic) SATurnin-1	VZLU Aerospace	Low Earth (SSO)	Earth observation	In orbit	Operational
14 January; 21:25:30	⚀ (India) (United Kingdom) SCOT	Digantara / Orb Astro	Low Earth (SSO)	Space surveillance	In orbit	Operational
14 January; 21:25:30	⚀ (United States) Sedna 2	AAC Clyde Space	Low Earth (SSO)	Technology demonstration	In orbit	Operational
14 January; 21:25:30	⚀ (United States) TechEdSat-22 (TES-22)	NASA	Low Earth (SSO)	Technology demonstration	In orbit	Deployment failure
14 January; 21:25:30	⚀ (Czech Republic) TROLL	TRL Space	Low Earth (SSO)	Technology demonstration	In orbit	Operational
14 January; 21:25:30	⚀ (United States) Veery-0F Fledgling Veery Barb	Care Weather	Low Earth (SSO)	Meteorology	In orbit	Operational
14 January; 21:25:30	▫ (Spain) FOSSASat TAT-A, E, O	FOSSA Systems	Low Earth (SSO)	IoT	In orbit	Operational
14 January; 21:25:30	▫ (Spain) HADES-R (SmartSat)	AMSAT-EA	Low Earth (SSO)	Technology demonstration / Amateur radio	In orbit	Operational
14 January; 21:25:30	▫ (Spain) HYDRA-T	Hydra Space / AMSAT-EA	Low Earth (SSO)	IoT	In orbit	Operational
14 January; 21:25:30	▫ (Poland) HYPE	AGH University	Low Earth (SSO)	Space selfie / Amateur radio	In orbit	Operational
14 January; 21:25:30	▫ (Luxembourg) POQUITO	University of Luxembourg	Low Earth (SSO)	Technology demonstration	In orbit	Operational
14 January; 21:25:30	▫ (Portugal) (United States) PROMETHEUS-1	University of Minho / CMU	Low Earth (SSO)	Educational	In orbit	Operational
14 January; 21:25:30	▫ (Turkey) SKYLINK-1	Hello Space	Low Earth (SSO)	IoT	In orbit	Operational
14 January; 21:25:30	▫ (Turkey) SKYLINK-2	Hello Space	Low Earth (SSO)	IoT	In orbit	Operational
14 January; 21:25:30	Dedicated SmallSat Rideshare mission to sun-synchronous orbit, designated Transporter-12. The ELaNa-54a mission, consisting of the TechEdSat-22 cubesat, was launched on this flight. Booster: B1088.2					
15 January; 06:11:39	(United States) Falcon 9 Block 5	F9-425	(United States) Kennedy LC-39A		(United States) SpaceX	
15 January; 06:11:39	(United States) Blue Ghost M1	NASA / Firefly	TLI to Selenocentric to lunar surface	Lunar lander	2 March 2025; 08:34	Successful
15 January; 06:11:39	(Japan) Hakuto-R M2 RESILIENCE	ispace	TLI to Selenocentric to lunar surface	Lunar lander	5 June 2025	Crashed on lunar surface
15 January; 06:11:39	(Luxembourg) Tenacious	ispace Europe	Lunar surface	Lunar rover	5 June 2025	Crashed on lunar surface
15 January; 06:11:39	First flight of Firefly's Blue Ghost lunar lander. Commercial Lunar Payload Services (CLPS) mission delivering ten payloads to Mare Crisium. Hakuto-R Mission 2, carrying ispace's RESILIENCE lander and Tenacious micro rover. 100th Falcon 9 launch from the Historic Kennedy Space Center Launch Complex 39A (LC-39A). Blue Ghost Mission 1 successfully landed at Mare Crisium on March 2, 2025. Booster: B1085.5					
16 January; 07:03	(United States) New Glenn	NG-1	(United States) Cape Canaveral LC-36A		(United States) Blue Origin	
16 January; 07:03	(United States) Blue Ring Pathfinder (DarkSky-1)	Blue Origin	Medium Earth	Technology demonstration	16 January	Successful
16 January; 07:03	Maiden flight of Blue Origin's New Glenn rocket, carrying a prototype Blue Ring satellite servicing platform. First National Security Space Launch demonstration flight for New Glenn. First orbital launch attempt and success for Blue Origin. Booster reentry and landing on recovery vessel Jacklyn was attempted, however, a loss of telemetry data to the booster occurred shortly after the beginning of the entry burn, and the first stage was later confirmed lost by Blue Origin.					
17 January; 04:07	(China) Long March 2D	2D-Y101	(China) Jiuquan SLS-2		(China) CASC	
17 January; 04:07	(Pakistan) PRSC-EO1 (Kaukab EO-1)	SUPARCO	Low Earth (SSO)	Earth observation	In orbit	Operational
17 January; 04:07	(China) Tianlu-1 (Daqi Tance Yaogan)	GalaxySpace	Low Earth (SSO)	Aeronomy	In orbit	Operational
17 January; 04:07	⚀ (China) Lantan-1 (Hangdian Zhisuan-1)	Geespace	Low Earth (SSO)	Oceanography	In orbit	Operational
17 January; 04:07	First Stage is fitted with grid fins to control impact area. The Long March 2D rocket adopted the "dual satellites in series + supporting cabin side wall carrying" launch configuration for the first time.					
20 January; 10:11	(China) Ceres-1	Y16	(China) Jiuquan LS-95A		(China) Galactic Energy	
20 January; 10:11	(China) Yunyao-1 37 (Wei Huiyuan)	CGSTL	Low Earth (SSO)	Meteorology	In orbit	Operational
20 January; 10:11	(China) Yunyao-1 38 (Jinding Shiyan)	CGSTL	Low Earth (SSO)	Meteorology	In orbit	Operational
20 January; 10:11	(China) Yunyao-1 39 (Huaqing Haifeng)	CGSTL	Low Earth (SSO)	Meteorology	In orbit	Operational
20 January; 10:11	(China) Yunyao-1 40	CGSTL	Low Earth (SSO)	Meteorology	In orbit	Operational
20 January; 10:11	(China) Jitianxing A-05 (Nanjing Xuanwu)	Jitian Xingzhou Space Technology	Low Earth (SSO)	Earth observation	In orbit	Operational
20 January; 10:11	Mission designated "On Your Shoulders".					
21 January; 05:24:50	(United States) Falcon 9 Block 5	Starlink Group 13-1	(United States) Kennedy LC-39A		(United States) SpaceX	
21 January; 05:24:50	(United States) Starlink × 21	SpaceX	Low Earth	Communications	In orbit	Operational
21 January; 05:24:50	(United States) USA-485 - USA-486 (Starshield Group 2-3)	TBA	Low Earth	TBA	In orbit	Operational
21 January; 05:24:50	First launch of Starlink Group 13 Satellites. Booster: B1083.8					
21 January; 15:45:50	(United States) Falcon 9 Block 5	Starlink Group 11-8	(United States) Vandenberg SLC-4E		(United States) SpaceX	
21 January; 15:45:50	(United States) Starlink × 27	SpaceX	Low Earth	Communications	In orbit	Operational
21 January; 15:45:50	First launch of Upgrade Starlink v2 Mini Satellites. Booster: B1082.10					
23 January; 05:15	(China) Long March 6A	6A-Y6 / G60 Polar Group 06	(China) Taiyuan LA-9A		(China) CASC	
23 January; 05:15	(China) Qianfan × 18	SSST	Low Earth (Polar)	Communications	In orbit	Operational
23 January; 05:15	Fourth batch of satellites for the 14,000-satellite Thousand Sails megaconstellation.					
23 January; 15:32	(China) Long March 3B/E	3B-Y105	(China) Xichang LC-2		(China) CASC	
23 January; 15:32	(China) TJS-14	SAST	GTO to Geosynchronous	Technology demonstration Communications	In orbit	Operational
24 January; 14:07:00	(United States) Falcon 9 Block 5	Starlink Group 11-6	(United States) Vandenberg SLC-4E		(United States) SpaceX	
24 January; 14:07:00	(United States) Starlink × 23	SpaceX	Low Earth	Communications	In orbit	Operational
24 January; 14:07:00	Booster: B1063.23					
27 January; 22:05:00	(United States) Falcon 9 Block 5	Starlink Group 12-7	(United States) Cape Canaveral SLC-40		(United States) SpaceX	
27 January; 22:05:00	(United States) Starlink × 8	SpaceX	Low Earth	Communications	In orbit	Operational
27 January; 22:05:00	(United States) Starlink-D2C × 13	SpaceX	Low Earth	Communications	In orbit	Operational
27 January; 22:05:00	Booster: B1076.20					
29 January; 00:53	(India) GSLV Mk II	F15	(India) Satish Dhawan SLP		(India) ISRO	
29 January; 00:53	(India) NVS-02 (IRNSS-1K)	ISRO	GTO	Navigation	In orbit	Operational
29 January; 00:53	NVS-02 replaced IRNSS-1E. Next generation NAVIC satellite. Due to an issue with the oxidizer valves in the propulsion system is preventing the satellite from performing its orbit raise maneuvers.					
30 January; 01:34	(United States) Falcon 9 Block 5	F9-430	(United States) Kennedy LC-39A		(United States) SpaceX	
30 January; 01:34	(Spain) SpainSat NG I	Hisdesat	GTO to Geosynchronous	Communications	In orbit	Operational
30 January; 01:34	SpainSat NG I replaced XTAR-EUR. Falcon 9 First Stage Booster (B1073) was expended in this mission. Booster: B1073.21					

- ← Jan
- Feb
- Mar
- Apr
- May
- Jun
- Jul
- Aug
- Sep
- Oct
- Nov
- Dec →

=== February ===
Date and time (UTC)	Rocket	Flight number	Launch site		LSP	
Date and time (UTC)	Payload (⚀ = CubeSat)	Operator	Orbit	Function	Decay (UTC)	Outcome
Date and time (UTC)	Remarks					
1 February; 23:02:10	(United States) Falcon 9 Block 5	Starlink Group 11-4	(United States) Vandenberg SLC-4E		(United States) SpaceX	
1 February; 23:02:10	(United States) Starlink × 22	SpaceX	Low Earth	Communications	In orbit	Operational
2 February; 08:30:00	(Japan) H3-22S	F5	(Japan) Tanegashima LA-Y2		(Japan) JAXA	
2 February; 08:30:00	(Japan) QZS-6 (Michibiki-6)	CAO	GTO to Geosynchronous	Navigation	In orbit	Operational
2 February; 08:30:00	QZS-6 carries a USSF SĀCHI Space Situational Awareness payload.					
4 February; 10:15:00	(United States) Falcon 9 Block 5	Starlink Group 12-3	(United States) Cape Canaveral SLC-40		(United States) SpaceX	
4 February; 10:15:00	(United States) Starlink × 8	SpaceX	Low Earth	Communications	In orbit	Operational
4 February; 10:15:00	(United States) Starlink-D2C × 13	SpaceX	Low Earth	Communications	In orbit	Operational
4 February; 23:13:00	(United States) Falcon 9 Block 5	F9-433	(United States) Kennedy LC-39A		(United States) SpaceX	
4 February; 23:13:00	(United States) WorldView Legion 5	Maxar Technologies	Low Earth	Earth observation	In orbit	Operational
4 February; 23:13:00	(United States) WorldView Legion 6	Maxar Technologies	Low Earth	Earth observation	In orbit	Operational
5 February; 03:59:24	(Russia) Soyuz-2.1v / Volga		(Russia) Plesetsk Site 43/4		(Russia) RVSN RF	
5 February; 03:59:24	(Russia) Kosmos 2581 (MKA B1)	VKS	Low Earth (Polar)	TBA	In orbit	Operational
5 February; 03:59:24	(Russia) Kosmos 2582 (MKA B2)	VKS	Low Earth (Polar)	TBA	In orbit	Operational
5 February; 03:59:24	(Russia) Kosmos 2583 (MKA B3)	VKS	Low Earth (Polar)	TBA	In orbit	Operational
5 February; 03:59:24	Final Launch of Soyuz-2.1v / Volga Combination, and Soyuz-2.1v as a whole.					
8 February; 19:18:30	(United States) Falcon 9 Block 5	Starlink Group 12-9	(United States) Cape Canaveral SLC-40		(United States) SpaceX	
8 February; 19:18:30	(United States) Starlink × 8	SpaceX	Low Earth	Communications	In orbit	Operational
8 February; 19:18:30	(United States) Starlink-D2C × 13	SpaceX	Low Earth	Communications	In orbit	Operational
8 February; 20:43	(United States) Electron	"IoT 4 You And Me"	(New Zealand) Mahia LC-1A		(United States) Rocket Lab	
8 February; 20:43	⚀ (France) Kinéis × 5	Kinéis	Low Earth	IoT	In orbit	Operational
8 February; 20:43	Fourth of five dedicated launches for Kinéis' IoT satellite constellation.					
11 February; 02:09:40	(United States) Falcon 9 Block 5	Starlink Group 11-10	(United States) Vandenberg SLC-4E		(United States) SpaceX	
11 February; 02:09:40	(United States) Starlink × 23	SpaceX	Low Earth	Communications	In orbit	Operational
11 February; 09:30	(China) Long March 8A	8A-Y1 / SatNet LEO Group 02	(China) Wenchang LC-2		(China) CASC	
11 February; 09:30	(China) Guowang × 9	CASIC	Low Earth (SSO)	Communications	In orbit	Operational
11 February; 09:30	Maiden flight of the Long March 8A variant. Second batch of satellites for the 13,000-satellite Guowang (Xingwang) megaconstellation.					
11 February; 18:53:10	(United States) Falcon 9 Block 5	Starlink Group 12-18	(United States) Cape Canaveral SLC-40		(United States) SpaceX	
11 February; 18:53:10	(United States) Starlink × 8	SpaceX	Low Earth	Communications	In orbit	Operational
11 February; 18:53:10	(United States) Starlink-D2C × 13	SpaceX	Low Earth	Communications	In orbit	Operational
15 February; 06:14:10	(United States) Falcon 9 Block 5	Starlink Group 12-8	(United States) Cape Canaveral SLC-40		(United States) SpaceX	
15 February; 06:14:10	(United States) Starlink × 8	SpaceX	Low Earth	Communications	In orbit	Operational
15 February; 06:14:10	(United States) Starlink-D2C × 13	SpaceX	Low Earth	Communications	In orbit	Operational
15 February; 06:14:10	B1067 has become the first booster to launch for its 26th time.					
18 February; 23:17	(United States) Electron	"Fasten Your Space Belts"	(New Zealand) Mahia LC-1B		(United States) Rocket Lab	
18 February; 23:17	(United States) BlackSky Global 31 (BlackSky 20)	BlackSky Global	Low Earth (SSO)	Earth observation	In orbit	Operational
18 February; 23:17	First of five dedicated launches for BlackSky's 3rd generation satellites.					
18 February; 23:21:50	(United States) Falcon 9 Block 5	Starlink Group 10-12	(United States) Cape Canaveral SLC-40		(United States) SpaceX	
18 February; 23:21:50	(United States) Starlink × 23	SpaceX	Low Earth	Communications	In orbit	Operational
18 February; 23:21:50	B1080 has become first booster to land within The Bahamas.					
18 February	(Iran) Simorgh / Saman-1		(Iran) Semnan LP-2		(Iran) ISA	
18 February	(Iran) Navak-1	ISA	GEO	Technology demonstration	18 February	Launch failure
18 February	First Iranian attempt to reach geostationary orbit.					
21 February; 15:19:00	(United States) Falcon 9 Block 5	Starlink Group 12-14	(United States) Cape Canaveral SLC-40		(United States) SpaceX	
21 February; 15:19:00	(United States) Starlink × 10	SpaceX	Low Earth	Communications	In orbit	Operational
21 February; 15:19:00	(United States) Starlink-D2C × 13	SpaceX	Low Earth	Communications	In orbit	Operational
22 February; 12:11	(China) Long March 3B/E	3B-Y101	(China) Xichang LC-2		(China) CASC	
22 February; 12:11	(China) ChinaSat 10R	China Satcom	GTO to Geosynchronous	Communications	In orbit	Operational
22 February; 12:11	ChinaSat 10R replaced ChinaSat 10.					
23 February; 01:38:20	(United States) Falcon 9 Block 5	Starlink Group 15-1	(United States) Vandenberg SLC-4E		(United States) SpaceX	
23 February; 01:38:20	(United States) Starlink × 22	SpaceX	Low Earth	Communications	In orbit	Operational
23 February; 01:38:20	First launch of Starlink Group 15 Satellites.					
27 February; 00:16:30	(United States) Falcon 9 Block 5	F9-441	(United States) Kennedy LC-39A		(United States) SpaceX	
27 February; 00:16:30	(United States) Nova-C Athena	Intuitive Machines	TLI to Selenocentric to lunar surface	Lunar lander	6 March	Partial failure
27 February; 00:16:30	(United States) Brokkr-2 Odin	AstroForge	TLI to Heliocentric	Technology demonstration	6 March	Spacecraft failure
27 February; 00:16:30	(Argentina) (United States) Chimera GEO-1	Epic Aerospace	TLI to Geosynchronous	Space tug	6 March	Unknown
27 February; 00:16:30	(United States) Lunar Trailblazer	NASA / Caltech	TLI to Selenocentric	Lunar orbiter	6 March	Spacecraft failure
27 February; 00:16:30	⚀ 1 Undisclosed cubesat	TBA	Geosynchronous	TBA	6 March	Unknown
27 February; 00:16:30	(United States) AstroAnt	MIT	Lunar surface	Lunar rover	6 March	Precluded
27 February; 00:16:30	(United States) (Finland) MAPP LV1	Lunar Outpost / Nokia	Lunar surface	Lunar rover / Technology demonstration	6 March	Precluded
27 February; 00:16:30	(United States) Micro Nova Gracie	Intuitive Machines	Lunar surface	Lunar hopper	6 March	Precluded
27 February; 00:16:30	(Japan) Yaoki	Dymon	Lunar surface	Lunar rover	6 March	Precluded
27 February; 00:16:30	IM-2 South Pole Mission, flying the second Nova-C lunar lander. The Polar Resources Ice Mining Experiment 1 (PRIME-1) payload will be delivered to the lunar south pole near Shackleton Crater for the CLPS program. Odin was to travel to near Earth asteroid 2022 OB_{5}. 100th landing of Falcon 9 First Stage Booster on A Shortfall of Gravitas Droneship.					
27 February; 03:34:20	(United States) Falcon 9 Block 5	Starlink Group 12-13	(United States) Cape Canaveral SLC-40		(United States) SpaceX	
27 February; 03:34:20	(United States) Starlink × 8	SpaceX	Low Earth	Communications	In orbit	Operational
27 February; 03:34:20	(United States) Starlink-D2C × 13	SpaceX	Low Earth	Communications	In orbit	Operational
27 February; 07:08	(China) Long March 2C	2C-Y81	(China) Jiuquan SLS-2		(China) CASC	
27 February; 07:08	(China) Siwei Gaojing 1-03 (SuperView Neo 1-03)	China Siwei	Low Earth (SSO)	Earth Observation	In orbit	Operational
27 February; 07:08	(China) Siwei Gaojing 1-04 (SuperView Neo 1-04)	China Siwei	Low Earth (SSO)	Earth Observation	In orbit	Operational
27 February; 21:24:27	(Russia) Soyuz-2.1a		(Kazakhstan) Baikonur Site 31/6		(Russia) Roscosmos	
27 February; 21:24:27	(Russia) Progress MS-30 / 91P	Roscosmos	Low Earth (ISS)	ISS logistics	9 September 2025; 19:59	Successful
27 February; 21:24:27	The Progress MS-30 fairing featured an insignia dedicated to the 100th birthday of Pavel Belyaev, the commander of the Voskhod 2 mission which achieved the world's first spacewalk in 1965 and had its 60th anniversary in March 2025, commemorated with another logo on the opposite side of the same fairing.					

- ← Jan
- Feb
- Mar
- Apr
- May
- Jun
- Jul
- Aug
- Sep
- Oct
- Nov
- Dec →

=== March ===
Date and time (UTC)	Rocket	Flight number	Launch site		LSP	
Date and time (UTC)	Payload (⚀ = CubeSat)	Operator	Orbit	Function	Decay (UTC)	Outcome
Date and time (UTC)	Remarks					
1 March; 10:00	(China) Kuaizhou 1A	Y33	(China) Jiuquan LS-95A		(China) ExPace	
1 March; 10:00	(China) TBA	TBA	Low Earth (SSO)	TBA	1 March	Launch failure
2 March; 22:22:16	(Russia) Soyuz-2.1b / Fregat-M		(Russia) Plesetsk Site 43/3		(Russia) RVSN RF	
2 March; 22:22:16	(Russia) Kosmos 2584 (GLONASS-K2 14L (K2 №2))	VKS	Medium Earth	Navigation	In orbit	Operational
3 March; 02:24:00	(United States) Falcon 9 Block 5	Starlink Group 12-20	(United States) Cape Canaveral SLC-40		(United States) SpaceX	
3 March; 02:24:00	(United States) Starlink × 8	SpaceX	Low Earth	Communications	In orbit	Operational
3 March; 02:24:00	(United States) Starlink-D2C × 13	SpaceX	Low Earth	Communications	In orbit	Operational
3 March; 02:24:00	Falcon 9 First Stage Booster (B1086) landed successfully on Just Read the Instructions droneship, but written off after tipping over due to an off-nominal fire in the aft end of the rocket damaged a landing leg.					
6 March; 16:24	(France) Ariane 62	VA263	(France) Kourou ELA-4		(France) Arianespace	
6 March; 16:24	(France) CSO-3	CNES / DGA	Low Earth (SSO)	Reconnaissance	In orbit	Operational
6 March; 16:24	First Operational and Commercial flight of Ariane 6.					
9 March; 17:17	(China) Long March 3B/E	3B-Y102	(China) Xichang LC-3		(China) CASC	
9 March; 17:17	(China) TJS-15	SAST	GTO to Geosynchronous	Technology demonstration Communications	In orbit	Operational
9 March; 17:17	(China) 1 Undisclosed satellite	TBA	GTO to Geosynchronous	TBA		
9 March; 17:17	100th successful launch of Long March 3B. Overall there have been 105 Long March 3B launches, including 2 failures and 2 partial failures.					
11 March; 16:38	(China) Long March 8	Y6 / G60 Polar Group 05	(China) Wenchang Hainan LC-1		(China) CASC	
11 March; 16:38	(China) Qianfan × 18	SSST	Low Earth (SSO)	Communications	In orbit	Operational
11 March; 16:38	First launch from the Wenchang Commercial Space Launch Site's LC-1.					
12 March; 03:10:12	(United States) Falcon 9 Block 5	F9-444	(United States) Vandenberg SLC-4E		(United States) SpaceX	
12 March; 03:10:12	(United States) SPHEREx (MIDEX-9/Explorer-102)	NASA JPL	Low Earth (SSO)	Near-infrared astronomy	In orbit	Operational
12 March; 03:10:12	(United States) PUNCH-NFI (SMEX-15A/Explorer-98)	NASA	Low Earth (SSO)	Heliophysics	In orbit	Operational
12 March; 03:10:12	(United States) PUNCH-WFI 1 (SMEX-15B/Explorer-99)	NASA	Low Earth (SSO)	Heliophysics	In orbit	Operational
12 March; 03:10:12	(United States) PUNCH-WFI 2 (SMEX-15C/Explorer-101)	NASA	Low Earth (SSO)	Heliophysics	In orbit	Operational
12 March; 03:10:12	(United States) PUNCH-WFI 3 (SMEX-15D/Explorer-100)	NASA	Low Earth (SSO)	Heliophysics	In orbit	Operational
13 March; 02:35	(United States) Falcon 9 Block 5	Starlink Group 12-21	(United States) Cape Canaveral SLC-40		(United States) SpaceX	
13 March; 02:35	(United States) Starlink × 8	SpaceX	Low Earth	Communications	In orbit	Operational
13 March; 02:35	(United States) Starlink-D2C × 13	SpaceX	Low Earth	Communications	In orbit	Operational
14 March; 23:03:48	(United States) Falcon 9 Block 5	F9-446	(United States) Kennedy LC-39A		(United States) SpaceX	
14 March; 23:03:48	(United States) SpaceX Crew-10	SpaceX / NASA	Low Earth (ISS)	Expedition 72 / 73	In orbit	Docked to ISS
14 March; 23:03:48	Tenth operational Crew Dragon mission to the ISS.					
15 March; 00:00	(United States) Electron	"The Lightning God Reigns"	(New Zealand) Mahia LC-1B		(United States) Rocket Lab	
15 March; 00:00	(Japan) QPS-SAR 9 (SUSANOO-I)	iQPS	Low Earth	Earth observation	In orbit	Operational
15 March; 00:00	First of eight dedicated launches to support the build out of iQPS’ planned constellation of 36 synthetic aperture radar (SAR) satellites.					
15 March; 04:11	(China) Long March 2D	2D-Y100	(China) Jiuquan SLS-2		(China) CASC	
15 March; 04:11	(China) Siwei Gaojing 3-02 (SuperView Neo 3-02)	China Siwei	Low Earth (SSO)	Earth observation	In orbit	Operational
15 March; 04:11	(China) Tianyan-23	MinoSpace	Low Earth (SSO)	Earth observation	In orbit	Operational
15 March; 06:43	(United States) Falcon 9 Block 5	Transporter-13	(United States) Vandenberg SLC-4E		(United States) SpaceX	
15 March; 06:43	(Norway) Arvaker-1 (N3X-1)	Kongsberg	Low Earth (SSO)	Maritime surveillance	In orbit	Operational
15 March; 06:43	(United States) Clarity-1	Albedo Space	VLEO	Earth observation	In orbit	Operational
15 March; 06:43	(United States) DROID.002	Turion Space	Low Earth (SSO)	Space surveillance	In orbit	Operational
15 March; 06:43	(United Arab Emirates) (South Korea) DSAR-TD (Etihad-SAT)	MBRSC / Satrec Initiative	Low Earth (SSO)	Earth observation	In orbit	Operational
15 March; 06:43	(United States) FireSat 0 (MuSat-4)	Muon Space	Low Earth (SSO)	Earth observation / Technology demonstration	In orbit	Operational
15 March; 06:43	(Finland) ICEYE X46, X48, X50, X51	ICEYE	Low Earth (SSO)	Earth observation	In orbit	Operational
15 March; 06:43	(Italy) ION SCV-017 Marvelous Mathias	D-Orbit	Low Earth (SSO)	Space tug	In orbit	Operational
15 March; 06:43	(United States) LizzieSat-3	Sidus Space	Low Earth (SSO)	On-orbit Data Processing	In orbit	Operational
15 March; 06:43	(United States) M-SEL (Cortez)	Mitre Corporation / Astro Digital	Low Earth (SSO)	Technology demonstration	In orbit	Operational
15 March; 06:43	(South Korea) SpaceEye-T	Satrec Initiative	Low Earth (SSO)	Earth observation	In orbit	Operational
15 March; 06:43	(United States) Sphinx (Frazier)	Vestigo Aerospace	Low Earth (SSO)	Technology demonstration	In orbit	Operational
15 March; 06:43	(United States) W-3 (Winnebago-3)	Varda Space Industries	Low Earth (SSO)	Reentry capsule	14 May 2025; 02:07	Successful
15 March; 06:43	(United States) YAM 8	Loft Orbital	Low Earth (SSO)	Payload Hosting	In orbit	Operational
15 March; 06:43	⚀ (United States) Aerocube-18A	Aerospace Corporation	Low Earth (SSO)	Technology demonstration	In orbit	Operational
15 March; 06:43	⚀ (United States) Aerocube-18B	Aerospace Corporation	Low Earth (SSO)	Technology demonstration	In orbit	Operational
15 March; 06:43	⚀ (Bahrain) Al Munther	NSSA	Low Earth (SSO)	Earth observation	In orbit	Operational
15 March; 06:43	⚀ (Botswana) (Bulgaria) BOTSAT-1	BIUST / EnduroSat	Low Earth (SSO)	Earth observation	In orbit	Operational
15 March; 06:43	⚀ (Australia) Buccaneer Main Mission (BMM)	DST Group	Low Earth (SSO)	Technology demonstration	In orbit	Operational
15 March; 06:43	⚀ (United States) EZIE-A, B, C (Explorer-103, 104, 105)	NASA / JHUAPL	Low Earth (SSO)	Space weather / Electrojet research	In orbit	Operational
15 March; 06:43	⚀ (Italy) HERMES Pathfinder H1-6	HERMES-SP Consortium	Low Earth (SSO)	Gamma-ray; X-ray astronomy	In orbit	Operational
15 March; 06:43	⚀ (South Korea) HYVRID	Yonsei University	Low Earth (SSO)	Technology demonstration	In orbit	Operational
15 March; 06:43	⚀ (South Korea) JinjuSat-1B	Jinju City / Korea Testing Laboratory	Low Earth (SSO)	Earth observation	In orbit	Operational
15 March; 06:43	⚀ (United States) Lemur-2 × 7	Spire Global	Low Earth (SSO)	Earth observation / Technology demonstration / Reconnaissance	In orbit	Operational
15 March; 06:43	⚀ (India) NILA	HEX20	Low Earth (SSO)	Technology demonstration	In orbit	Operational
15 March; 06:43	⚀ (Singapore) NUSHSat-1	NUSH	Low Earth (SSO)	Educational	In orbit	Operational
15 March; 06:43	⚀ (United States) OrCa2b	Georgia Tech	Low Earth (SSO)	Calibration / Technology demonstration	In orbit	Operational
15 March; 06:43	⚀ (United States) OTP-2	Rogue Space Systems	Low Earth (SSO)	Technology demonstration	In orbit	Operational
15 March; 06:43	⚀ (France) PANDORE	U-Space	Low Earth (SSO)	Technology demonstration	In orbit	Operational
15 March; 06:43	⚀ (United States) RAPSat 1	NearSpace Launch	Low Earth (SSO)	Technology demonstration	In orbit	Operational
15 March; 06:43	⚀ (Poland) RED5 (Orb Astro-TR5)	Liftero	Low Earth (SSO)	Technology demonstration	In orbit	Operational
15 March; 06:43	⚀ (France) SOAP	U-Space	Low Earth (SSO)	Technology demonstration	In orbit	Operational
15 March; 06:43	⚀ (Spain) Startical IOD-1	Startical	Low Earth (SSO)	Technology demonstration	In orbit	Operational
15 March; 06:43	⚀ (Israel) Tevel 2 x 9	TAU / ISA	Low Earth (SSO)	Radiation Measurements in Space / Amateur radio	In orbit	Operational
15 March; 06:43	⚀ (United States) Tomorrow S5	Tomorrow.io	Low Earth (SSO)	Meteorology	In orbit	Operational
15 March; 06:43	⚀ (United States) Tomorrow S6	Tomorrow.io	Low Earth (SSO)	Meteorology	In orbit	Operational
15 March; 06:43	⚀ (France) UVSQ-Sat NG	UVSQ	Low Earth (SSO)	Earth's radiative balance studies	In orbit	Operational
15 March; 06:43	▫ (United States) HADES-ICM	Interstellar Communication Holdings	Low Earth (SSO)	Amateur radio	In orbit	Operational
15 March; 06:43	▫ (Spain) HYDRA-W	Hydra Space	Low Earth (SSO)	IoT	In orbit	Operational
15 March; 06:43	▫ (United Kingdom) Unicorn 2O, P, Q	Alba Orbital	Low Earth (SSO)	Earth observation	In orbit	Operational
15 March; 06:43	Dedicated SmallSat Rideshare mission to sun-synchronous orbit, designated Transporter-13. Heliophysics Mission of Opportunity for the Explorers Program.					
15 March; 11:35:10	(United States) Falcon 9 Block 5	Starlink Group 12-16	(United States) Cape Canaveral SLC-40		(United States) SpaceX	
15 March; 11:35:10	(United States) Starlink × 8	SpaceX	Low Earth	Communications	In orbit	Operational
15 March; 11:35:10	(United States) Starlink-D2C × 13	SpaceX	Low Earth	Communications	In orbit	Operational
16 March; 10:49:26	(Russia) Angara-1.2		(Russia) Plesetsk Site 35/1		(Russia) RVSN RF	
16 March; 10:49:26	(Russia) Kosmos 2585 (Strela-3M №19/Rodnik-S №19)	VKS	Low Earth	Military communications	In orbit	Operational
16 March; 10:49:26	(Russia) Kosmos 2586 (Strela-3M №20/Rodnik-S №20)	VKS	Low Earth	Military communications	In orbit	Operational
16 March; 10:49:26	(Russia) Kosmos 2587 (Strela-3M №21/Rodnik-S №21)	VKS	Low Earth	Military communications	In orbit	Operational
17 March; 08:07	(China) Ceres-1	Y10	(China) Jiuquan LS-95A		(China) Galactic Energy	
17 March; 08:07	(China) AIRSAT 06 (Zhongke 06/Laiwu Yaosheng 1)	CAS	Low Earth (SSO)	Earth observation	In orbit	Operational
17 March; 08:07	(China) AIRSAT 07 (Zhongke 07/Laiwu Yaosheng 2)	CAS	Low Earth (SSO)	Earth observation	In orbit	Operational
17 March; 08:07	(China) Yunyao-1 55-60	CGSTL	Low Earth (SSO)	Meteorology	In orbit	Operational
17 March; 08:07	Mission designated "Auld Lang Syne".					
18 March; 01:31	(United States) Electron	"High Five"	(New Zealand) Mahia LC-1A		(United States) Rocket Lab	
18 March; 01:31	⚀ (France) Kinéis × 5	Kinéis	Low Earth	IoT	In orbit	Operational
18 March; 01:31	Fifth of five dedicated launches for Kinéis' IoT satellite constellation.					
18 March; 19:57:50	(United States) Falcon 9 Block 5	Starlink Group 12-25	(United States) Cape Canaveral SLC-40		(United States) SpaceX	
18 March; 19:57:50	(United States) Starlink × 10	SpaceX	Low Earth	Communications	In orbit	Operational
18 March; 19:57:50	(United States) Starlink-D2C × 13	SpaceX	Low Earth	Communications	In orbit	Operational
21 March; 06:49	(United States) Falcon 9 Block 5	F9-450	(United States) Vandenberg SLC-4E		(United States) SpaceX	
21 March; 06:49	(United States) USA-487 - USA-497 (Starshield Group 1-7)	NRO	Low Earth (SSO)	Reconnaissance	In orbit	Operational
21 March; 06:49	NROL-57 Mission (NRO's Proliferated Architecture Mission). Eighth batch of SpaceX/Northrop built 11 Starshield satellites for the National Reconnaissance Office. B1088 set a new booster turnaround record of 9 days since its last launch.					
21 March; 11:07	(China) Ceres-1	Y17	(China) Jiuquan LS-95A		(China) Galactic Energy	
21 March; 11:07	(China) Yunyao-1 43-48	CGSTL	Low Earth (SSO)	Meteorology	In orbit	Operational
21 March; 11:07	Mission designated "Vernal Ascent".					
24 March; 17:48	(United States) Falcon 9 Block 5	F9-451	(United States) Cape Canaveral SLC-40		(United States) SpaceX	
24 March; 17:48	(United States) USA-498 (Intruder F/O-2/NOSS-4 2)	NRO / USN	Low Earth	SIGINT	In orbit	Operational
24 March; 17:48	NROL-69 Mission.					
26 March; 15:30	(United States) Electron	"Finding Hot Wildfires Near You"	(New Zealand) Mahia LC-1B		(United States) Rocket Lab	
26 March; 15:30	⚀ (Germany) OTC-P1 (Lemur-2) × 8	OroraTech	Low Earth	Earth observation	In orbit	Operational
26 March; 15:55	(China) Long March 3B/E	3B-Y08	(China) Xichang LC-2		(China) CASC	
26 March; 15:55	(China) Tianlian-2 04 (Tianlian-2D)	CAST	GTO to Geosynchronous	Communications	In orbit	Operational
26 March; 15:55	One of the Side boosters was equipped with a parachute to test impact mitigation.					
26 March; 22:11:40	(United States) Falcon 9 Block 5	Starlink Group 11-7	(United States) Vandenberg SLC-4E		(United States) SpaceX	
26 March; 22:11:40	(United States) Starlink × 27	SpaceX	Low Earth	Communications	In orbit	Operational
29 March; 16:05	(China) Long March 7A	7A-Y11	(China) Wenchang LC-2		(China) CASC	
29 March; 16:05	(China) TJS-16	SAST	GTO to Geosynchronous	Technology demonstration Communications	In orbit	Operational
30 March; 10:30	(Germany) Spectrum	"Going Full Spectrum"	(Norway) Andøya LP-A		(Germany) Isar Aerospace	
30 March; 10:30	(Germany) No payload	Isar Aerospace	Low Earth (SSO)	Flight test	30 March	Launch failure
30 March; 10:30	Maiden flight of Isar Aerospace's Spectrum rocket, first orbital rocket fueled by Propane and Liquid oxygen. First Orbital launch from Andøya Spaceport.					
31 March; 19:52:50	(United States) Falcon 9 Block 5	Starlink Group 6-80	(United States) Cape Canaveral SLC-40		(United States) SpaceX	
31 March; 19:52:50	(United States) Starlink × 28	SpaceX	Low Earth	Communications	In orbit	Operational
← Jan; Feb; Mar; Apr; May; Jun; Jul; Aug; Sep; Oct; Nov; Dec →
For flights after 31 March, see List of spaceflight launches in April–June 2025

== Suborbital flights ==
Date and time (UTC)	Rocket	Flight number	Launch site		LSP	
Date and time (UTC)	Payload (⚀ = CubeSat)	Operator	Orbit	Function	Decay (UTC)	Outcome
Date and time (UTC)	Remarks					
6 January; 03:00	(North Korea) Hwasong-16B		(North Korea) Chongdong		(North Korea) KPA Strategic Force	
6 January; 03:00	(North Korea)	KPA Strategic Force	Suborbital	Missile test	6 January	Successful
6 January; 03:00	Apogee: 100 km (62 mi).					
14 January; 00:15	(United States) Terrier-Terrier-Oriole	HTB-2	(United States) Wallops Flight Facility		(United States) NASA	
14 January; 00:15	(United States)	MDA	Suborbital	Technology demonstration	14 January	Successful
14 January; 00:15	Flight of a Hypersonic Test Bed (HTB) vehicle to provide a common platform for hypersonic experiments and HTBSS (Hypersonic and Ballistic Tracking Space Sensor) target					
16 January; 22:37:00	(United States) Starship	Flight 7	(United States) Starbase OLP-A		(United States) SpaceX	
16 January; 22:37:00	(United States) Starlink simulators × 10	SpaceX	Transatmospheric	Flight test	16 January	Launch failure
16 January; 22:37:00	Seventh Starship orbital test flight. Flight 7 featured the first flight of a Starship Block 2 Ship. The booster returned to the launch site and was captured by the tower, but the ship was lost on ascent.					
24 January; 17:35:00	(United States) Improved Malemute	ORIGIN I	(Sweden) Esrange		TBA	
24 January; 17:35:00	(Sweden) ORIGIN	KTH	Suborbital	Nightglow observation	24 January	Successful
24 January; 17:35:00	First flight of the ORIGIN launch campaign.					
2 February; 07:07	(Canada) Black Brant IX	NASA 36.381GE	(United States) Poker Flat Research Range		(United States) NASA	
2 February; 07:07	(United States) GIRAFF	Goddard Space Flight Center	Suborbital	Auroral electrodynamics	2 February	Successful
2 February; 07:07	First of two launches for the Ground Imaging to Rocket investigation of Auroral Fast Features (GIRAFF) mission.					
4 February; 16:00	(United States) New Shepard	NS-29	(United States) Corn Ranch		(United States) Blue Origin	
4 February; 16:00	(United States) Blue Origin NS-29	Blue Origin	Suborbital	Technology demonstration	4 February	Successful
4 February; 16:00	Apogee: 105 km (65 mi)					
9 February; 08:35	(Canada) Black Brant IX	NASA 36.380GE	(United States) Poker Flat Research Range		(United States) NASA	
9 February; 08:35	(United States) GIRAFF	Goddard Space Flight Center	Suborbital	Auroral electrodynamics	9 February	Successful
9 February; 08:35	Second of two launches for the GIRAFF mission.					
19 February; 09:00	(United States) Minuteman III	GT-252GM	(United States) Vandenberg LF-9		(United States) AFGSC	
19 February; 09:00	(United States)	AFGSC	Suborbital	Test flight	19 February	Successful
19 February; 09:00	Re-entered ~4,200 mi (6,800 km) downrange near Kwajalein Atoll.					
25 February; 15:49:11	(United States) New Shepard	NS-30	(United States) Corn Ranch		(United States) Blue Origin	
25 February; 15:49:11	(United States) Blue Origin NS-30	Blue Origin	Suborbital	Space tourism	25 February	Successful
25 February; 15:49:11	Apogee: 107 km (66 mi). Tenth crewed New Shepard flight. Crew of six.					
6 March; 23:30:31	(United States) Starship	Flight 8	(United States) Starbase OLP-A		(United States) SpaceX	
6 March; 23:30:31	(United States) Starlink simulators × 4	SpaceX	Transatmospheric	Flight test	6 March	Launch failure
6 March; 23:30:31	Eighth Starship orbital test flight. The booster returned to the launch site and was captured by the tower, but the ship was lost on ascent.					
11 March; 09:15:00	(United States) Improved Orion		(Sweden) Esrange		(Germany) MORABA / (Sweden) SNSA	
11 March; 09:15:00	(Germany) (Sweden) REXUS-33	DLR / SNSA	Suborbital	Education	11 March	Successful
11 March; 09:15:00	Apogee: 78 km (48 mi).					
13 March; 05:23:00	(United States) Improved Orion		(Sweden) Esrange		(Germany) MORABA / (Sweden) SNSA	
13 March; 05:23:00	(Germany) (Sweden) REXUS-34	DLR / SNSA	Suborbital	Education	13 March	Successful
20 March	(Yemen) Palestine 2		(Yemen)		(Yemen) Houthis	
20 March	(Yemen) Live warhead	Houthis	Suborbital	Missile launch	20 March	Intercepted
20 March	Targeted Israel.					
20 March	(Yemen) Zulfiqar		(Yemen)		(Yemen) Houthis	
20 March	(Yemen) Live warhead	Houthis	Suborbital	Missile launch	20 March	Intercepted
20 March	Targeted Israel.					
21 March	(Yemen) Zulfiqar		(Yemen)		(Yemen) Houthis	
21 March	(Yemen) Live warhead	Houthis	Suborbital	Missile launch	21 March	Intercepted
21 March	Targeted Israel.					
23 March	(Yemen) Zulfiqar		(Yemen)		(Yemen) Houthis	
23 March	(Yemen) Live warhead	Houthis	Suborbital	Missile launch	23 March	Intercepted
23 March	Targeted Israel.					
24 March	(Yemen) Zulfiqar		(Yemen)		(Yemen) Houthis	
24 March	(Yemen) Live warhead	Houthis	Suborbital	Missile launch	24 March	Intercepted
24 March	Targeted Israel.					
24 March	(United States) MRBM	FTX-40	(United States) Boeing C-17 Globemaster III, Pacific Ocean		(United States) MDA	
24 March	(United States) HTV	MDA	Suborbital	Missile target	24 March	Successful
24 March	Flight Test Other-40 (FTX-40) Stellar Banshee test of the Aegis Ballistic Missile Defense System, tracking exercise included firing a simulated Standard Missile (SM)-6 upgraded missile at the target, an air-launched Medium Range Ballistic Missile (MRBM) with a Hypersonic Target Vehicle (HTV) - 1 front end.					
25 March; 11:52	(United States) Terrier-Improved Malemute	NASA 46.034UE	(United States) Poker Flat Research Range		(United States) NASA	
25 March; 11:52	(United States) AWESOME	University of Alaska Fairbanks	Suborbital	Auroral science	25 March	Successful
25 March; 11:52	First of three launches for the Auroral Waves Excited by Substorm Onset Magnetic Events (AWESOME) mission.					
25 March; 12:30	(Canada) Black Brant XII-A	NASA 52.010UE	(United States) Poker Flat Research Range		(United States) NASA	
25 March; 12:30	(United States) AWESOME	University of Alaska Fairbanks	Suborbital	Auroral science	25 March	Successful
25 March; 12:30	Second of three launches for the AWESOME mission.					
29 March; 09:30	(United States) Terrier-Improved Malemute	NASA 46.035UE	(United States) Poker Flat Research Range		(United States) NASA	
29 March; 09:30	(United States) AWESOME	University of Alaska Fairbanks	Suborbital	Auroral science	29 March	Successful
29 March; 09:30	Third of three launches for the AWESOME mission.					
