= PRSC-EO2 =

Earth observation satellite of Pakistan

- Mission type: Earth observation
- Operator: SUPARCO

Spacecraft properties
- Spacecraft: PRSC-EO2
- Spacecraft type: Earth observation satellite
- Manufacturer: SUPARCO (with international cooperation)

Start of mission
- Launch date: 12 February 2026, 06:37 UTC
- Rocket: Jielong-3
- Launch site: Sea-based platform, South China Sea
- Entered service: 2026

Orbital parameters
- Reference system: Geocentric
- Regime: Low Earth orbit (Sun-synchronous)
- PRSC Earth observation program

PRSC-EO2 is a Pakistani Earth observation satellite developed by the Space and Upper Atmosphere Research Commission (SUPARCO) for remote sensing applications including agriculture, disaster monitoring, urban planning and environmental observation.

== History ==
It was launched on 12 February 2026 at 06:37 UTC aboard a Jielong-3 rocket from a sea-based platform in the South China Sea, China, as part of a multi-satellite mission. The satellite was successfully inserted into a Sun-synchronous low Earth orbit and is currently operational as part of Pakistan’s expanding Earth observation program.

== See also ==
- PRSC-EO1
- PRSC-EO3
