= PRSC-EO1 satellite =

Remote sensing satellite of Pakistan

- Mission type: Earth observation satellite
- Operator: SUPARCO

Spacecraft properties
- Spacecraft: PRSC-EO1
- Manufacturer: SUPARCO

Start of mission
- Launch date: January 17, 2025, 12:07 pm BT (04:07 UTC)
- Rocket: Chang Zheng 2D
- Launch site: Jiuquan Satellite Launch Centre
- Contractor: CASC
- PRSC Earth observation program

PRSC-EO1 (Pakistan Remote Sensing Satellite - Earth Observation 1) is an Electro-Optical Satellite developed by Pakistan's Space Agency (SUPARCO). It was launched from China's Jiuquan Satellite Centre on January 17, 2025, by China Great Wall Industry Corporation (CGWIC), a subsidiary of the China Aerospace Science and Technology Corporation (CASC). The PRSC-EO1 is Pakistan's first domestically produced observation satellite. The satellite was Pakistan's 2nd launch in just under a week. Previously, Pakistan launched PAUSAT-1 satellite, on SpaceX's Falcon 9 on January 14, 2025.

== Background ==
The launch of PRSC-EO1 is part of a broader initiative under the "Space Vision 2040", which seeks to establish Pakistan self-reliant in satellite launching and development capabilities. Under this vision, SUPARCO announced a new program of three optical remote sensing satellites called PRSC-EOS and the PRSC-EO1 is first of three satellites. Then, In 2022, the China Great Wall Industry Corporation reached an agreement with SUPARCO. providing multi-launch services for a SUPARCO satellite. In addition to that, CGWIC also provided Pakistani satellite with Telemetry, Tracking, and Command support for Launch and Early Orbit Phase support.

== Launch ==
PRSC-EO1 was launched on January 17, 2025, 12:07pm (Beijing Time) by Long March-2D (LM-2D) from the Jiuquan Satellite Launch Center in the autonomous region of Inner Mongolia. The satellite was launched besides two other Chinese satellites Tianlu 1 and Lantan 1. The official launch ceremony was held at the SUPARCO Complex in Karachi where the launch was broadcast live.

== Objectives ==
PRSC-EO1 is earth observation satellite. Its primary purpose is to monitor earth and support land mapping in agriculture, disaster management, urban planning and resource planning. PRSC-EO1 will also help in infrastructure tracking, natural resource conservation, environmental monitoring, and providing real-time response to disasters.

== Specifications ==
The Satellite is Pakistan's first domestically produced (EO) electro-optical remote sensing satellite and is equipped with a high-resolution optical payload designed to capture multi-spectral images with a potential resolution of up to 1 meter.

== See also ==
- PRSC-EO2
- PRSC-EO3
