= VZLÚ HC-3 =

Czechoslovak helicopter

Aero HC-3
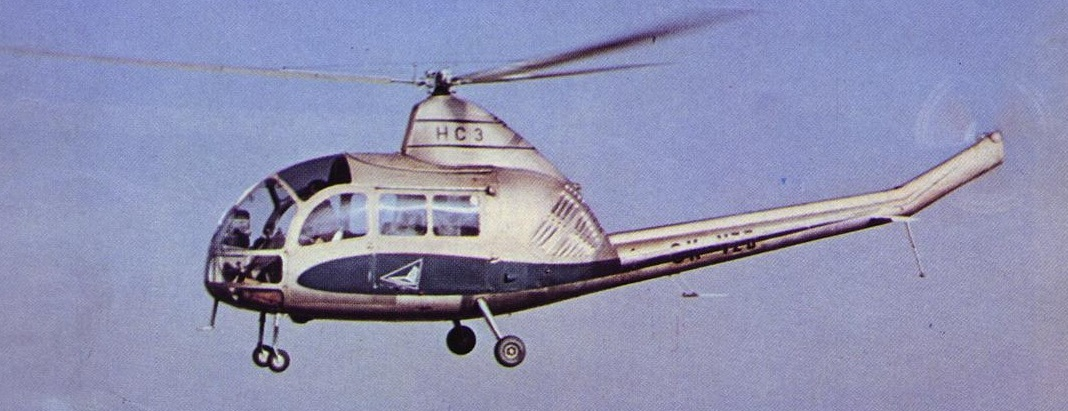
- HC-3 prototype

General information
- Type: light helicopter
- National origin: Czechoslovakia
- Manufacturer: VZLÚ
- Number built: 3

History
- First flight: 16 May 1960

The HC-3 (Note: Sometimes called the Aero HC-3, although the type was designed and the prototypes built at the VZLÚ, with production planned at Moravan Otrokovice.) was a prototype Czechoslovak four–five seater helicopter. Three examples were built, with the first flying in 1961, but no production followed.

== Development and design ==
In early 1956, work began at the VZLÚ, (Note: Czech:Vyzkummy a Zkusebni Letecky Ústav, the Czechoslovak national aeronautic research institute.) on a new three–four seat helicopter, based on the two-seat HC-2, which was intended for both civil and military use. The resulting design, the HC-3, had a streamlined semi-monocoque fuselage and a low-mounted tailboom carrying the tail rotor. The three-bladed main rotor was of wooden construction, as was the tail rotor (also three bladed). The engine was mounted at the rear of the fuselage, behind a firewall, while the helicopter had a four-wheeled, non-retractable undercarriage, with the front two wheels castoring through 360 degrees. The helicopter had seats for 4 or 5 people, with dual controls being provided for pilot and co-pilot. The interior could be quickly reconfigured to carry two stretcher patients and a medical attendant.

Three HC-3 prototypes (registrations OK-15 to OK-17) were built at the VZLÚ, although serial production was planned to take at the Moravan Otrokovice factory where Zlín light aircraft were built. The first example, powered by a Walter M-108H air-cooled six-cylinder horizontally-opposed piston engine rated at 162 kW (217 hp) at take-off, flying on 16 May 1961. The helicopter was underpowered with this engine, and was not capable of meeting the required performance; for example, it could not hover out of ground effect. In an attempt to rectify this problem, staff at the VZLÚ modified the engine to increase power, resulting in the M-108DH, with a takeoff power of 202 kW (271 hp). While the greater power improved the helicopter's performance, it still did not fully meet requirements, and the engine was modified by adding a supercharger that could be selected by the pilot, giving a short term boost to 220 kW (300 hp), with the further modified engine designated as the M-108DHK. With the M-108DHK, the HC-3 met all requirements, being able to hover out of ground-effect at an altitude of 1,000 m (3,300 ft) and to continue to climb vertically.

While the M-108DHK-powered aircraft met performance requirements, it was not placed into production. The modified M-108DHK engine was only a single prototype and not in production, while the Czechoslovak aircraft industry was ordered to concentrate on production of the Aero L-29 Delfín jet trainer, with work on helicopters being suspended.

When it had been realised that the HC-3 needed more power, design teams at Moravan Otrokovice and the VZLÚ each produced modified designs with new engines. Moravan Otrokovice chose to use two Walter M 337 engines, each rated at 154 kW (207 hp), while the VZLÚ team chose to fit a single Soviet Ivchenko AI-14 radial engine, rated at 220 hp (160 kW). VZLÚ's proposal was preferred, and the second prototype (registration OK-16) was modified to use the AI-14 engine, gaining the new designation HC-3A. Testing late in 1962 proved successful, but the suspension of helicopter development led to work on the HC-3A being stopped, and not restarted until the second half of 1964.

The third prototype, registration OK-17, was also fitted with the AI-14 engine, and was used to carry out state trials, while OK-16 carried out factory trials (which included testing against the British BCAR regulations for certifying helicopters). Both factory and state testing was successfully completed by November 1965, but again, no production followed. The Czechoslovak aircraft industry did not have sufficient capacity to build the HC-3A in time to meet customer deadlines.

== Service ==
The two AI-14 powered helicopters, now registered OK-VZA and OK-VZB, were used by the East German film director Andrew Thorndike as camera platforms in 1966–1967, flying over 350 hours during filming. The HC-3A was also tested as an agricultural aircraft, and fitted with spray bars for dispersing chemicals, and in 1966, OK-VZB was used for tests of the suitability of the HC-3 for combat duties, being fitted with rocket pods and suitable weapon sights. A dedicated gunship version was proposed, with a slimline fuselage and the crew of two seating in tandem, while the proposed armament consisted of a machine gun under the nose and rocket pods on pylons mounted on the side of the fuselage. The gunship derivative remained at the design stage, with no prototype built. The two AI-14-powered helicopters continued in use at the VZLÚ until 1972, when they were transferred to the Kbely Aviation Museum. One of the helicopters was taken from storage at Kbely for restoration in 1991, but following the Dissolution of Czechoslovakia in 1992, became the property of Slovakia, and in 2023 was transferred to a military museum at Piešťany.

== Variants ==
HC-3

- Initial standard, powered by M-108H flat-six engine. Three prototypes built.

HC-3A

- Revised version, powered by Ivchenko AI-14 radial engine. Two prototypes modified to this standard.

HC-103

- Proposed version powered by two Walter M 337 engines. Unbuilt.

HC-3T

- 1967 study for turbine powered version of HC-3, powered by Walter M601H turboshaft engine.

== Specifications (HC-3A) ==
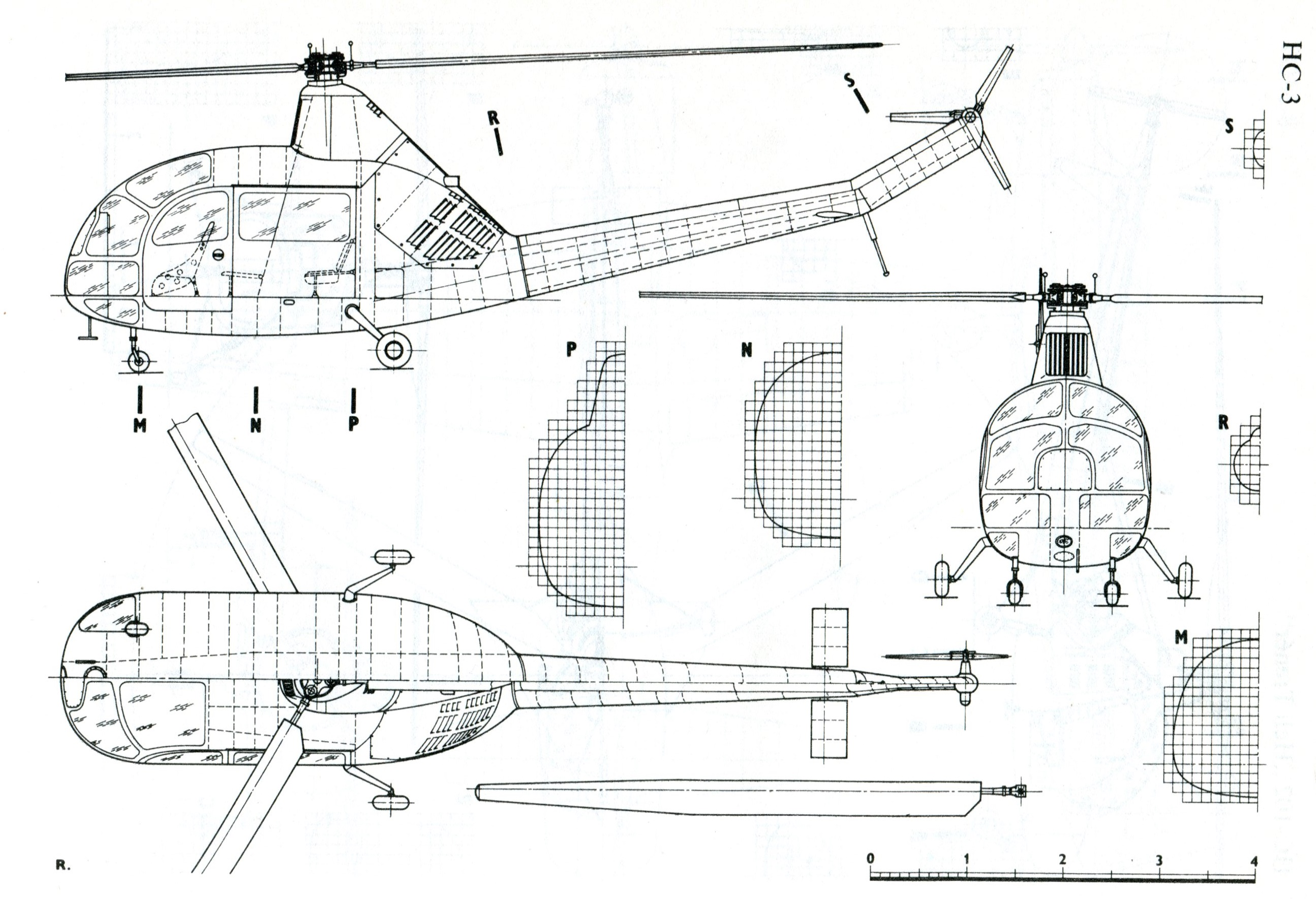

Data from Vrtulníky Našich Konstruktérů

General characteristics

- Crew: 2
- Capacity: 3
- Length: 13.4 m (44 ft 0 in) (overall length), 10.0 m (32 ft 10 in) (fuselage length)
- Height: 3.4 m (11 ft 2 in)
- Empty weight: 1,065 kg (2,348 lb)
- Gross weight: 1,550 kg (3,417 lb)
- Powerplant: 1 × Ivchenko AI-14VF nine-cylinder air-cooled radial engine, 220 kW (300 hp)
- Main rotor diameter: 11.6 m (38 ft 1 in)
- Main rotor area: 106 m^{2} (1,140 sq ft)

Performance

- Maximum speed: 183 km/h (114 mph, 99 kn)
- Cruise speed: 160 km/h (99 mph, 86 kn)
- Range: 252 km (157 mi, 136 nmi)
- Service ceiling: 5,600 m (18,400 ft)
- Rate of climb: 6.8 m/s (1,340 ft/min)
