= Electrojet Zeeman Imaging Explorer =

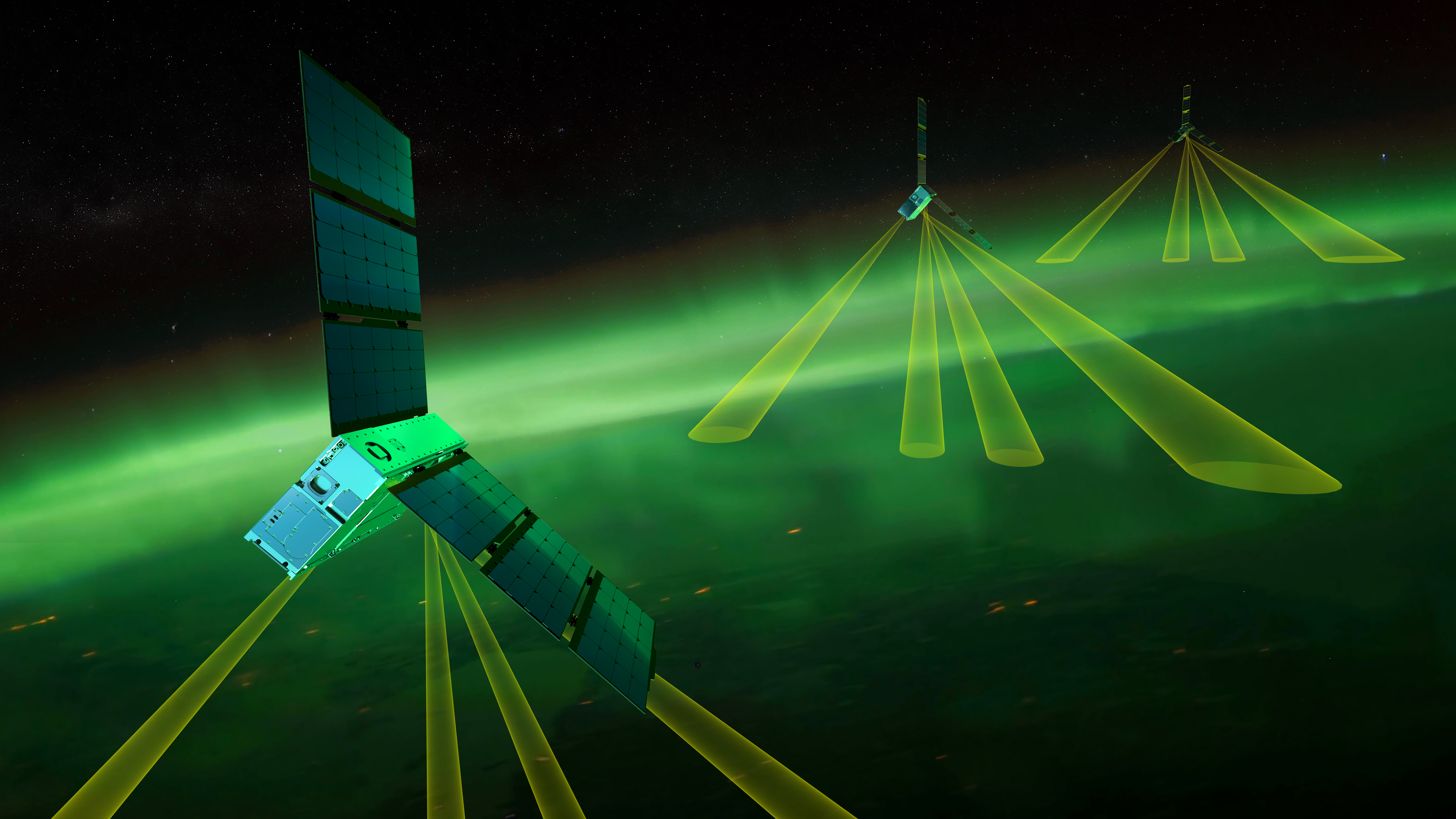
- Artist's concept of the EZIE satellites
- Names: EZIE
- Mission type: Magnetospheric research
- Operator: NASA
- COSPAR ID: 2025-052AP (EZIE-A); 2025-052AS (EZIE-B); 2025-052AR (EZIE-C)
- Website: https://ezie.jhuapl.edu
- Mission duration: 18 months (planned)

Spacecraft properties
- Manufacturer: Blue Canyon Technologies

Start of mission
- Launch date: 15 March 2025
- Rocket: Falcon 9 Block 5
- Contractor: SpaceX

Orbital parameters
- Reference system: Geocentric orbit
- Regime: Sun-synchronous, low Earth orbit

Electrojet Zeeman Imaging Explorer (EZIE) is a NASA heliophysics mission that studies the Sun and space weather near Earth. It consists of three CubeSats that observe the auroral electrojets, by exploring a phenomenon called Zeeman splitting – the splitting of a molecule’s light spectrum in a magnetic field. EZIE was launched on 14 March 2025 on SpaceX Transporter-13 Mission as a rideshare payload.

EZIE satellites captured "first light" on March 19; one of the three satellites successfully recorded Zeeman splitting of the 118 GHz oxygen emission line for the first time with its Microwave Electrojet Magnetogram (MEM) instrument.

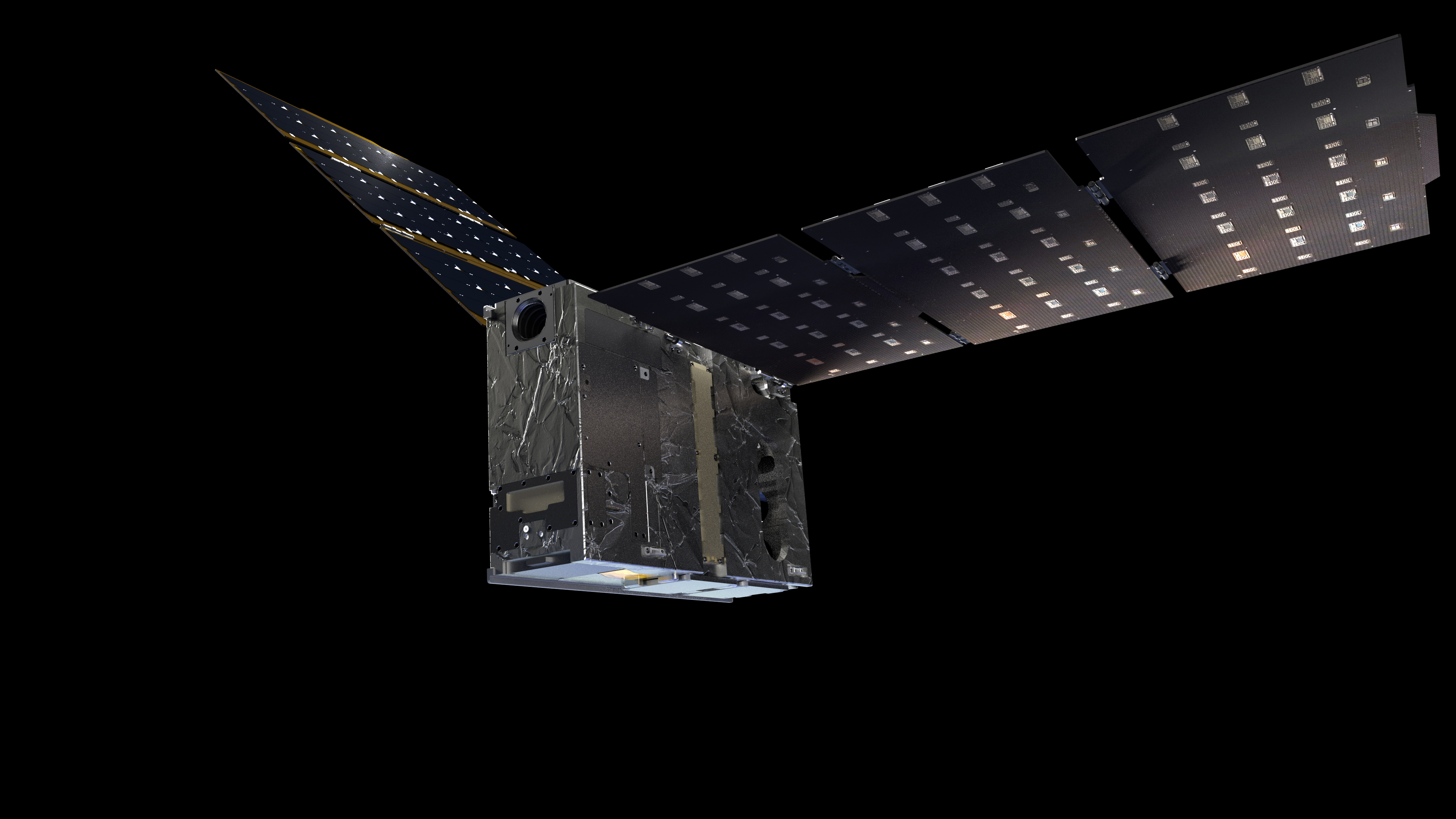

== Spacecraft design ==
The three EZIE spacecraft were developed under the leadership of the Johns Hopkins University Applied Physics Laboratory (APL), with Blue Canyon Technologies providing the CubeSat bus and NASA’s Jet Propulsion Laboratory (JPL) providing the Microwave Electrojet Magnetogram (MEM) instrument. Each spacecraft is a 6U CubeSat, with the constellation configuration and 6U form factor described in mission conference materials. The satellites are three-axis stabilized and powered by deployable solar panels.

Instead of onboard propulsion, EZIE uses atmospheric drag to adjust and maintain the relative spacing of the three spacecraft, flying in a “pearls-on-a-string” configuration roughly 2–10 minutes apart. The mission operates in a Sun-synchronous polar low Earth orbit at an altitude of roughly 420–590 km (260–370 mi).

Each CubeSat carries JPL’s MEM instrument, which measures the Zeeman splitting of the 118 GHz oxygen emission line to infer the strength and dynamics of auroral electrojets. The planned primary mission duration is 18 months.

=== Computer and software ===
EZIE science operations are managed at the Science Operations Center (SOC) using the SciBox autonomous mission planning system, developed at APL. SciBox automates the generation of flight command sequences, optimizes operations planning, enforces spacecraft and ground-station constraints, and maximizes data return by evaluating experiment schedules, onboard storage limits, downlink availability, and orbital geometry.

For EZIE, SciBox automatically produces daily command schedules with a 4–14 day outlook and supports more autonomous “hands-off” operations.
