= SciBox =

Automated mission planning and command system for space operations

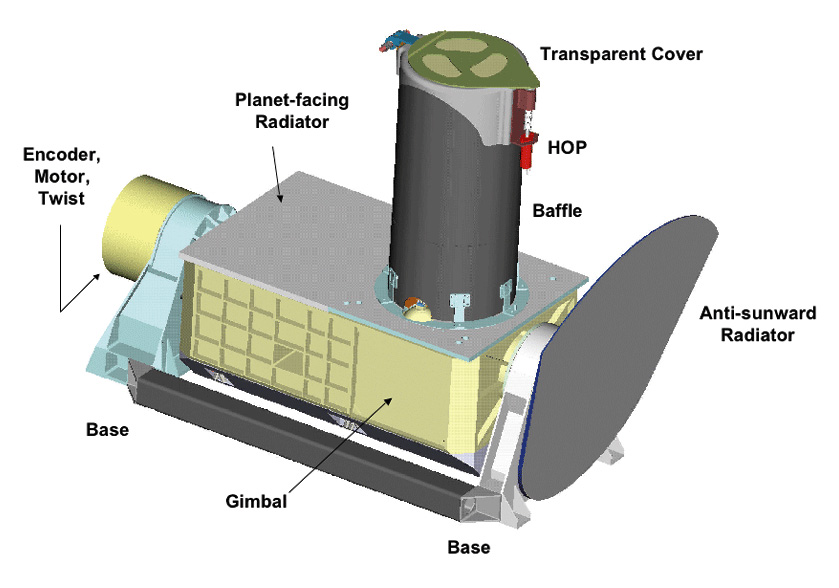
- The CRISM instrument on Mars Reconnaissance Orbiter, a mission whose weekly operations were planned and commanded using SciBox.
- Original author: Teck H. Choo
- Developer: JHU Applied Physics Laboratory
- Initial release: 2001 (first modules)
- Written in: Java
- Operating system: Cross-platform
- Type: Mission planning and commanding system (space operations)
- License: Proprietary

SciBox is an automated, end-to-end mission planning and commanding system developed by the Johns Hopkins University Applied Physics Laboratory (APL) for spacecraft and instrument operations. It translates high-level science objectives into validated, conflict-free command sequences for payloads, spacecraft subsystems, and ground stations, and has been used operationally on missions including MESSENGER, the Mars Reconnaissance Orbiter’s CRISM instrument, and EZIE.

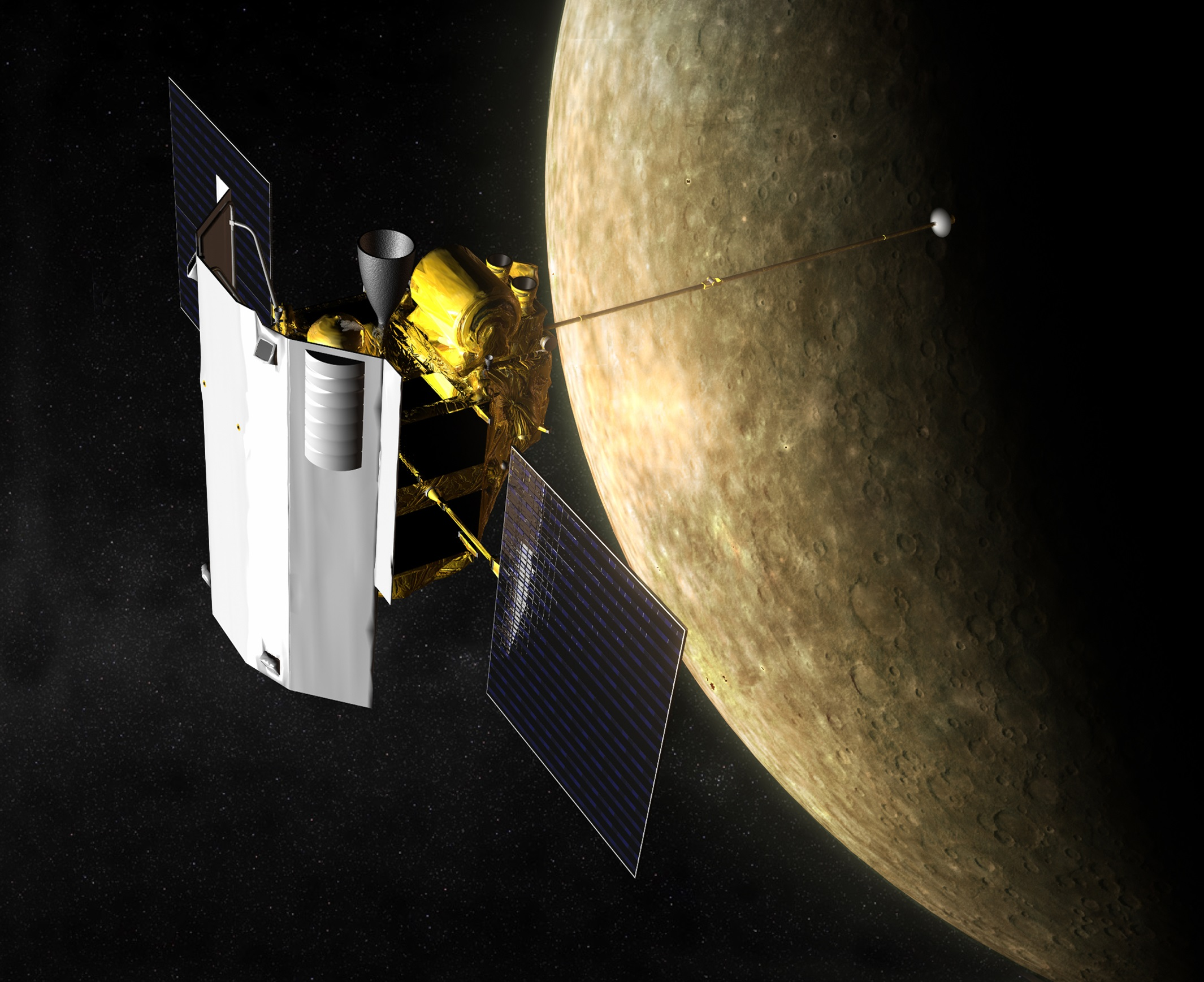
SciBox planned and commanded the orbital science operations of MESSENGER at Mercury.

== Design ==
SciBox provides automated opportunity analysis, constraint checking, scheduling, command generation, and validation for space operations. The system derives commands directly from user requests, resolves resource conflicts, and produces uploadable sequences accompanied by machine-generated reports for review. It is equipped with ten sensors, a solar panel, a guidance, navigation, and control system, and radio-frequency transmission.

To create a schedule, SciBox searches all available science opportunities and checks to see if observational criteria are met. For opportunities that pass, SciBox then ranks possible opportunities based on priority and weighted metrics measuring the projected quality of the data, such as signal strength, resolution, and illumination. SciBox then selects the best combination of opportunities, scheduling the opportunities from highest- to lowest-ranked until resources are exhausted.

== History and development ==
The Johns Hopkins University Applied Physics Laboratory began investing in SciBox in 2001. The tool was designed to autonomously handle data collection scheduling, commands, and conflict resolution, a process that is difficult and time-consuming to do manually.

SciBox was demonstrated in scientific practice in 2001 on the polar orbiter TIMED, where it used a coincidence calculator plan co-observations. In 2002, SciBox was extended for Cassini’s MIMI, where it was used in the JCSN planning tool that took into account potential hazards, such as sunlight and dust particles, when optimizing schedules. In 2005, SciBox was used in the JMRO planning tool of the CRISM instrument on Mars Reconnaissance Orbiter.

In 2011, SciBox was scaled to a mission-level system for MESSENGER, where it planned and commanded all orbital science observations as well as guidance-and-control operations throughout the orbital campaign, automatically generating conflict-free command sequences from prioritized science objectives. Over four years, the system scheduled approximately 294,000 images, more than five million infrared spectra, more than six million ultraviolet/exosphere spectra, and more than 41 million laser-altimeter shots, with no commanding anomalies reported.

In 2019, SciBox supported the CubeSat Signal Preprocessor Assessment and Test (CAT). Planning and commanding two 3U CubeSats in LEO.

In March of 2025, SciBox began automating the generation of flight command sequences for NASA's three-CubeSat heliophysics mission: EZIE. Architecture relied on reuse of smallsat operations capabilities demonstrated on earlier missions.
