= VZLUSAT-1 =

Czech technology demonstration satellite

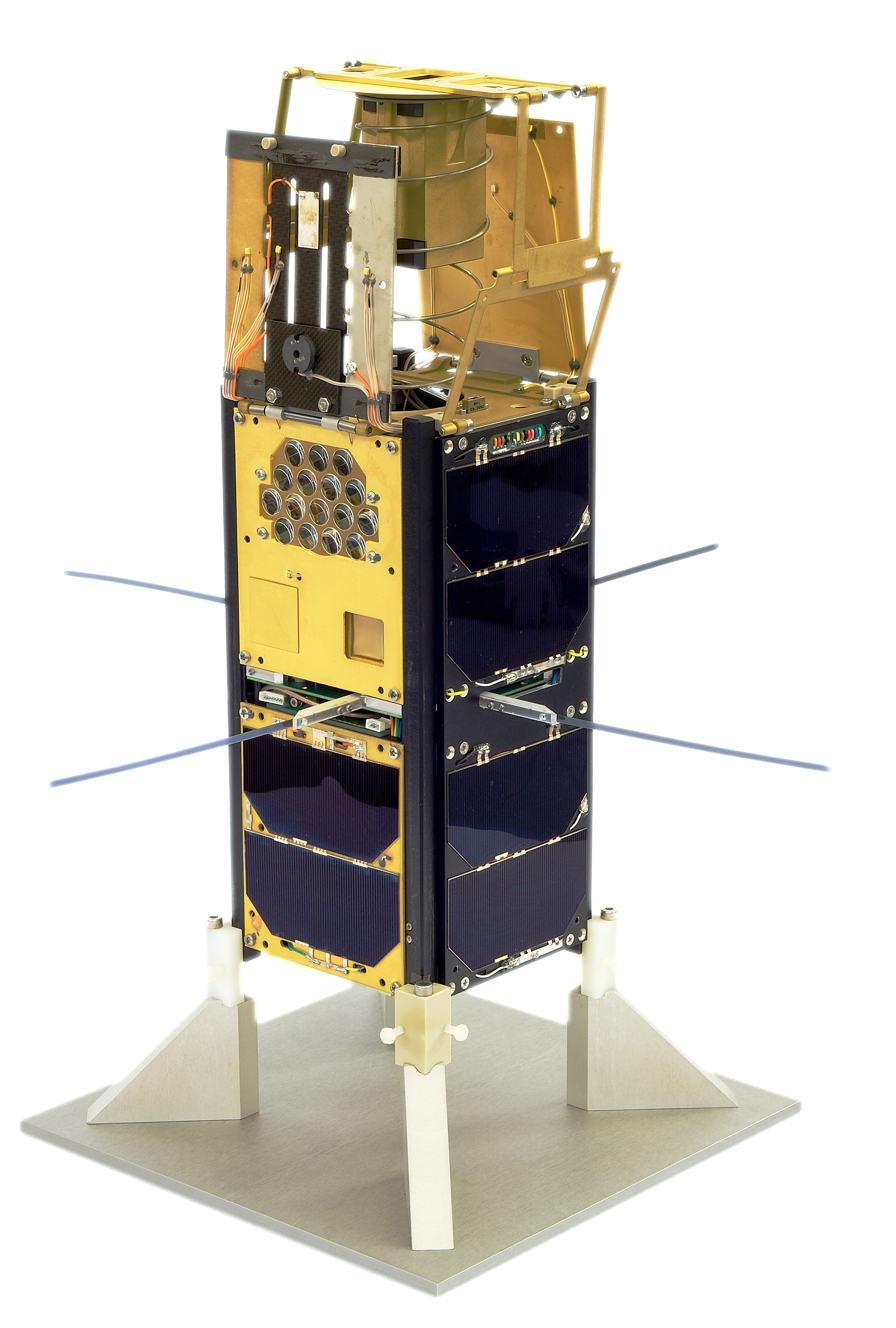
- Operator: VZLU Aerospace
- COSPAR ID: 2017-036AB
- SATCAT no.: 42790
- Website: www.vzlu.cz/vzlusat1

Spacecraft properties
- Spacecraft type: 2U CubeSat

Start of mission
- Launch date: 23 June 2017
- Rocket: PSLV-XL

End of mission
- Decay date: 6 June 2023

VZLUSAT-1 was a Czech technology demonstration satellite operated in low Earth orbit between 2017 and 2023 by the Prague-based company VZLU Aerospace. The 2U-type CubeSat was testing various spaceflight technologies including a miniaturized X-ray telescope and composite material radiation shielding. It was also performing scientific measurements of oxygen concentration in Earth atmosphere. The satellite was launched in June 2017 by the Indian PSLV-XL rocket, operated successfully in space for almost six years and more than 33,000 orbits, and ended its mission with destructive re-entry in June 2023. At that time, it was the longest operating Czech satellite to date and the second longest operating 2U CubeSat ever.
