= TROLL (satellite) =

Czech Earth observation satellite

- Mission type: Earth observation
- Operator: (Czech Republic) TRL Space
- COSPAR ID: 2025-009BB

Spacecraft properties
- Bus: 6U CubeSat

Start of mission
- Launch date: 14 January 2025
- Rocket: Falcon 9

TROLL is a Czech Earth observation and technology demonstration CubeSat-type satellite developed by the Brno-based company TRL Space. The satellite carries a hyperspectral imaging camera and a data processing unit for on-orbit image processing. The satellite was launched on Falcon 9's Transporter 12 mission, together with another Czech satellite SATurnin-1, on 14 January 2025.

The satellite is used for environmental monitoring, agriculture, and security purposes. One of the customers using the satellite's data is the Czech Environmental Inspectorate, part of the country's Ministry of the Environment. The inspectorate is using the data e.g. for detecting illegal landfills and waste dumps in forested areas.

== See also ==
- List of Czech satellites
