= AMBIC =

Czech Earth observation satellite

- Mission type: Earth observation satellite
- Operator: (Czech Republic) VZLU
- Website: www.ambic.cz/en/

Spacecraft properties
- Manufacturer: VZLU Aerospace / OHB Czechspace / ESC Aerospace / World from Space
- Launch mass: 140 kilograms (310 lb)

Start of mission
- Launch date: 2030 (planned)

AMBIC (AMBItious Czech satellite) is a future Earth observation satellite under development by the Prague-based company VZLU Aerospace with the support of the Czech government and the European Space Agency (ESA). Its goal is to provide optical observations of Earth surface for the needs of Czech public institutions. AMBIC is expected to launch in 2030.

== Background ==
QUVIK is a collaboration between VZLU, OHB Czechspace, ESC Aerospace, and World from Space. The mission has been selected for realization by the Czech Ministry of Transport and ESA in 2023 together with another VZLU-led satellite mission called QUVIK with an expected budget of €30 million each.

== Objectives ==
The mission aims to provide up to 400 images per day in both black-and-white and color, with a ground sample distance of 1.2 meters. The data are intended to serve Czech government agencies in responding to natural disasters, monitoring waste management and protected areas, as well as planning and monitoring transport infrastructure.

== See also ==
- List of European Space Agency programmes and missions
- List of Czech satellites
