= VZLUGEM =

Czech space mission for demonstrating proximity operations

- Operator: VZLU Aerospace
- Website: www.vzlugem.cz

Spacecraft properties
- Bus: 2x 6U CubeSat
- Dimensions: 2x 30/20/10 cm

Start of mission
- Launch date: 2027 (expected)

VZLUGEM (VZLU Guardian Eyes Mission) is a future double satellite space mission under development by the Czech company VZLU Aerospace. Its goal is to demonstrate proximity operations useful for future applications in space debris removal, satellite servicing, or defense. The mission consist of two small satellites of identical dimensions launched on the same rocket. One satellite will serve as a passive target while the other will maneuver towards it using its propulsion and perform visual inspection using a camera. Work on the satellites hardware begun in June 2026. They are expected to launch in 2027.

== See also ==
- List of Czech satellites
- Tom & Jerry – European technology demonstration satellite mission
