= QUVIK =

Czech space telescope

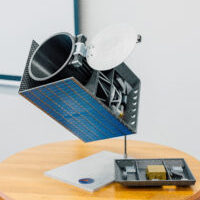
- Mission type: Space telescope for UV Photometry
- Operator: (Czech Republic) VZLU
- Website: quvik.cz

Spacecraft properties
- Manufacturer: VZLU / TOPTEC
- Launch mass: 130 kilograms (290 lb)

Start of mission
- Launch date: 2028 (planned)

Main telescope
- Type: Maksutov-Cassegrain

QUVIK (Quick Ultra-Violet Kilonovae Surveyor) is a future ultraviolet space telescope under development by the Prague-based company VZLU Aerospace with the support of the Czech government and the European Space Agency (ESA). It will be the first space telescope developed in Czechia. QUVIK is expected to launch in 2028.

== Background ==
QUVIK is a collaboration between VZLU, Masaryk University, TOPTEC (Institute of Plasma Physics), and PEKASAT. The mission has been selected for realization by the Czech Ministry of Transport and ESA in 2023 together with another VZLU-led satellite mission called AMBIC with an expected budget of €30 million each.

== Objectives ==
Its primary focus is the study of kilonovae and their role in the formation of elements heavier than iron. It will also probe the accretion disks of black holes with high-cadence monitoring and study the UV emissions of stars and active galactic nuclei.

== See also ==
- List of European Space Agency programmes and missions
- List of Czech satellites
