= SATurnin-1 =

Czech Earth observation satellite

- Mission type: Earth observation
- Operator: (Czech Republic) VZLU Aerospace
- COSPAR ID: 2025-009M

Spacecraft properties
- Bus: 12U CubeSat

Start of mission
- Launch date: 14 January 2025
- Rocket: Falcon 9

SATurnin-1 is a Czech Earth observation satellite developed by the Prague company VZLU Aerospace with the support of Czech government. At the time of its launch in 2025, it was the largest spacecraft yet developed in Czechia. Its main instrument is an optical telescope for Earth imaging with a capacity of up to 100 images per day, which serves Czech authorities in the fields of defense, security, and crisis management. It was named after a character from Zdeněk Jirotka's 1942 novel Saturnin. The satellite was launched on Falcon 9's Transporter 12 mission, together with another Czech satellite TROLL, on 14 January 2025 and delivered its first images in April 2025.
