= Inversion Space =

American aerospace company

- Type: Private
- Industry: Aerospace and defense technology; spacecraft
- Founded: 2021
- Founder: Justin Fiaschetti and Austin Briggs
- Headquarters: Los Angeles, California
- Area served: United States

Inversion Space is an aerospace and defense technology startup developing space-based delivery vehicles. The company aims to deliver cargo to militaries at short notice from space. It is headquartered in Los Angeles, California.

== History ==
The company was founded in 2021 by Boston University students Justin Fiaschetti and Austin Briggs. In October 2024, the company obtained a re-entry license for its Ray spacecraft from the Federal Aviation Administration's (FAA) commercial transportation office. In May 2025 the company completed its flight of the Ray vehicle, but without reentry. The flight was part of SpaceX's Transporter-12 rideshare mission. In October 2025, the company unveiled its Arc re-entry vehicle. The vehicle carries a payload of 500 pounds of cargo. In March 2025 the US military selected the company for its MACH-TB hypersonic testing program.

== Funding ==
In 2024 the company raised $44 million in Series A funding on top of its $10 million in seed funding. It was also awarded a $71 million STRATFI award by Air Force Research Laboratory and SpaceWERX in September 2024.
