= VZLUSAT-2 =

Czech technology demonstration satellite

- Operator: VZLU Aerospace
- COSPAR ID: 2022-002DF
- SATCAT no.: 51085
- Website: www.vzlu.cz/vzlusat2

Spacecraft properties
- Spacecraft type: 3U CubeSat

Start of mission
- Launch date: 13 January 2022
- Rocket: Falcon 9

End of mission
- Decay date: 30 November 2025

VZLUSAT-2 was a Czech technology demonstration satellite operated in low Earth orbit between 2022 and 2025 by the Prague-based company VZLU Aerospace. The 3U-type CubeSat was testing various spaceflight technologies including two Earth observation cameras, X-ray sensors, a GRB detector, a radiation monitoring device, and a water vapor outgassing sensor. The satellite was launched in January 2022 on the Transporter-3 rideshare mission of Falcon 9, operated successfully in space, and ended its mission with destructive re-entry in November 2025. VZLUSAT-2 was the first Czech spacecraft to capture high-resolution images of the Czech Republic from orbit.

== Gallery ==
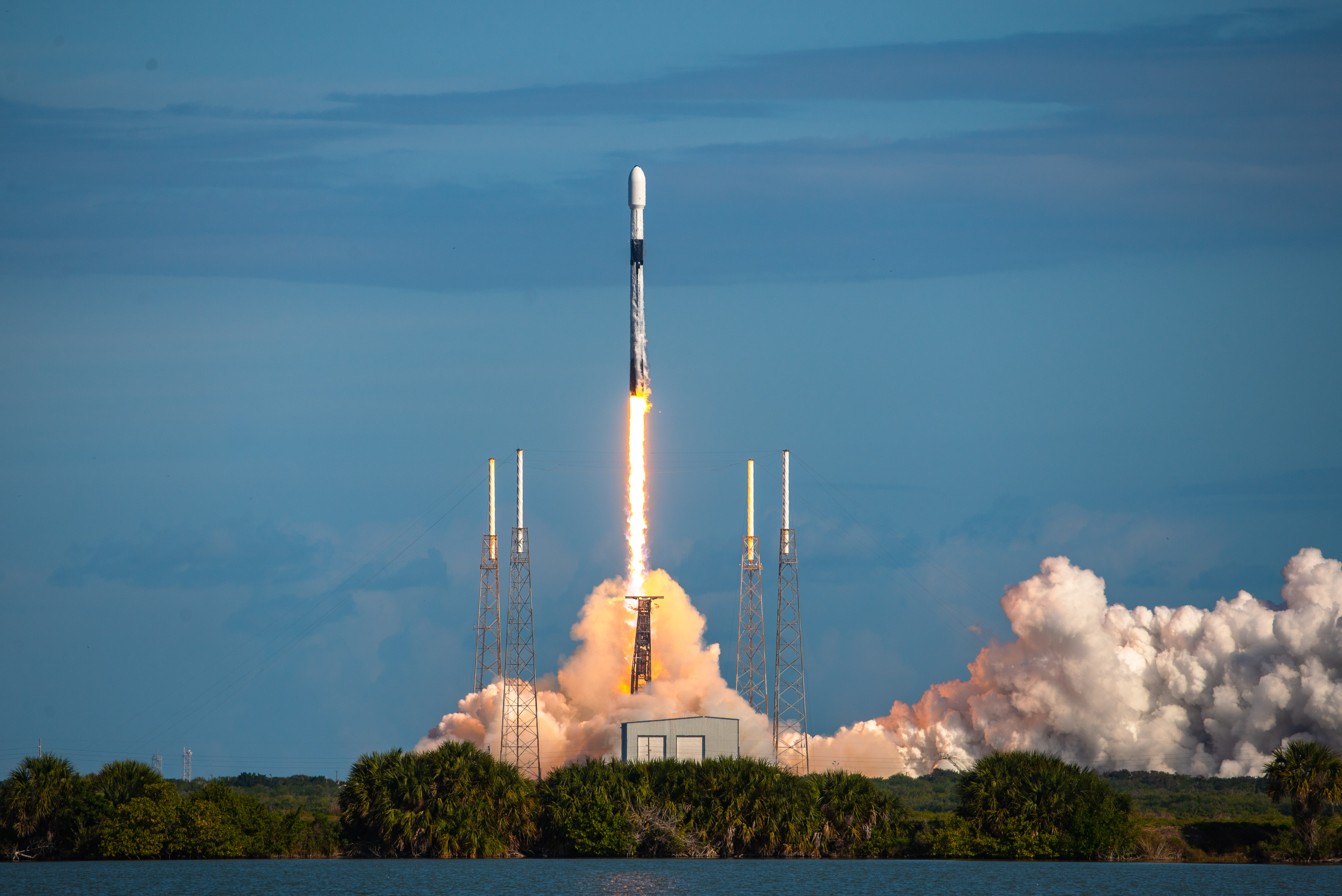
Launch of Transporter-3

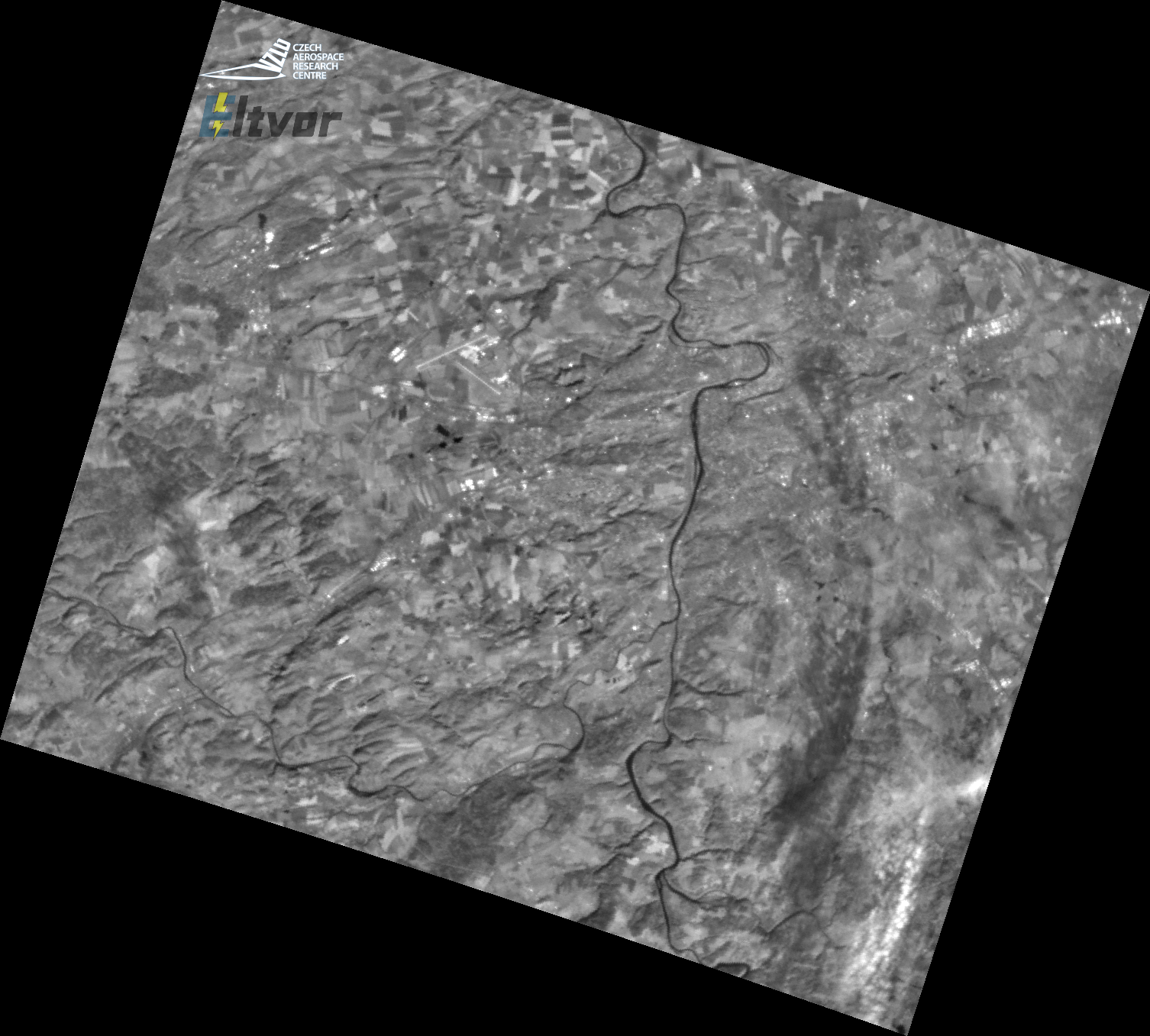
Photo of Prague taken by VZLUSAT-2 on 10 October 2022

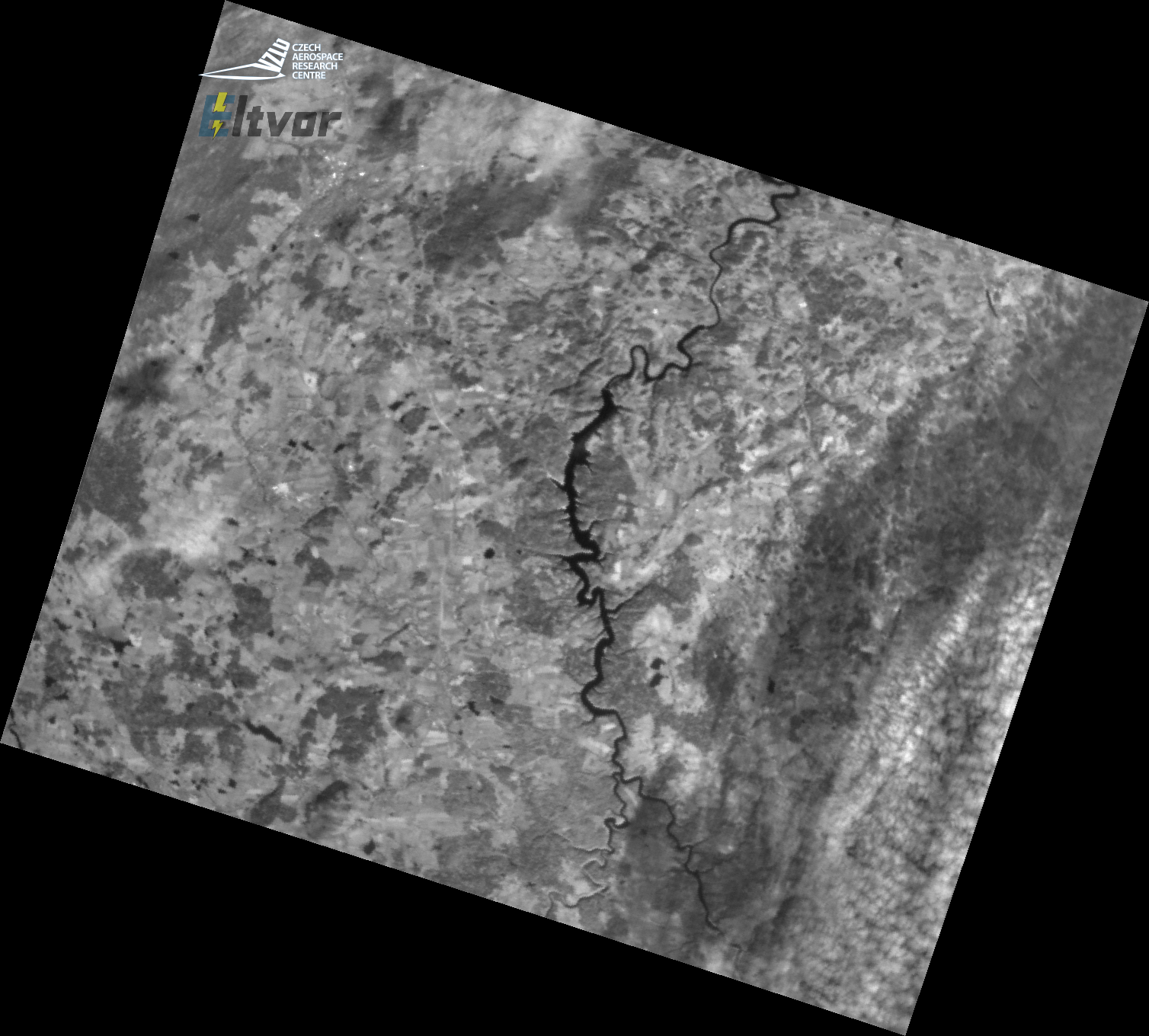
Photo of Orlík Reservoir taken by VZLUSAT-2 on 10 October 2022
