= Tom & Jerry (space mission) =

European technology demonstration satellite mission

- Mission type: Technology demonstration
- Operator: European Union; European Space Agency (France) Infinite Orbits

Spacecraft properties
- Manufacturer: (United Kingdom) Open Cosmos

Start of mission
- Launch date: 2027 (planned)
- Rocket: Spectrum
- Launch site: (Norway) Andøya Space
- Contractor: (Germany) Isar Aerospace

Tom & Jerry is a technology demonstration satellite mission under development by the French company Infinite Orbits with the support of the Flight Ticket Initiative, a collaboration between EU and the European Space Agency (ESA). The two small satellites will be launched together on a single flight of the Spectrum rocket into low Earth orbit, where they will perform a series of proximity operations maneuvres designed to demonstrate capabilities needed for future on-orbit satellite servicing, satellite inspection, space situational awareness, and space debris cleanup applications. The satellites will be designed and constructed by Open Cosmos. The mission is expected to launch in 2027.

== See also ==
- E.Inspector – European technology demonstration cubesat
- PRELUDE – European technology demonstration satellites
- ClearSpace-1 – Planned European mission to demonstrate space debris removal
- VZLUGEM – Czech space mission for demonstrating proximity operations
- List of European Space Agency programmes and missions
