= VZLU TOM-8 =

Czechoslovak training aircraft

TOM-8
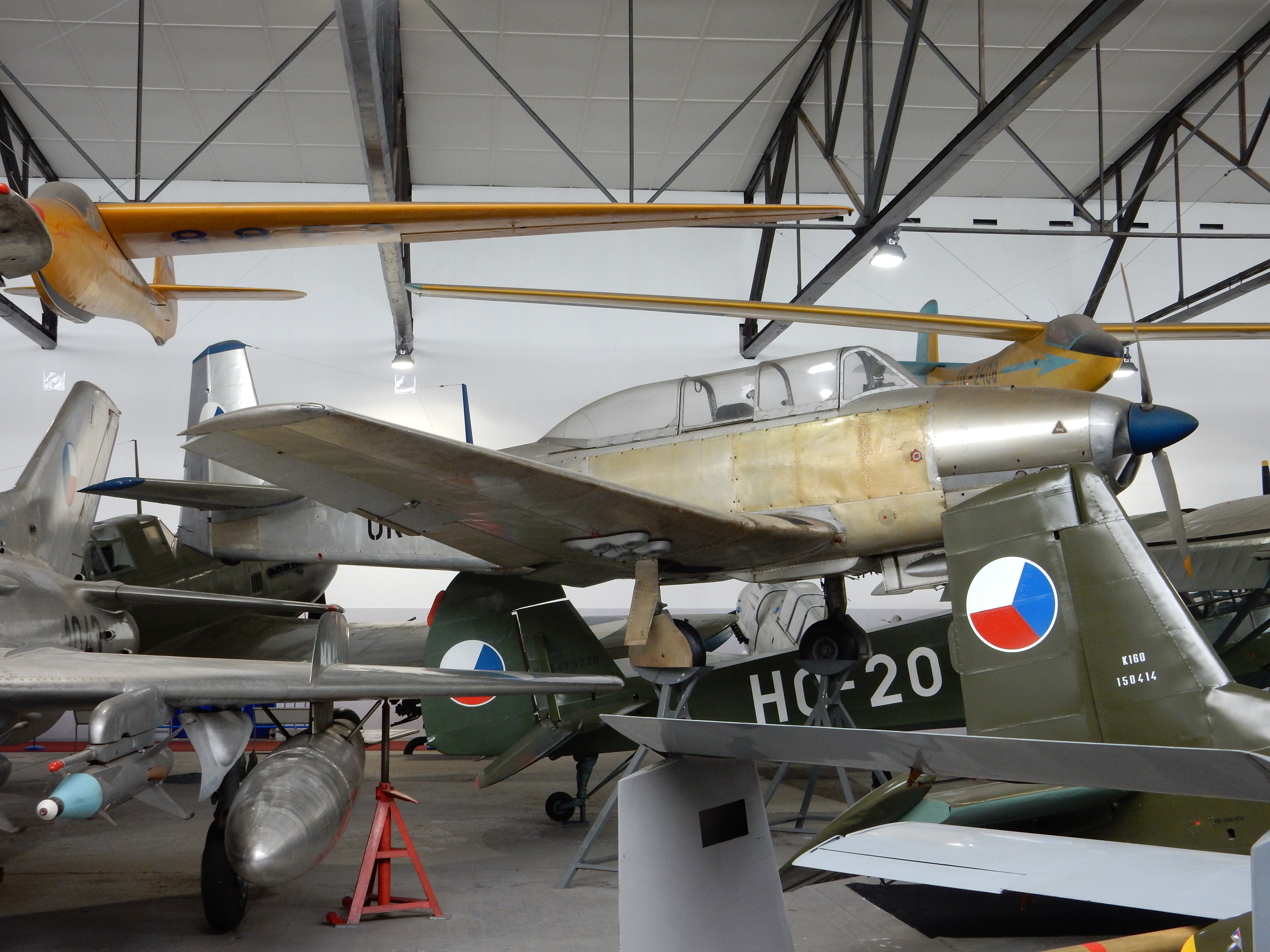

General information
- Type: Training aircraft
- National origin: Czechoslovakia
- Manufacturer: VZLU
- Status: Prototype

History
- First flight: 23 April 1956

The TOM-8 was a prototype Czechoslovak single-engined two-seat training aircraft of the 1950s. It was designed by the VZLU, the Czechoslovak national aeronautic research institute for the Czechoslovak Air Force, with a prototype flying in 1956, but production plans were abandoned in 1960.

== Design and development ==
In the mid-1950s, the Czechoslovak Air Force had a requirement to replace its Aero C-11 trainers, a licence-built version of the Soviet Yakovlev Yak-11. The design of the new aircraft was allocated to a team at the VZLU, (Note: Czech:Vyzkummy a Zkusebni Letecky Ustav, the Czechoslovak national aeronautic research institute.) led by Karel Tomáš, who had previously served as chief designer for Tatra's aviation department, and later for Zlín, where he designed the Zlín Z 26 trainer.

The resulting design, designated TOM-8 after Tomáš, and also known as the L-8, was a low-winged monoplane of all metal construction, (Note: The first prototype had a steel tube structure, but it was planned for later aircraft to have a monocoque fuselage.) powered by a single 235 hp (175 kW) Praga Doris C air-cooled six-cylinder horizontally-opposed piston engine. Student and instructor sat in tandem in an enclosed cockpit, with the student in the front seat, and were provided with dual controls. The aircraft had a retractable tricycle landing gear.

The first TOM-8 made its maiden flight on 23 April 1956, but development was slowed by engine problems, and plans for production at the Moravan Otrokovice works (where Zlín aircraft were built) were abandoned in 1960.

One TOM-8 is preserved at the Kbely Aviation Museum.

== Specifications ==
Data from Jane's All the World's Aircraft 1958–59

General characteristics

- Crew: 2
- Length: 9.37 m (30 ft 9 in)
- Wingspan: 10.93 m (35 ft 10 in)
- Height: 3.17 m (10 ft 5 in)
- Wing area: 17.255 m^{2} (185.73 sq ft)
- Aspect ratio: 6.94:1
- Empty weight: 1,060 kg (2,337 lb)
- Gross weight: 1,380 kg (3,042 lb) (normal)
- Fuel capacity: 180 L (40 imp gal; 48 US gal)
- Powerplant: 1 × Praga Doris C air-cooled six-cylinder horizontally opposed piston engine, 175 kW (235 hp)
- Propellers: 2-bladed metal variable-pitch propeller, 2.4 m (7 ft 10 in) diameter

Performance

- Maximum speed: 285 km/h (177 mph, 154 kn)
- Cruise speed: 240 km/h (150 mph, 130 kn) at 1,000 m (3,280 ft)
- Range: 720 km (450 mi, 390 nmi)
- Endurance: 3 hr
- Service ceiling: 6,050 m (19,850 ft)
- Rate of climb: 5.41 m/s (1,065 ft/min)
- Take-off distance to 20 m (65 ft): 455 m (1,493 ft)
- Landing distance from 20 m (65 ft): 430 m (1,410 ft)
