= China Siwei =

Chinese civilian remote-sensing constellation

China Siwei Surveying and Mapping Technology Co. Ltd. (China Siwei) is a subsidiary of the China Aerospace Science and Technology Corporation (CASC), is a leading operator of Earth observation satellites in China. The company is specialized in providing Earth Observation data through its advance satellite constellation named Gaojing (SuperView) and Siwei Gaojing (SuperView Neo) Series. The satellites are designed for high-resolution imaging for various applications. Siwei Gaojing constellation is a key component of Chinese commercial and civilian remote sensing capabilities, aiming to complete with global leaders, such as Maxar and Airbus.

== Overview ==
China Siwei operates 14 satellites under Gaojing and Siewi Gaojing constellation and planned to add 18 more satellites into its constellation. The Constellation is divided into three series: SuperView Neo-1, SuperView Neo-2 and SuperView Neo-3.

== Launches ==
Name	SATCAT	Launch date (UTC)	Launch vehicle	Launch site	Orbital apsis	Inclination	Period (min)	Status
Gaojing-1 01 (SuperView-1 01)	41907	28 December 2016	Long March 2D	Taiyuan, LC-9				Operational
Gaojing-1 02 (SuperView-1 02)	41908	28 December 2016	Long March 2D	Taiyuan, LC-9				Operational
Gaojing-1 03 (SuperView-1 03)	43099	9 January 2018	Long March 2D	Taiyuan, LC-9				Operational
Gaojing-1 04 (SuperView-1 04)	43100	9 January 2018	Long March 2D	Taiyuan, LC-9				Operational
Siwei Gaojing-1 01 (SuperView Neo-1 01)	52320	29 April 2022	Long March 2C	Jiuquan, SLS-2				Operational
Siwei Gaojing-1 02 (SuperView Neo-1 02)	52322	29 April 2022	Long March 2C	Jiuquan, SLS-2				Operational
Siwei Gaojing-2 01 (SuperView Neo-2 01)	53128	15 July 2022	Long March 2C	Taiyuan, LC-9				Operational
Siwei Gaojing-2 02 (SuperView Neo-2 02)	53130	15 July 2022	Long March 2C	Taiyuan, LC-9				Operational
Siwei Gaojing-3 01 (SuperView Neo-3 01)	59510	15 April 2024	Long March 2D	Jiuquan, SLS-2				Operational
Siwei Gaojing-2 03 (SuperView Neo-2 03)	62079	24 November 2024	Long March 2C	Jiuquan, SLS-2				Operational
Siwei Gaojing-2 04 (SuperView Neo-2 04)	62080	24 November 2024	Long March 2C	Jiuquan, SLS-2				Operational
Siwei Gaojing-1 03 (SuperView Neo-1 03)	63125	27 February 2025	Long March 2C	Jiuquan, SLS-2				Operational
Siwei Gaojing-1 04 (SuperView Neo-1 04)	63126	27 February 2025	Long March 2C	Jiuquan, SLS-2				Operational
Siwei Gaojing-3 02 (SuperView Neo-3 02)	63208	15 February 2025	Long March 2D	Jiuquan, SLS-2				Operational

== Challenges and development ==
The SuperView-1 01 and 02 launch faced challenges due to an incorrect orbital insertion, requiring significant propellant use to correct its position and become operational, potentially shortening the satellites' operational lifespan. Despite this, the constellation has grown steadily, with successful launch in subsequent years. The introduction of autonomous "Self-driving" satellite in 2024 marks a significant technology advancement.

== See also ==
- China High-resolution Earth Observation System (CHEOS) - Broader framework for Chinese remote sensing satellites
- Gaofen - Chinese State-Owned High-resolution Earth Observation Program.
- Jilin-1 - Another Chinese Commercial Satellite Constellation for Earth Observation
