= Very low Earth orbit =

Range of low orbital altitudes

Very low Earth orbit (VLEO) is a range of geocentric orbits with lowest altitudes (at perigee) below 400 km (250 mi). It is of increasing commercial importance in a variety of scenarios and for multiple applications, in both private and government satellite operations. Applications include Earth observation (especially gravity and magnetic fields), telecommunications, and rural internet access among others.

Spacecraft may be put into a highly elliptical orbit around Earth with a perigee as low as 80 to 90 km (50 to 56 mi), surviving for multiple orbits. Sub-orbital flight and near space is sometimes considered to be the case up until 160 km of altitude above Earth.

== Interest ==
In the Eighties, space agencies started showing interest in VLEO satellites, leading to the European Space Agency's Earth observation satellite "Gravity Field and Steady-State Ocean Circulation Explore" (GOCE), designed to take accurate measurements of Earth's gravitational field. It demonstrated a sustained and precisely controlled orbit at between 224 and 300 km (139 and 186 mi) for almost four years from 2009 to 2013.

The Chinese Space Agency launched the Tiangong-1 prototype space station into VLEO in 2011, orbiting at an average of 355 km (221 mi), and the Tiangong-2 prototype in 2016, both of which have since deorbited. The Tiangong space station, launched in 2021 (permanently crewed since 2022), operates at a distance of roughly 350–450 km (220–280 mi).

The Japanese Space Agency, JAXA, launched its Super Low Altitude Test Satellite, or SLATS (“Tsubame”), in 2017, whose orbit slowly decreased from an initial altitude of 630 km (390 mi) to operate at seven different altitudes, from 271 km (168 mi) to a final altitude of 167.4 km (104.0 mi).

In 2016, Skeyeon filed a VLEO satellite patent describing commercial satellite operation in orbits from 100 to 350 km (62 to 217 mi). Companies such as Albedo Space, EOI Space, Thales Alenia Space and others have also announced plans.

In June 2021, the “1st International Symposium on VLEO Missions and Technologies”, registered almost 200 attendees from industry, academia, space agencies and government. In April 2022 DARPA issued a proposal to study VLEO for HF transmissions, and in December 2022 the benefits of VLEO are mentioned as a possibility for future 6G communication technology, using a constellation of small satellites in VLEO.

Project 200 by Bellatrix Aerospace aims to build an Ultra-Low Orbit satellite that will orbit at a height of less than 200 kilometers. By 2026, it hopes to launch its first satellite.

== Benefits ==
The benefits of satellites operating in VLEO are manifold, including: ability to sense variations of the gravitational and magnetic fields of the Earth at high spatial resolution; substantially lower launch and operating costs; communication payloads with significantly better link budgets; and creating self-cleaning orbits, essentially solving the significant problem of space debris. Earth observation at ultra-high resolution is a potential benefit too, but it has to be traded off with a much reduced field of view or swath and a reduced capacity to image the desired targets compared to satellites in higher orbits. Hypothetically, the thin air can also be harvested as propellant to counteract atmospheric drag of the lower orbit.

=== Link budget ===
Roughly defined as a measurement of all power gains and losses in a communication system. With satellites, the process of transmitting from the Earth to the satellite is known as the uplink, and from the satellite to the Earth as the downlink. The difference between the power sent at one end and received at the other end is known as transmission loss. Since the power density of the radio waves decreases with the square of distance between the transmitter and receiver, primarily due to spreading of the electromagnetic energy in space according to the inverse square law, the closer the satellite is to Earth, the less power required to get a signal to either Earth or satellite, and the better the link budget. This improved link budget can be used for either lower power at the same data rate, higher data rate at the same power, or a combination of both. Smaller and/or more powerful transmitters can be either ground based, satellite based, or both.

=== Self-cleaning orbits ===
If VLEO orbits are sufficiently low, they are essentially self-cleaning, solving the significant problem of space debris. Because atmospheric drag is greater in VLEO than in higher orbits, vehicles in VLEO will remain there until either their propulsion runs out, or they are resupplied with fuel. Once propulsion ends, vehicles made with demisable materials will burn up on reentry, while in general satellites with non-demisable units will partly burn up and break up, potentially creating hazards to the Earth' inhabitants below, although at present (2026) the casualty risk due to meteoroids and similar natural falling bodies remains larger.

== Challenges ==
There are several challenges for keeping satellites operating in VLEO that higher orbits do not have. Orbits below about 450 km (280 mi) require the use of novel technologies for satellites to operate in, such as frequent bursts of propulsion, or even continuous propulsion (e.g., GOCE), to counteract the atmospheric drag.

=== Fuel consumption ===
Air drag and therefore fuel consumption increase exponentially the closer to Earth the orbit is. The International Space Station (ISS) originally orbited at an average of 350 km (220 mi) from Earth, but was boosted to an average of 400 km (250 mi) in 2011. This allowed the ISS to go from an average fuel use of 8,600 kg per year to 3,600 kg per year. The ISS now requires re-boosting only a few times a year due to orbital decay.

=== Atmospheric drag ===
There is the residual atmosphere in VLEO creating significant drag on satellites planning to maintain orbit. Unlike the ISS on the border of VLEO/LEO orbits that is resupplied with fuel to counteract drag, once most larger LEO and GEO spacecraft achieve orbit, they require little or no propulsion to maintain orbit. Smaller satellites such as micro and nano satellites are not built for fuel resupply, and must carry their own, or develop it from available resources. To this end a number of companies and governments are developing engines utilizing different concepts for propulsion in VLEO. The companies NewOrbit Space and Kreios Space are developing air breathing propulsion systems for VLEO satellites. In particular, NewOrbit Space was able to operate and neutralize an ion engine entirely on air in a vacuum chamber — an industry first. The company's initial results show a specific impulse of 6380 seconds, accelerating incoming air to over 200,000 km/h. This means that the air breathing electric propulsion system can produce enough thrust to counteract drag in the upper atmosphere, allowing spacecraft to operate sustainably in VLEO below 200 km. Skeyeon has a patent on an propulsion system using a self-sustaining ion engine. The drag of the residual atmosphere also calls for improved aerodynamic spacecraft design, like in GOCE. Current designs of a large square object in orbit with huge solar panels attached, characteristics of many higher altitude orbital space craft, will not function in VLEO.

=== Exposure to oxygen ===
Additionally, satellites in VLEO are exposed to very high levels of elemental oxygen, also known as atomic oxygen (AO), a highly reactive form of oxygen that corrodes most substances quickly. This requires the use of special coatings to protect objects and equipment in this orbit. In VLEO orbit, estimates are that up to 96% of the atmosphere is AO. At VLEO altitudes, the total amount of O atoms rises exponentially the lower the altitude, and is orders of magnitude greater than that encountered by the ISS at 400 km altitude. Any vehicle spending more than a month in a VLEO orbit will require special coatings and protection, or corrode quickly. Materials have been developed for VLEO use that simultaneously provides two key benefits: protection from AO damage, and an atomically smooth outer surface that scatters AO atoms elastically, resulting in half the drag of traditional materials that promote diffuse scattering of incident oxygen and other atoms. Such materials can extend the lifetime of a VLEO satellite by reducing corrosion and (moderately) reducing drag.

== Deorbiting requirements ==
Due to plans by several companies to create large satellite constellations, some with over 10,000 satellites, on September 29, 2022, the Federal Communications Commission (FCC) adopted a new rule. New satellites placed in orbit must either deorbit or be placed in a graveyard orbit five years after mission life, reduced from a previously generally accepted 25 years after mission life. This applies to US-licensed satellites as well as those from other countries that seek to access the US market. Satellite owners are now required to submit deorbit plans with their launch proposals, to help eliminate additional space junk. This most likely will include reserving propellant to initiate deorbit, increasing either launch costs to carry more fuel, or decreasing mission life.

Satellites in VLEO will also require deorbiting plans when a mission is completed. However, due to the atmospheric drag in VLEO being orders of magnitude higher, the satellites attitude control system that normally ensures that the vehicle's roll, pitch, and yaw directions are maintained, can be instructed to rotate the satellite to its highest surface area facing forward. This will be maintained until the torques from air drag prevail, after which the satellite will tumble (the normal condition for re-entering satellites). Smaller vehicle design, with a low drag configuration during operation and a high drag configuration after mission completion, can potentially be an optimal vehicle choice for VLEO orbits, and take advantage of the inherent self-cleaning properties of atmospheric drag on re-entry.
