= Geespace =

Satellite technology company

- Native name: 浙江时空道宇科技有限公司
- Romanized name: Zhejiang Shikong Daoyu Technology Co., Ltd.
- Company type: Subsidiary
- Industry: Aerospace; Information technology
- Founded: 2018; 8 years ago
- Headquarters: Shanghai, China
- Area served: Greater China
- Key people: Li Shufu (Chairman of the Board); Dr. Wang Yang (CEO)
- Parent: Geely Holding
- Website: www.geespace.com

Geespace is a satellite technology company established in 2018 by Zhejiang Geely Holding Group as part of its Geely Technology Group division. The company focuses on developing, launching, and operating low-orbit satellites to provide high-precision positioning and connectivity services.

== History ==
Geespace was founded in 2018 to support Geely Holding's entry into the aerospace industry. The company planned its first satellite launch for the second half of 2020, aiming to deploy satellites that would provide centimeter-accurate positioning services and support its OmniCloud platform.

In June 2022, Geespace launched its first nine satellites, followed by another 11 satellites in February 2024, and an additional 10 in September 2024. These satellites are part of the Geely Future Mobility Constellation, which is expected to consist of 240 satellites to provide precise positioning and connectivity support.

== Technology and services ==
Geespace's satellites are designed to be modular, high-resilience, high-performance, and mass-produced. They are intended to support various applications, including high-precision positioning, logistics, maritime monitoring, remote sensing, and satellite communication services.

The company's OmniCloud platform is a satellite-based AI cloud service that aims to offer high-precision positioning data for vehicles, public transportation fleet management, ride-hailing, and ride-sharing management. The platform's goal is to improve urban traffic management efficiency and support highly autonomous driving by enabling AI decision-making through connected infrastructure and vehicles.

== Satellite constellation ==
The Geely Future Mobility Constellation, which includes Geespace's satellites, is planned to consist of 240 satellites. The first phase will include 72 satellites, expected to be fully deployed by 2025, to enable global real-time data communication services. An additional 168 satellites are scheduled for launch in the second phase to provide centimeter-level, high-precision positioning services for autonomous driving, smart connectivity, and consumer electronics sectors.

Geespace initially focuses on serving the Chinese and Asia-Pacific markets, with plans for global expansion after 2026. The company's satellites are expected to be used by Geely's automotive partners, such as its premium electric vehicle brand, Zeekr, to enhance their autonomous driving capabilities.
