= Albedo Space =

American aerospace manufacturing company

Albedo
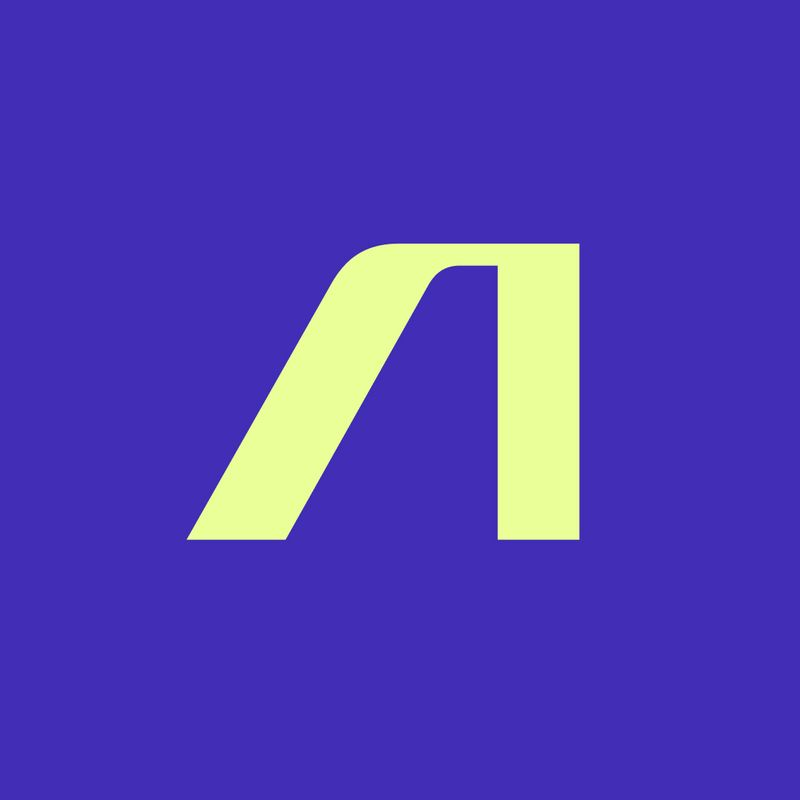
- Type: Private
- Industry: Space; Aerospace manufacturing
- Founded: 2020
- Headquarters: Broomfield, Colorado
- Key people: Topher Haddad (CEO); AyJay Lasater (CTO)
- Number of employees: 40-50
- Website: albedo.com

Albedo Space is an American aerospace manufacturing company founded in 2020 by Topher Haddad, AyJay Lasater, and Winston Tri. The company develops and manufactures Very Low Earth Orbit (VLEO) satellites for defense, earth observation, and other payload operators. Originally focused on commercial satellite imagery, Albedo was inspired by the potential of high-resolution satellite imagery after Haddad read about a classified U.S. spy satellite image with 10 cm resolution shared by then-President Donald Trump.

Albedo's headquarters are located in Broomfield, Colorado. The company has raised approximately $140 million in funding and employs around 50 people.

Albedo expanded its business model in October 2025 to concentrate on VLEO satellite sales after successfully demonstrating their better than expected hardware capabilities with the Clarity-1 satellite. The company identified stronger market demand in defense and multi-orbit constellation applications. The company aims to produce hundreds of satellites annually and claims to be "the only company with a VLEO bus on the market that also is flight proven."

The company launched its first satellite in March 2025.

== History ==
=== Key Developments ===
- 2021: Albedo was founded through Y Combinator and raised $10 million in seed funding led by Initialized Capital. It received a NOAA license to acquire commercial imagery with resolutions of 10 cm panchromatic and 40 cm multispectral.
- 2022: Completed baseline satellite architecture and raised $48 million in Series A funding, bringing the total raised to $58 Million since founding.
- 2023: Finalized satellite design, established its manufacturing facility, and began building first satellite; Clarity-1.
- 2024: Raised $35 million in Series A-1 funding, accelerating the integration and testing of VLEO satellite hardware.
- 2025 (March): Successfully launched first satellite; Clarity-1 aboard SpaceX's Transporter-13 rideshare mission.
- 2025 (October): Albedo announced a strategic pivot from commercial satellite imagery to developing VLEO satellite buses for other payload operators.

== Customers and Applications ==
=== VLEO Platform Customers ===
Following its October 2025 pivot, Albedo focuses on providing VLEO satellite buses to defense, communications, and other payload operators requiring platforms capable of operating at very low altitudes. The company's flight-proven hardware from Clarity-1 demonstrated capability to operate 12% better than design specifications.

=== Government & Intelligence ===
Albedo has secured several contracts within the U.S. government.

- A $12 million Strategic Funding Increase (STRATFI) contract from the Air Force Research Laboratory (AFRL).
- Partnerships with the National Reconnaissance Office (NRO) and National Air and Space Intelligence Center leverage Albedo's thermal infrared capabilities for nighttime intelligence applications.

== Satellites ==
=== Clarity-1 ===
Albedo launched their first satellite, Clarity-1, in March 2025. It had a mass of 580 kg and operated at an altitude 320 km. Clarity-1 operated for approximately nine months before communications was lost, and served as a demonstration platform for the company's very low Earth orbit (VLEO) capabilities. Without the ability to thrust, the satellite gradually decayed through VLEO for the following six months, and reentered the atmosphere on 10 June, 2026. The satellite's performance exceeded expectations by 12%, leading to Albedo's strategic focus on manufacturing VLEO satellites for other operators rather than selling imagery data themselves.

Clarity-1 has panchromatic camera with a resolution of 10 cm per pixel, plus multispectrum near-infrared (770–895 nm) at 40 cm, and an infrared (7.5–13.5 μm) camera with 2 m resolution.

Clarity-1 reentered Earth's atmosphere on 10 June 2026, with The Aerospace Corporation's Center for Orbital and Reentry Debris Studies predicting reentry at approximately 08:41 UTC. The reentry produced a fireball visible across California and Nevada at about 01:41 PDT; the American Meteor Society received 91 witness reports of the event and confirmed it was the Clarity-1 reentry rather than a natural meteor. Albedo CEO Topher Haddad said the reentry was planned and expected, and that the fireball was very likely Clarity-1 based on independent observations and the predicted reentry location.
