= VZLU Aerospace =

Czech aerospace company

VZLU Aerospace a.s.
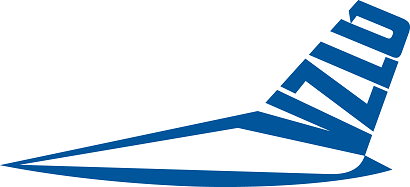
- Formerly: Výzkumný a zkušební letecký ústav
- Type: Joint-stock company
- Industry: Aerospace
- Founded: 1922
- Headquarters: Prague, Czech Republic
- Services: Aerospace research, development and testing
- Owner: Czech Republic, through the Ministry of Finance (100%)
- Website: www.vzlu.cz/en/

VZLU Aerospace a.s. is an aerospace research and testing company based in Prague. It serves as the Czech national centre for aerospace research, development and testing. The company is owned by the Czech state through the Ministry of Finance. Founded in 1922, the institute became a joint-stock company in 1991. It was known as Výzkumný a zkušební letecký ústav (Aeronautical Research and Test Institute) until January 2025.

VZLU’s work on aircraft such as the L-29 Delfín, L-39 Albatros and Let L-410 has included research, development and testing. Its facilities include wind tunnels and laboratories for testing aircraft structures, materials and engines. VZLU’s space work began in 2005. It developed the satellites VZLUSAT-1, VZLUSAT-2 and SATurnin-1, built accelerometers for ESA’s Swarm mission and carried out tests for the Ariane 6 launcher.

== Research and testing ==
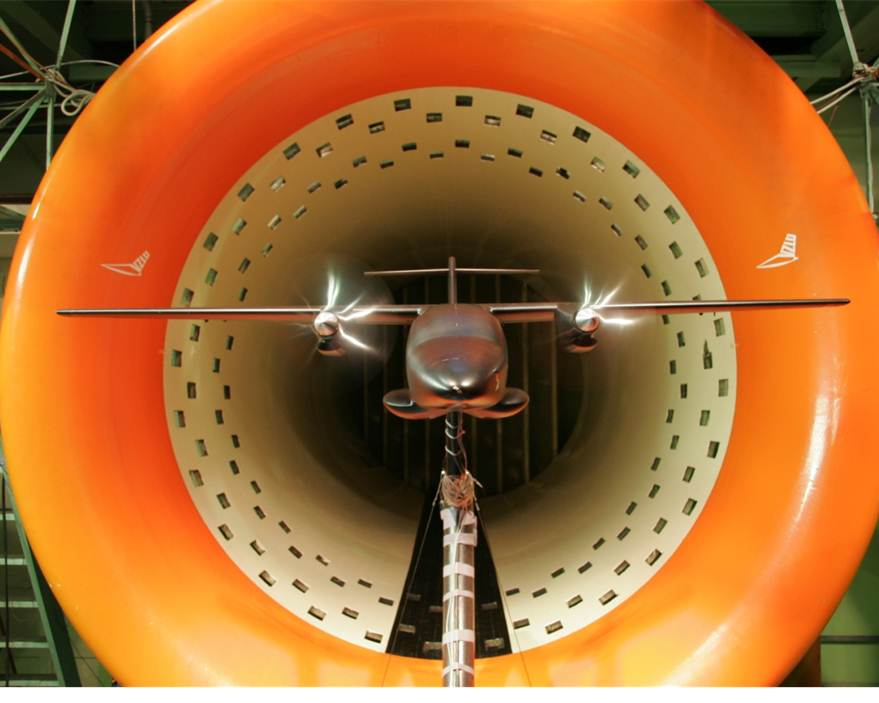
Wind tunnel at VZLU

VZLU Aerospace conducts research in aerodynamics, aircraft structures, composite materials and turbine-engine technologies. Its facilities include high- and low-speed wind tunnels, materials and engine laboratories, and equipment for static strength and fatigue testing of complete aircraft.

In 2020, VZLU conducted static structural testing of the L-39NG airframe and low-speed wind-tunnel tests for its light-attack configuration. Its high-speed aerodynamics facility in Prague’s Libeň district uses a former spherical gas holder as a vacuum reservoir connected to a wind tunnel. The facility has tested models of aircraft including the L-29 and L-39, as well as components for turbine manufacturers.

For the European OFELIA programme, VZLU develops a flexible wing-and-propulsion model for wind-tunnel testing. The tests investigate whirl flutter and provide measurements for validating computer models.

== History ==
The institute dates to 1922, when it was established at the initiative of the Czechoslovak Ministry of National Defence. Its original departments included aerodynamics, airframes and propulsion, electrical and radio equipment, and photographic optics. By the late 1920s, it was using wind tunnels to test aircraft models for domestic manufacturers.

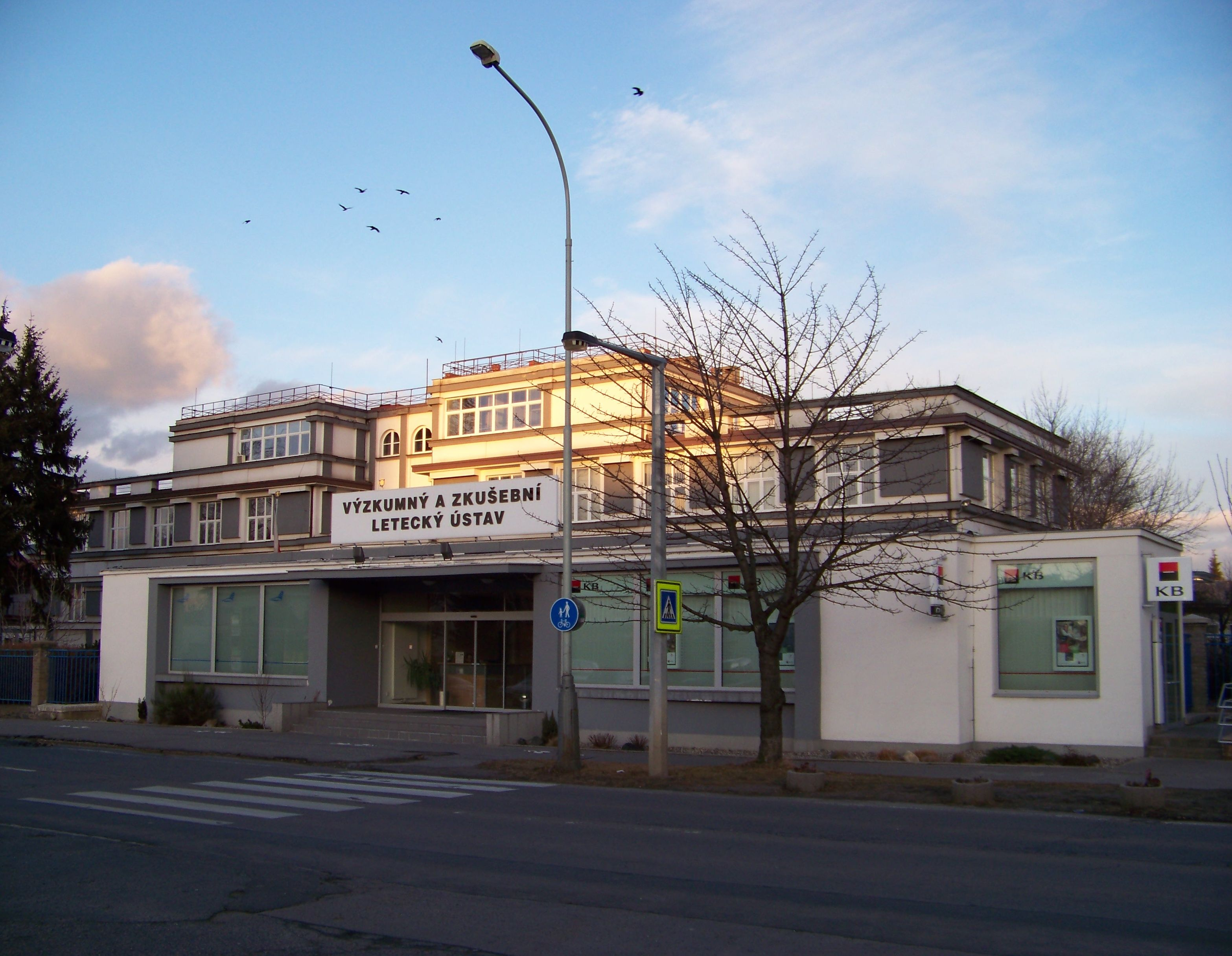
Main entrance

Work on the L-29 Delfín began at VZLÚ in 1955, with initial studies by Zdeněk Rublič and Karel Tomáš. In 1956, the project became a state assignment to the institute, where the prototypes were subsequently built. The first flight took place on 5 April 1959. Following comparative trials in the Soviet Union in 1961, the L-29 was recommended as the standard jet trainer for Warsaw Pact countries. Series production took place at Aero Vodochody and Let Kunovice.

The institute became a joint-stock company in 1991. From 2006 to 2010, it coordinated CESAR (Cost Effective Small AiRcraft), a European research programme covering aircraft design, propulsion integration and aircraft systems. On 1 January 2025, Výzkumný a zkušební letecký ústav was renamed VZLU Aerospace.

== Space activities ==
VZLU developed VZLUSAT-1 and VZLUSAT-2 to test spacecraft technologies. It also built the Earth-observation satellite SATurnin-1 for the Czech Ministry of Defence. The satellite carries a telescope for Earth observation. It was integrated in Prague-Letňany and launched in January 2025. Its telescope captures images for defence and security applications.

ESA’s Swarm satellites carry accelerometers designed and manufactured by VZLU to measure non-gravitational acceleration. VZLU and its subsidiary Serenum developed the motorised protective door for Proba-3’s ASPIICS coronagraph. Its work on Ariane 6 involved structural testing of the rear skirt of the rocket’s solid-propellant boosters.

Its projects under development include AMBIC, an Earth-observation satellite intended for Czech government users, and QUVIK, an ultraviolet space telescope. VZLU leads the AMBIC project and is responsible for integrating and operating the satellite. VZLU is the prime contractor for the QUVIK spacecraft. Masaryk University leads the mission’s scientific programme.

== Aircraft and spacecraft developed by VZLU ==
=== Aircraft ===
- VZLU TOM-8 – prototype training aircraft; first flown in 1956
- Aero L-29 Delfín – jet trainer; first flown in 1959
- VZLÚ HC-3 – prototype helicopter; first flown in 1960

=== Spacecraft ===
- VZLUSAT-1 – technology-demonstration satellite launched in 2017
- VZLUSAT-2 – technology-demonstration satellite launched in 2022
- SATurnin-1 – Earth-observation satellite launched in 2025

Projects under development:

- VZLUGEM – a two-satellite mission
- QUVIK – an ultraviolet space telescope
- AMBIC – an Earth-observation satellite for Czech government users

== See also ==
- List of Czech satellites
- Spacemanic – Czech aerospace company
