= PRSC-EO3 =

High-resolution optical Earth observation satellite for Pakistan launched in 2026

- Manufacturer: Pakistan Space and Upper Atmosphere Research Commission (SUPARCO)
- Country of origin: Pakistan
- Operator: SUPARCO
- Applications: High-resolution optical remote sensing

Specifications
- Equipment: High-resolution optical payload
- Regime: LEO

Production
- Status: Operational
- Launched: 1
- Operational: 1
- Maiden launch: 25 April 2026

PRSC-EO3 is a high-resolution optical Earth observation satellite for the Pakistan Space and Upper Atmosphere Research Commission (SUPARCO). The satellite was equipped with a high-resolution optical payload and uses propulsion systems provided by the Beijing Institute of Control Engineering (BICE) under China Academy of Space Technology (CAST). It was launched into a Low Earth Orbit on 25 April 2026 at 12:15 UTC.

== Satellite ==
PRSC-EO3 is a high-resolution optical imagery satellite that requires sunlight to capture images of the ground. The satellite operates in an unusual 38-degree inclined orbit around Earth, which is different from typical optical imagery satellites that use sun-synchronous inclination of nearly 90 degrees.

== Launch ==
The satellite was launched on Saturday, April 25, 2026 at 8:15 a.m. Eastern (1215 UTC) from LC-16 at Taiyuan Satellite Launch Center, northern China. The launch vehicle was a Long March 6 rocket operated by CASC (China Aerospace Science and Technology Corporation). The launch mission was successful, with the satellite successfully deployed into Low Earth Orbit.

The launch was facilitated by China Great Wall Industry Corporation (CGWIC), a subsidiary of the China Aerospace Science and Technology Corporation (CASC), as part of a multi-launch service agreement with SUPARCO. China launched the PRSC-EO1 and PRSC-EO2 remote sensing satellites for Pakistan in January 2025 and February 2026 respectively.

This was the 15th launch of the Long March 6, which had its debut flight in 2015, marking the debut of China's new generation of kerosene-liquid oxygen launch vehicles, developed in parallel with the Long March 5 and 7 series. The mission was the 97th orbital launch attempt of 2026.

The mission cost $19 million.

== Orbit ==
PRSC-EO3 operates in Low Earth Orbit (LEO) at an altitude of 500 km. Unlike typical optical Earth-observation satellites that operate in sun-synchronous orbits, PRSC-EO3 operates in an inclined orbit of 38 degrees.

== Constellation ==
PRSC-EO3 is part of Pakistan's seven-satellite constellation comprising PRSC EO1, PRSC EO2, PRSC EO3, PRSC HS-1, PRSS-1, and PakTes-1a.

== Purpose ==
The satellite is designed for remote sensing and ISR (Intelligence, Surveillance and Reconnaissance), including imagery intelligence (IMINT), providing nearly real-time intelligence on activities in India.

== China–Pakistan Cooperation ==
The mission is indicative of deepening China–Pakistan space cooperation. Pakistan is participating in China's moon exploration plans, including signing up to the International Lunar Research Station (ILRS) moon base project in October 2023, and an agreement which will see one Pakistani astronaut make a short term visit to the Tiangong space station.
