= List of spaceflight launches in July–September 2025 =

This article lists orbital and suborbital launches planned for the third quarter of the year 2025, including launches planned for the third quarter of 2025 without a specific launch date.

For all other spaceflight activities, see 2025 in spaceflight. For other launches in 2025, see List of spaceflight launches in January–March 2025, List of spaceflight launches in April–June 2025, or List of spaceflight launches in October–December 2025.

== Orbital launches ==
- ← Jan
- Feb
- Mar
- Apr
- May
- Jun
- Jul
- Aug
- Sep
- Oct
- Nov
- Dec →

=== July ===
Date and time (UTC)	Rocket	Flight number	Launch site		LSP	
Date and time (UTC)	Payload (⚀ = CubeSat)	Operator	Orbit	Function	Decay (UTC)	Outcome
Date and time (UTC)	Remarks					
1 July; 21:04	(United States) Falcon 9 Block 5	F9-499	(United States) Kennedy LC-39A		(United States) SpaceX	
1 July; 21:04	MTG-S1/Sentinel-4A (Meteosat-13)	EUMETSAT / ESA	Geosynchronous	Meteorology / Earth observation	In orbit	Operational
1 July; 21:04	MTG-S1 hosts Sentinel-4 instruments. The mission was switched from Ariane 6 to Falcon 9 in mid-2024.					
2 July; 04:25	(United States) Falcon 9 Block 5	Starlink Group 10-25	(United States) Cape Canaveral SLC-40		(United States) SpaceX	
2 July; 04:25	(United States) Starlink × 27	SpaceX	Low Earth	Communications	In orbit	Operational
2 July; 04:25	500th launch of Falcon 9. This Falcon 9 First Stage Booster (B1067) became the first booster to reach 29 launches.					
3 July; 09:35	(China) Long March 4C	4C-Y63	(China) Xichang LC-3		(China) CASC	
3 July; 09:35	(China) Shiyan 28B-01	CAS	Low Earth	Technology demonstration	In orbit	Operational
3 July; 09:35	First launch of Long March 4C from Xichang since 20 May 2018.					
3 July; 19:32:40	(Russia) Soyuz-2.1a		(Kazakhstan) Baikonur Site 31/6		(Russia) Roscosmos	
3 July; 19:32:40	(Russia) Progress MS-31 / 92P	Roscosmos	Low Earth (ISS)	ISS logistics	In orbit	Docked to ISS
3 July; 19:32:40	The Soyuz launch vehicle was painted white-blue and the fairings features an insignia dedicated to celebrate 50 years since the first crewed international space mission in history, the Apollo–Soyuz Test Project that launched on 15 July 1975.					
8 July; 08:21:00	(United States) Falcon 9 Block 5	Starlink Group 10-28	(United States) Cape Canaveral SLC-40		(United States) SpaceX	
8 July; 08:21:00	(United States) Starlink × 28	SpaceX	Low Earth	Communications	In orbit	Operational
13 July; 05:04:00	(United States) Falcon 9 Block 5	F9-502	(United States) Cape Canaveral SLC-40		(United States) SpaceX	
13 July; 05:04:00	(Israel) Dror-1 (PR-8000)	IAI	Geosynchronous	Communications	In orbit	Operational
13 July; 05:04:00	500th successful launch of Falcon 9. Mission designated: "Commercial GTO-1".					
14 July; 21:34	(China) Long March 7	Y10	(China) Wenchang LC-2		(China) CASC	
14 July; 21:34	(China) Tianzhou 9	CMSA	Low Earth (TSS)	TSS logistics	In orbit	Docked to TSS
16 July; 02:05:20	(United States) Falcon 9 Block 5	Starlink Group 15-2	(United States) Vandenberg SLC-4E		(United States) SpaceX	
16 July; 02:05:20	(United States) Starlink × 26	SpaceX	Low Earth	Communications	In orbit	Operational
16 July; 06:30:00	(United States) Falcon 9 Block 5	F9-504/KF-01	(United States) Cape Canaveral SLC-40		(United States) SpaceX	
16 July; 06:30:00	(United States) KuiperSat × 24	Kuiper Systems (Amazon)	Low Earth	Communications	In orbit	Operational
16 July; 06:30:00	First of three Falcon 9 launches for Amazon's Project Kuiper.					
19 July; 03:52:59	(United States) Falcon 9 Block 5	Starlink Group 17-3	(United States) Vandenberg SLC-4E		(United States) SpaceX	
19 July; 03:52:59	(United States) Starlink × 24	SpaceX	Low Earth (SSO)	Communications	In orbit	Operational
22 July; 21:12	(United States) Falcon 9 Block 5	F9-506	(United States) Cape Canaveral SLC-40		(United States) SpaceX	
22 July; 21:12	(Luxembourg) O3b mPOWER 9 (O3b FM29)	SES S.A.	Medium Earth	Communications	In orbit	Operational
22 July; 21:12	(Luxembourg) O3b mPOWER 10 (O3b FM30)	SES S.A.	Medium Earth	Communications	In orbit	Operational
23 July; 18:13	(United States) Falcon 9 Block 5	F9-507	(United States) Vandenberg SLC-4E		(United States) SpaceX	
23 July; 18:13	(United States) TRACERS A (SMEX-16A / Explorer-106)	NASA	Low Earth (SSO)	Magnetospheric research	In orbit	Operational
23 July; 18:13	(United States) TRACERS B (SMEX-16B / Explorer-107)	NASA	Low Earth (SSO)	Magnetospheric research	In orbit	Operational
23 July; 18:13	(United States) Athena EPIC	NASA / NOAA / USSF / NovaWurks	Low Earth (SSO)	Technology demonstration	In orbit	Operational
23 July; 18:13	(Australia) Skykraft 4A-4E	Skykraft	Low Earth (SSO)	Communications	In orbit	Operational
23 July; 18:13	⚀ (United States) Bard (PExT)	York Space Systems / APL	Low Earth (SSO)	Technology demonstration	In orbit	Operational
23 July; 18:13	⚀ (European Union) LIDE	ESA / Tyvak International	Low Earth (SSO)	Technology demonstration	In orbit	Operational
23 July; 18:13	⚀ (United States) REAL	Dartmouth College	Low Earth (SSO)	Ionospheric research	In orbit	Operational
23 July; 18:13	TRACERS is part of NASA's Small Explorers program. The ELaNa-64 mission consists of the REAL cubesat.					
25 July; 05:54:04	(Russia) Soyuz-2.1b / Fregat-M		(Russia) Vostochny Site 1S		(Russia) Roscosmos	
25 July; 05:54:04	(Russia) Ionosfera-M №3	IKI RAN	Low Earth (SSO)	Ionospheric; Magnetospheric research	In orbit	Operational
25 July; 05:54:04	(Russia) Ionosfera-M №4	IKI RAN	Low Earth (SSO)	Ionospheric; Magnetospheric research	In orbit	Operational
25 July; 05:54:04	(Iran) Nahid-2	ISA	Low Earth (SSO)	Communications	In orbit	Operational
25 July; 05:54:04	⚀ (Russia) 239Alferov	GK Geoskan	Low Earth (SSO)	Gamma-ray astronomy	In orbit	Operational
25 July; 05:54:04	⚀ (Russia) AstroLine 1-4	AO NPF Rateks	Low Earth (SSO)	TBA	In orbit	Operational
25 July; 05:54:04	⚀ (Russia) CSTP-4.1 (SCH-619)	OOO STTs	Low Earth (SSO)	TBA	In orbit	Operational
25 July; 05:54:04	⚀ (Russia) CSTP-4.2 (SM-3.1)	OOO STTs	Low Earth (SSO)	TBA	In orbit	Operational
25 July; 05:54:04	⚀ (Russia) CSTP-4.3 (ANSAT-1)	OOO STTs	Low Earth (SSO)	TBA	In orbit	Operational
25 July; 05:54:04	⚀ (Russia) CSTP-4.4 (VM-3.1 / Voenmekh)	OOO STTs / Baltic State Technical University	Low Earth (SSO)	TBA	In orbit	Operational
25 July; 05:54:04	⚀ (Russia) Geoskan 1-6	GK Geoskan	Low Earth (SSO)	Technology demonstration	In orbit	Operational
25 July; 05:54:04	⚀ (Russia) INNOSAT-3,16	GK Geoskan	Low Earth (SSO)	Technology demonstration	In orbit	Operational
25 July; 05:54:04	GK Launch Services commercial rideshare mission.					
26 July; 02:03	(Italy) Vega-C	VV27	(France) Kourou ELV		(France) Arianespace	
26 July; 02:03	(France) CO3D × 4	CNES	Low Earth (SSO)	Earth observation	In orbit	Operational
26 July; 02:03	(France) MicroCarb	CNES	Low Earth (SSO)	Earth observation	In orbit	Operational
26 July; 09:01:40	(United States) Falcon 9 Block 5	Starlink Group 10-26	(United States) Cape Canaveral SLC-40		(United States) SpaceX	
26 July; 09:01:40	(United States) Starlink × 28	SpaceX	Low Earth	Communications	In orbit	Operational
27 July; 04:31:09	(United States) Falcon 9 Block 5	Starlink Group 17-2	(United States) Vandenberg SLC-4E		(United States) SpaceX	
27 July; 04:31:09	(United States) Starlink × 24	SpaceX	Low Earth (SSO)	Communications	In orbit	Operational
27 July; 10:03	(China) Long March 6A	6A-Y14 / SatNet LEO Group 05	(China) Taiyuan LA-9A		(China) CASC	
27 July; 10:03	(China) Guowang × 5	CAST	Low Earth (Polar)	Communications	In orbit	Operational
29 July; 04:11	(China) Hyperbola-1	Y10	(China) Jiuquan LS-95A		(China) i-Space	
29 July; 04:11	⚀ (China) Kunpeng-03 (Enshi Xidou Shanquan / HS-9)	Hangsheng Satellite / Tianxieli Satellite	Low Earth (SSO)	Earth observation	In orbit	Operational
29 July; 04:11	Return flight of Hyperbola-1 from launch failure on 11 July 2024.					
29 July; 21:30	(Australia) Eris Block 1	TestFlight 1	(Australia) Bowen		(Australia) Gilmour Space	
29 July; 21:30	(Australia) Jar of Vegemite	Gilmour Space	Low Earth	Flight test	29 July	Launch failure
29 July; 21:30	First flight of Eris, and first orbital launch from Bowen. First launch of an Australian developed launch vehicle. Was prepared for launch in mid May when the payload fairing was triggered accidentally.					
30 July; 03:37:50	(United States) Falcon 9 Block 5	Starlink Group 10-29	(United States) Cape Canaveral SLC-40		(United States) SpaceX	
30 July; 03:37:50	(United States) Starlink × 28	SpaceX	Low Earth	Communications	In orbit	Operational
30 July; 07:49	(China) Long March 8A	8A-Y3 / SatNet LEO Group 06	(China) Wenchang Commercial LC-1		(China) CASC	
30 July; 07:49	(China) Guowang × 9	CAST / SECM	Low Earth (SSO)	Communications	In orbit	Operational
30 July; 07:49	First flight of Long March 8A from Wenchang Commercial Space Launch Site.					
30 July; 12:10	(India) GSLV Mk II	F16	(India) Satish Dhawan SLP		(India) ISRO	
30 July; 12:10	(United States) (India) NISAR	NASA / ISRO	Low Earth (SSO)	Earth observation	In orbit	Operational
30 July; 12:10	First GSLV Mk II launch to LEO. First Mission between ISRO and NASA.					
31 July; 02:00	(China) Kuaizhou 1A Pro	Y34	(China) Xichang		(China) ExPace	
31 July; 02:00	(Pakistan) PRSC-S1	SUPARCO	Low Earth	Earth observation	In orbit	Operational
31 July; 18:35:09	(United States) Falcon 9 Block 5	Starlink Group 13-4	(United States) Vandenberg SLC-4E		(United States) SpaceX	
31 July; 18:35:09	(United States) Starlink × 19	SpaceX	Low Earth (SSO)	Communications	In orbit	Operational
31 July; 18:35:09	(United States) USA-549 (Starshield Group 2-4)	TBA	Low Earth (SSO)	Communications	In orbit	Operational
31 July; 18:35:09	(United States) USA-550 (Starshield Group 2-4)	TBA	Low Earth (SSO)	Communications	In orbit	Operational

- ← Jan
- Feb
- Mar
- Apr
- May
- Jun
- Jul
- Aug
- Sep
- Oct
- Nov
- Dec →

=== August ===
Date and time (UTC)	Rocket	Flight number	Launch site		LSP	
Date and time (UTC)	Payload (⚀ = CubeSat)	Operator	Orbit	Function	Decay (UTC)	Outcome
Date and time (UTC)	Remarks					
1 August; 15:43:42	(United States) Falcon 9 Block 5	F9-512	(United States) Kennedy LC-39A		(United States) SpaceX	
1 August; 15:43:42	(United States) SpaceX Crew-11 (Endeavour)	NASA	Low Earth (ISS)	Expedition 73 / 74	15 January 2026; 08:41:00	Successful
1 August; 15:43:42	Eleventh operational Crew Dragon mission to the ISS.					
4 August; 07:57:50	(United States) Falcon 9 Block 5	Starlink Group 10-30	(United States) Cape Canaveral SLC-40		(United States) SpaceX	
4 August; 07:57:50	(United States) Starlink × 28	SpaceX	Low Earth	Communications	In orbit	Operational
4 August; 10:21	(China) Long March 12	Y2 / SatNet LEO Group 07	(China) Wenchang Commercial LC-2		(China) CASC	
4 August; 10:21	(China) Guowang × 9	CAST / Galaxy Space	Low Earth	Communications	In orbit	Operational
5 August; 04:10	(United States) Electron	"The Harvest Goddess Thrives"	(New Zealand) Mahia LC-1B		(United States) Rocket Lab	
5 August; 04:10	(Japan) QPS-SAR 12 (KUSHINADA-I)	iQPS	Low Earth (SSO)	Earth observation	In orbit	Operational
5 August; 04:10	Fourth of eight dedicated launches to support the build out of iQPS’ planned constellation of 36 synthetic aperture radar (SAR) satellites.					
8 August; 16:30	(China) Jielong 3	Y6	(China) Dong Fang Hang Tian Gang platform, Yellow Sea		China Rocket	
8 August; 16:30	(China) GeeSat Qianli Haohan	Geespace	Low Earth (SSO)	Navigation / Communications	In orbit	Operational
8 August; 16:30	(China) GeeSat ZoomLion	Geespace	Low Earth (SSO)	Navigation / Communications	In orbit	Operational
8 August; 16:30	(China) GeeSat × 9	Geespace	Low Earth (SSO)	Navigation / Communications	In orbit	Operational
11 August; 12:35	(United States) Falcon 9 Block 5	F9-514/KF-02	(United States) Cape Canaveral SLC-40		(United States) SpaceX	
11 August; 12:35	(United States) KuiperSat × 24	Kuiper Systems	Low Earth	Communications	In orbit	Operational
11 August; 12:35	Second of three Falcon 9 launches for Project Kuiper. First launch of Falcon 9 First Stage Booster (B1091), The first Falcon Heavy center core capable of flying in a single-stick Falcon 9 configuration, this booster configuration will support some Falcon 9 launches before it will be reconfigured to support Falcon Heavy.					
13 August; 00:37	(France) Ariane 62	VA264	(France) Kourou ELA-4		(France) Arianespace	
13 August; 00:37	MetOp-SG A1/Sentinel-5A	EUMETSAT	Low Earth (SSO)	Meteorology / Earth observation	In orbit	Operational
13 August; 00:37	First of six MetOp-SG launches. It carries the Sentinel-5 instrument on board.					
13 August; 00:56	(United States) Vulcan Centaur VC4S	V-003	(United States) Cape Canaveral SLC-41		(United States) ULA	
13 August; 00:56	(United States) NTS-3	AFRL	Geosynchronous	Navigation technology demonstration	In orbit	Operational
13 August; 00:56	(United States) USA-554	USSF	Geosynchronous	TBA	In orbit	Operational
13 August; 00:56	(United States) USA-571	USSF	Geosynchronous	TBA	In orbit	Operational
13 August; 00:56	USSF-106 Mission. Maiden flight of Vulcan Centaur VC4S Configuration. First NSSL mission for Vulcan Centaur.					
13 August; 06:43	(China) Long March 5B / YZ-2	5B-Y8/SatNet LEO Group 08	(China) Wenchang LC-1		(China) CASC	
13 August; 06:43	(China) Guowang × 10	CAST	Low Earth (Polar)	Communications	In orbit	Operational
14 August; 05:05:37	(United States) Falcon 9 Block 5	Starlink Group 17-4	(United States) Vandenberg SLC-4E		(United States) SpaceX	
14 August; 05:05:37	(United States) Starlink × 24	SpaceX	Low Earth (SSO)	Communications	In orbit	Operational
14 August; 12:29:30	(United States) Falcon 9 Block 5	Starlink Group 10-20	(United States) Cape Canaveral SLC-40		(United States) SpaceX	
14 August; 12:29:30	(United States) Starlink × 28	SpaceX	Low Earth	Communications	In orbit	Operational
14 August; 12:29:30	B1085 became the first booster to complete 10 missions within its first year of use, with Starlink Group 10-20 lifting off 359 days after B1085 debuted on Starlink Group 10-5.					
15 August; 01:17	(China) Zhuque-2E	Y3	(China) Jiuquan LS-96		(China) Land Space	
15 August; 01:17	(China) GuangChuan × 4	CAST	Low Earth (SSO)	TBA	15 August	Launch failure
17 August; 08:55	(China) Long March 4C	4C-Y64	(China) Xichang LC-3		(China) CASC	
17 August; 08:55	(China) Shiyan 28B-02	CAS	Low Earth	Technology demonstration	In orbit	Operational
17 August; 14:15	(China) Long March 6A	6A-Y10 / SatNet LEO Group 09	(China) Taiyuan LA-9A		(China) CASC	
17 August; 14:15	(China) Guowang × 5	CAST	Low Earth (Polar)	Communications	In orbit	Operational
18 August; 16:26:49	(United States) Falcon 9 Block 5	Starlink Group 17-5	(United States) Vandenberg SLC-4E		(United States) SpaceX	
18 August; 16:26:49	(United States) Starlink × 24	SpaceX	Low Earth (SSO)	Communications	In orbit	Operational
19 August; 07:33	(China) Kinetica 1	Y10	(China) Jiuquan LS-130		(China) CAS Space	
19 August; 07:33	(China) AIRSAT-05 (Hashiao-2 / Zhongke-05)	China Science and Technology Satellite Group Co., Ltd.	Low Earth (SSO)	Earth observation	In orbit	Operational
19 August; 07:33	(China) Duogongfeng 2-01, 02	PLA Academy of Military Sciences / NUDT	Low Earth (SSO)	Earth observation	In orbit	Operational
19 August; 07:33	(China) Duogongfeng 2-03 (Tiantuo-6)	PLA Academy of Military Sciences / NUDT	Low Earth (SSO)	Earth observation	In orbit	Operational
19 August; 07:33	(Mexico) Thumbsat-1, 2	Thumbsat	Low Earth (SSO)	Technology demonstration	In orbit	Operational
19 August; 07:33	(China) Tianyan-26 (Henan Lingong-2 / Zhongyuan-3 / Novi-1)	Shaanxi Novi Beidou Information Technology Co., Ltd.	Low Earth (SSO)	Earth observation	In orbit	Operational
20 August; 17:13:10	(Russia) Soyuz-2.1b		(Kazakhstan) Baikonur Site 31/6		(Russia) Roscosmos	
20 August; 17:13:10	(Russia) Bion-M №2	IMBP / RAS	Low Earth	Biological science	19 September; 08:00	Successful
20 August; 17:13:10	30-day mission to observe the effects of the Van Allen radiation belts on mice. First Bion-M mission since 2013. Spacecraft is a derivative of the Vostok spacecraft.					
21 August; 09:32	(Russia) Angara-1.2		(Russia) Plesetsk Site 35/1		(Russia) RVSN RF	
21 August; 09:32	(Russia) Kosmos 2591 (OO MKA №3)	VKS	Low Earth	Reconnaissance	In orbit	Operational
21 August; 09:32	(Russia) Kosmos 2592 (OO MKA №4)	VKS	Low Earth	Reconnaissance	In orbit	Operational
21 August; 09:32	(Russia) Kosmos 2593 (OO MKA №5)	VKS	Low Earth	Reconnaissance	In orbit	Operational
21 August; 09:32	(Russia) Kosmos 2594 (OO MKA №6)	VKS	Low Earth	Reconnaissance	In orbit	Operational
22 August; 03:50	(United States) Falcon 9 Block 5	F9-518	(United States) Kennedy LC-39A		(United States) SpaceX	
22 August; 03:50	(United States) X-37B OTV-8 (USA-555)	USSF	Low Earth	TBA	In orbit	Operational
22 August; 03:50	(United States) LIMASAT	TBA	Low Earth	TBA	In orbit	Operational
22 August; 03:50	USSF-36 Mission.					
22 August; 17:04:49	(United States) Falcon 9 Block 5	Starlink Group 17-6	(United States) Vandenberg SLC-4E		(United States) SpaceX	
22 August; 17:04:49	(United States) Starlink × 24	SpaceX	Low Earth (SSO)	Communications	In orbit	Operational
23 August; 22:42	(United States) Electron	"Live, Laugh, Launch"	(New Zealand) Mahia LC-1A		(United States) Rocket Lab	
23 August; 22:42	(Rwanda) Calistus-A	E-Space	Low Earth (SSO)	Technology demonstration	In orbit	Operational
23 August; 22:42	(Rwanda) Calistus-B	E-Space	Low Earth (SSO)	Technology demonstration	In orbit	Operational
23 August; 22:42	(Rwanda) Calistus-C	E-Space	Low Earth (SSO)	Technology demonstration	In orbit	Operational
23 August; 22:42	(Rwanda) Calistus-D	E-Space	Low Earth (SSO)	Technology demonstration	In orbit	Operational
23 August; 22:42	(Rwanda) Calistus-E	E-Space	Low Earth (SSO)	Technology demonstration	In orbit	Operational
24 August; 06:45	(United States) Falcon 9 Block 5	F9-520	(United States) Cape Canaveral SLC-40		(United States) SpaceX	
24 August; 06:45	(United States) SpaceX CRS-33	NASA	Low Earth (ISS)	ISS logistics	In orbit	Docked to ISS
24 August; 06:45	⚀ (Japan) ASC	Abema / Yoshimoto Kogyo	Low Earth (ISS)	Entertainment	In orbit	Operational
24 August; 06:45	⚀ (Japan) Dragonfly	Kyushu Institute of Technology	Low Earth (ISS)	Amateur radio / Technology demonstration	In orbit	Operational
24 August; 06:45	⚀ (Japan) GHS-01 "Raichō"	Gifu University	Low Earth	Educational	In orbit	Operational
24 August; 06:45	⚀ (Japan) RSP-03	Rymansat	Low Earth (ISS)	Music composition	16 February 2026	Successful
24 August; 06:45	⚀ (Japan) STARS-Me2	Shizuoka University	Low Earth	Technology demonstration	In orbit	Operational
24 August; 06:45	The mission will fly with a "boost trunk" with extra propellant and engines to perform re-boosts of the ISS over a period of several months. ASC, Dragonfly, GHS-01, RSP-03, and STARS-Me2 were deployed into orbit from the ISS on 19 September 2025.					
25 August; 19:08	(China) Long March 8A	8A-Y2 / SatNet LEO Group 10	(China) Wenchang Commercial LC-1		(China) CASC	
25 August; 19:08	(China) Guowang × 9	CAST	Low Earth	Communications	In orbit	Operational
26 August; 18:53	(United States) Falcon 9 Block 5	F9-521	(United States) Vandenberg SLC-4E		(United States) SpaceX	
26 August; 18:53	(Luxembourg) NAOS (LUXEOSys)	LUXEOps / MAE	Low Earth (SSO)	Earth observation / Reconnaissance	In orbit	Operational
26 August; 18:53	(United States) Acadia-6 (Capella-16)	Capella Space	Low Earth (SSO)	Earth observation	In orbit	Operational
26 August; 18:53	(India) Firefly 4,5,6	Pixxel	Low Earth (SSO)	Earth observation	In orbit	Operational
26 August; 18:53	(India) LEAP-1	Dhruva Space	Low Earth (SSO)	Technology demonstration	In orbit	Operational
26 August; 18:53	(United States) Pelican-3 & 4	Planet Labs	Low Earth (SSO)	Earth observation	In orbit	Operational
27 August; 11:10:40	(United States) Falcon 9 Block 5	Starlink Group 10-56	(United States) Cape Canaveral SLC-40		(United States) SpaceX	
27 August; 11:10:40	(United States) Starlink × 28	SpaceX	Low Earth	Communications	In orbit	Operational
28 August; 08:12:00	(United States) Falcon 9 Block 5	Starlink Group 10-11	(United States) Kennedy LC-39A		(United States) SpaceX	
28 August; 08:12:00	(United States) Starlink × 28	SpaceX	Low Earth	Communications	In orbit	Operational
28 August; 08:12:00	Falcon 9 First Stage Booster (B1067) become the first booster to launch 30 missions.					
30 August; 04:59:14	(United States) Falcon 9 Block 5	Starlink Group 17-7	(United States) Vandenberg SLC-4E		(United States) SpaceX	
30 August; 04:59:14	(United States) Starlink × 24	SpaceX	Low Earth (SSO)	Communications	In orbit	Operational
31 August; 11:49:00	(United States) Falcon 9 Block 5	Starlink Group 10-14	(United States) Cape Canaveral SLC-40		(United States) SpaceX	
31 August; 11:49:00	(United States) Starlink × 28	SpaceX	Low Earth	Communications	In orbit	Operational

- ← Jan
- Feb
- Mar
- Apr
- May
- Jun
- Jul
- Aug
- Sep
- Oct
- Nov
- Dec →

=== September ===
Date and time (UTC)	Rocket	Flight number	Launch site		LSP	
Date and time (UTC)	Payload (⚀ = CubeSat)	Operator	Orbit	Function	Decay (UTC)	Outcome
Date and time (UTC)	Remarks					
2 September; 19:30	(Israel) Shavit 2		(Israel) Palmachim		(Israel) IAI	
2 September; 19:30	(Israel) Ofeq-19 (TECSAR-4)	Israel Ministry of Defence	Low Earth (Retrograde)	Reconnaissance	In orbit	Operational
3 September; 03:51:26	(United States) Falcon 9 Block 5	Starlink Group 17-8	(United States) Vandenberg SLC-4E		(United States) SpaceX	
3 September; 03:51:26	(United States) Starlink × 24	SpaceX	Low Earth (SSO)	Communications	In orbit	Operational
3 September; 11:00	(United States) Falcon 9 Block 5	Starlink Group 10-22	(United States) Cape Canaveral SLC-40		(United States) SpaceX	
3 September; 11:00	(United States) Starlink × 28	SpaceX	Low Earth	Communications	In orbit	Operational
5 September; 02:35	(China) Long March 3C/E / YZ-1	3C-Y20	(China) Xichang LC-2		(China) CASC	
5 September; 02:35	(China) Shiyan 29	TBA	Geosynchronous	TBA	In orbit	Operational
5 September; 11:35	(China) Ceres-1	Y15	(China) Jiuquan LS-95A		(China) Galactic Energy	
5 September; 11:35	(China) Kaiyun-1 (Jiazhou)	TBA	Low Earth (SSO)	TBA	In orbit	Operational
5 September; 11:35	(China) Yuxing-3 08	TBA	Low Earth (SSO)	TBA	In orbit	Operational
5 September; 11:35	(China) Yunyao-1 27	CGSTL	Low Earth (SSO)	Earth observation	In orbit	Operational
5 September; 11:35	Eros-2 was on board in this flight.					
5 September; 13:56	(United States) Falcon 9 Block 5	Starlink Group 10-57	(United States) Kennedy LC-39A		(United States) SpaceX	
5 September; 13:56	(United States) Starlink × 28	SpaceX	Low Earth	Communications	In orbit	Operational
5 September; 13:56	500th launch and landing of an orbital class booster.					
6 September; 16:35	(China) Long March 6A	6A-Y12	(China) Taiyuan LA-9A		(China) CASC	
6 September; 16:35	(China) Yaogan 40-03A	TBA	Low Earth (Polar)	Reconnaissance	In orbit	Operational
6 September; 16:35	(China) Yaogan 40-03B	TBA	Low Earth (Polar)	Reconnaissance	In orbit	Operational
6 September; 16:35	(China) Yaogan 40-03C	TBA	Low Earth (Polar)	Reconnaissance	In orbit	Operational
6 September; 18:06	(United States) Falcon 9 Block 5	Starlink Group 17-9	(United States) Vandenberg SLC-4E		(United States) SpaceX	
6 September; 18:06	(United States) Starlink × 24	SpaceX	Low Earth (SSO)	Communications	In orbit	Operational
6 September; 18:06	300th Starlink launch.					
8 September; 19:48	(China) Jielong 3	Y7	(China) Dong Fang Hang Tian Gang platform, Yellow Sea		China Rocket	
8 September; 19:48	(China) GeeSat × 11	Geespace	Low Earth (SSO)	Navigation / Communications	In orbit	Operational
9 September; 02:00	(China) Long March 7A	7A-Y14	(China) Wenchang LC-2		(China) CASC	
9 September; 02:00	(China) Yaogan 45	SAST	Medium Earth	Reconnaissance	In orbit	Operational
10 September; 13:12	(United States) Falcon 9 Block 5	F9-530	(United States) Vandenberg SLC-4E		(United States) SpaceX	
10 September; 13:12	(United States) T1TL-B × 21	SDA	Low Earth (SSO)	Military communications	In orbit	Operational
10 September; 13:12	First of six launches for the Space Development Agency's Transport Layer Tranche 1 (T1TL-B Mission).					
11 September; 15:54	(Russia) Soyuz-2.1a		(Kazakhstan) Baikonur Site 31/6		(Russia) Roscosmos	
11 September; 15:54	(Russia) Progress MS-32 / 93P	Roscosmos	Low Earth (ISS)	ISS logistics	In orbit	Docked to ISS
12 September; 00:56	(United States) Falcon 9 Block 5	F9-531	(United States) Cape Canaveral SLC-40		(United States) SpaceX	
12 September; 00:56	(Indonesia) Nusantara Lima (Nusantara-5)	PSN	Geosynchronous	Communications	In orbit	Operational
12 September; 00:56	With a mass of 7.8 tonnes, Nusantara Lima is the second heaviest commercial geostationary satellite to have ever launched and Nusantara Lima is the heaviest Satellite to be launched into GTO by Falcon 9.					
13 September; 02:10	(Russia) Soyuz-2.1b / Fregat-M		(Russia) Plesetsk Site 43/3		(Russia) RVSN RF	
13 September; 02:10	(Russia) Kosmos 2595 (GLONASS-K 18L (K1 №6))	VKS	Medium Earth	Navigation	In orbit	Operational
13 September; 02:10	(Russia) Kosmos 2596 (Mozhaets-6)	Mozhaiskiy Military Space Academy of St. Petersburg	Medium Earth	Technology demonstration	In orbit	Operational
13 September; 15:40	(United States) Falcon 9 Block 5	Starlink Group 17-10	(United States) Vandenberg SLC-4E		(United States) SpaceX	
13 September; 15:40	(United States) Starlink × 24	SpaceX	Low Earth (SSO)	Communications	In orbit	Operational
14 September; 22:11	(United States) Falcon 9 Block 5	F9-533	(United States) Cape Canaveral SLC-40		(United States) SpaceX	
14 September; 22:11	(United States) Cygnus NG-23; S.S. William "Willie" C. McCool	NASA	Low Earth (ISS)	ISS logistics	14 March 2026	Successful
14 September; 22:11	⚀ (United States) Alpha (CayugaSat)	Cornell University	Low Earth (ISS)	Technology demonstration / Solar sail	8 May 2026	Successful
14 September; 22:11	⚀ (United States) BLAST	Yale University	Low Earth (ISS)	Cosmic ray astronomy	In orbit	Awaiting deployment
14 September; 22:11	⚀ (Japan) Botan	Chiba Institute of Technology	Low Earth	Technology demonstration / Amateur Radio	19 April 2026	Successful
14 September; 22:11	⚀ (United States) ContentCube	inspireFly / Virginia Tech	Low Earth (ISS)	Space selfie	In orbit	Operational
14 September; 22:11	⚀ (United States) DUPLEX	CU Aerospace	Low Earth (ISS)	Technology demonstration	In orbit	Operational
14 September; 22:11	⚀ (United States) EagleSat-2	Embry–Riddle Aeronautical University, Prescott	Low Earth (ISS)	Cosmic ray astronomy	17 May 2026	Successful
14 September; 22:11	⚀ (Japan) e-kagaku-1 (IWATO)	The e-kagaku Association of Global Science and Education	Low Earth	Education / Amateur radio	4 March 2026	Successful
14 September; 22:11	⚀ (United States) Foras Promineo	Perkins Local School District	Low Earth	Education	11 April 2026	Successful
14 September; 22:11	⚀ (United States) QubeSat-2	University of California, Berkeley	Low Earth (ISS)	Technology demonstration	In orbit	Awaiting deployment
14 September; 22:11	⚀ (United States) RHOK-SAT	Rhodes College	Low Earth (ISS)	Technology demonstration / Education	8 May 2026	Successful
14 September; 22:11	⚀ (United States) SilverSat	SilverSat	Low Earth	Technology demonstration / Education	23 April 2026	Successful
14 September; 22:11	⚀ (Japan) Yotsuba-Kulover	Kyushu Institute of Technology / Kyushu University	Low Earth	Magnetospheric research / Aurora observation	17 April 2026	Successful
14 September; 22:11	Named after NASA astronaut William C. McCool. Third of Four Cygnus spacecraft to be launched via Falcon 9. First flight of Cygnus XL spacecraft. The ELaNa-58 mission, consisting of the BLAST, EagleSat-2, QubeSat-2 and RHOK-SAT cubesats, launched on this flight. Yotsuba-Kulover, e-kagaku-1, and Botan were deployed into orbit from the ISS on 10 October 2025. DUPLEX, SilverSat, RHOK-SAT, ContentCube, Alpha, EagleSat-2, and Foras Promineo were deployed into orbit from the ISS on 2 December 2025.					
16 September; 01:06	(China) Long March 2C / YZ-1S	2C-Y87	(China) Jiuquan SLS-2		(China) CASC	
16 September; 01:06	(China) Huliangwang Jishu Shiyan-7A	TBA	Low Earth	TBA	In orbit	Operational
16 September; 01:06	(China) Huliangwang Jishu Shiyan-7B	TBA	Low Earth	TBA	In orbit	Operational
16 September; 01:06	(China) Huliangwang Jishu Shiyan-7C	TBA	Low Earth	TBA	In orbit	Operational
16 September; 01:06	(China) Huliangwang Jishu Shiyan-7D	TBA	Low Earth	TBA	In orbit	Operational
16 September; 01:06	Return to flight of YZ-1S after a Partial Failure on 13 March 2024 carrying DRO-A & B.					
18 September; 09:30	(United States) Falcon 9 Block 5	Starlink Group 10-61	(United States) Cape Canaveral SLC-40		(United States) SpaceX	
18 September; 09:30	(United States) Starlink × 28	SpaceX	Low Earth	Communications	In orbit	Operational
18 September; 15:00	(Iran) Zuljanah		(Iran) Semnan		(Iran) IRGC	
18 September; 15:00	(Iran) TBA	TBA	Low Earth	TBA	In orbit	Launch failure
19 September; 16:31	(United States) Falcon 9 Block 5	Starlink Group 17-12	(United States) Vandenberg SLC-4E		(United States) SpaceX	
19 September; 16:31	(United States) Starlink × 24	SpaceX	Low Earth (SSO)	Communications	In orbit	Operational
21 September; 10:53	(United States) Falcon 9 Block 5	Starlink Group 10-27	(United States) Cape Canaveral SLC-40		(United States) SpaceX	
21 September; 10:53	(United States) Starlink × 28	SpaceX	Low Earth	Communications	In orbit	Operational
22 September; 17:38	(United States) Falcon 9 Block 5	F9-537	(United States) Vandenberg SLC-4E		(United States) SpaceX	
22 September; 17:38	(United States) USA-558 - USA-565 (Starshield Group 1-10)	NRO	Low Earth (SSO)	Reconnaissance	In orbit	Operational
22 September; 17:38	NROL-48 Mission (NRO Proliferated Architecture Mission). Eleventh batch of SpaceX/Northrop built 8 Starshield satellites for the National Reconnaissance Office.					
24 September; 07:56	(China) Jielong 3	Y8	(China) Dong Fang Hang Tian Gang platform, Yellow Sea		China Rocket	
24 September; 07:56	(China) GeeSat × 12	Geespace	Low Earth (SSO)	Navigation / Communications	In orbit	Operational
24 September; 07:56	(China) Shikongxing 01	Geespace	Low Earth (SSO)	Technology demonstration	In orbit	Operational
24 September; 11:30	(United States) Falcon 9 Block 5	F9-538	(United States) Kennedy LC-39A		(United States) SpaceX	
24 September; 11:30	(United States) IMAP	NASA	Sun–Earth L_{1}	Heliophysics	In orbit	Operational
24 September; 11:30	(United States) Carruthers Geocorona Observatory (GLIDE)	NASA	Sun–Earth L_{1}	Exosphere research	In orbit	Operational
24 September; 11:30	(United States) SOLAR-1 (SWFO-L1)	NOAA	Sun–Earth L_{1}	Space weather	In orbit	Operational
24 September; 11:30	Part of the Solar Terrestrial Probes program. Under NASA's SMD Rideshare Initiative, two secondary spacecraft will be launched along with IMAP to the Sun–Earth L_{1} point.					
25 September; 08:36	(United States) Falcon 9 Block 5	Starlink Group 10-15	(United States) Cape Canaveral SLC-40		(United States) SpaceX	
25 September; 08:36	(United States) Starlink × 28	SpaceX	Low Earth	Communications	In orbit	Operational
25 September; 12:09	(United States) Atlas V 551	AV-108/KA-03/Kuiper-3	(United States) Cape Canaveral SLC-41		(United States) ULA	
25 September; 12:09	(United States) KuiperSat × 27	Kuiper Systems	Low Earth	Communications	In orbit	Operational
25 September; 12:09	Fourth of nine Project Kuiper launches on Atlas V.					
26 September; 03:26	(United States) Falcon 9 Block 5	Starlink Group 17-11	(United States) Vandenberg SLC-4E		(United States) SpaceX	
26 September; 03:26	(United States) Starlink × 24	SpaceX	Low Earth	Communications	In orbit	Operational
26 September; 19:20	(China) Long March 4C	4C-Y45	(China) Jiuquan SLS-2		(China) CASC	
26 September; 19:20	(China) Fengyun-3H	CMA	Low Earth (SSO)	Meteorology	In orbit	Operational
26 September; 19:20	Replacement Satellite for Fengyun-3D.					
27 September; 12:40	(China) Long March 6A	6A-Y16 / SatNet LEO Group 11	(China) Taiyuan LA-9A		(China) CASC	
27 September; 12:40	(China) Guowang × 5	TBA	Low Earth (SSO)	Communications	In orbit	Operational
29 September; 02:04	(United States) Falcon 9 Block 5	Starlink Group 11-20	(United States) Vandenberg SLC-4E		(United States) SpaceX	
29 September; 02:04	(United States) Starlink × 28	SpaceX	Low Earth	Communications	In orbit	Operational
29 September; 03:00	(China) Long March 2D	2D-Y94	(China) Xichang LC-3		(China) CASC	
29 September; 03:00	(China) Shiyan 30A	TBA	Low Earth	TBA	In orbit	Operational
29 September; 03:00	(China) Shiyan 30B	TBA	Low Earth	TBA	In orbit	Operational
29 September; 03:00	100th launch of Long March 2D.					

- ← Jan
- Feb
- Mar
- Apr
- May
- Jun
- Jul
- Aug
- Sep
- Oct
- Nov
- Dec →

== Suborbital flights ==
Date and time (UTC)	Rocket	Flight number	Launch site		LSP	
Date and time (UTC)	Payload (⚀ = CubeSat)	Operator	Orbit	Function	Decay (UTC)	Outcome
Date and time (UTC)	Remarks					
5 July; 06:00	(United States) Improved Malemute		(Norway) Andøya		(Germany) DLR	
5 July; 06:00	(Norway) MaxiDusty-2	The Arctic University of Norway Andøya Space	Suborbital	Atmospheric observation	5 July	Successful
5 July; 06:00	Apogee: 125 km (78 mi).					
12 July; 02:40	(Taiwan) VP01		(Japan) Taiki		(Taiwan) jtSPACE	
12 July; 02:40	(Taiwan)	jtSPACE	Suborbital	Rocket technology demonstration	12 July	Failure
12 July; 02:40	First launch from Taiki by the Japanese subsidiary of Taiwanese company tiSPACE.					
15 July; 03:00:00	(Japan) S-310	S-310-46	(Japan) Uchinoura Space Center		(Japan) JAXA	
15 July; 03:00:00	(Japan) RIDE	JAXA	Suborbital	Ionosphere observation	15 July	Successful
15 July; 03:00:00	Apogee: 110 km (68 mi).					
18 July; 19:00	(Canada) Black Brant IX	NASA 36.372US	(United States) White Sands Missile Range		(United States) NASA	
18 July; 19:00	(United States) SNIFS	University of Colorado	Suborbital	Solar observation	18 July	Successful
18 July; 19:00	Apogee: 350 km (220 mi).					
20 July	(Iran) Qased		(Iran) Shahroud LC-1		(Iran) IRGC	
20 July	(Iran)	IRGC	Suborbital	Test flight	20 July	Successful
24 July; 01:30?	(United States) Terrier-Oriole?	MUFFIN	(United States) Wallops Flight Facility		(United States) NASA	
24 July; 01:30?	(United States)	MDA?	Suborbital	Technology demonstration	24 July	Successful
3 August; 12:42:16	(United States) New Shepard	NS-34	(United States) Corn Ranch		(United States) Blue Origin	
3 August; 12:42:16	(United States) Blue Origin NS-34	Blue Origin	Suborbital	Space tourism	3 August	Successful
3 August; 12:42:16	14th crewed New Shepard flight. Crew of six.					
12 August; 10:00:00	(United States) Terrier-Improved Malemute	NASA 46.043WO	(United States) Wallops Flight Facility		(United States) NASA	
12 August; 10:00:00	(United States) ROCKSAT-X	NASA Wallops Flight Facility	Suborbital	Education	12 August	Successful
15 August; 09:34	(Canada) Starsailor		(Canada) Mistissini		(Canada) Space Concordia	
15 August; 09:34	(Canada)	Space Concordia	Suborbital	Education	12 August	Launch failure
15 August; 09:34	Test flight of the Starsailor suborbital launch vehicle. Aimed to reach an apogee of 120 km. Failure caused by an early payload separation.					
20 August	(India) Agni-V		(India) Integrated Test Range		(India) Ministry of Defence	
20 August	(India)	Ministry of Defence	Suborbital	Missile test	20 August	Successful
22 August; 06:10	(United States) STARS-4 ?	CPS FT-3R	(United States) Kodiak		(United States) Department of Defense	
22 August; 06:10	(United States)	Department of Defense	Suborbital	Missile test	22 August	Successful
22 August; 06:10	Hypersonic Flight Test-3 (FT-3R).					
26 August; 23:30:00	(United States) Starship	Flight 10	(United States) Starbase OLP-A		(United States) SpaceX	
26 August; 23:30:00	(United States) Starlink Simulators × 8	SpaceX	Suborbital	Vehicle evaluation	26 August; 23:55:32	Successful
26 August; 23:30:00	Tenth Starship flight test					
28 August; 02:43:00	(United States) Terrier-Improved Orion	NASA 41.123CE	(United States) Wallops Flight Facility		(United States) NASA	
28 August; 02:43:00	(United States) TOMEX-Plus	The Aerospace Corporation	Suborbital	Aeronomy	28 August	Successful
28 August; 02:43:00	First of three launches for the Turbulent Oxygen Mixing Experiment Plus (TOMEX-Plus).					
28 August; 02:44:00	(United States) Terrier-Improved Orion	NASA 41.124CE	(United States) Wallops Flight Facility		(United States) NASA	
28 August; 02:44:00	(United States) TOMEX-Plus	The Aerospace Corporation	Suborbital	Aeronomy	28 August	Successful
28 August; 02:44:00	Second of three launches for TOMEX-Plus.					
28 August; 02:48:30	(Canada) Black Brant IX	NASA 36.335CE	(United States) Wallops Flight Facility		(United States) NASA	
28 August; 02:48:30	(United States) TOMEX-Plus	The Aerospace Corporation	Suborbital	Aeronomy	28 August	Successful
28 August; 02:48:30	Third of three launches for TOMEX-Plus.					
17 September	(United States) UGM-133 Trident II		(United States) Ohio-class submarine		United States Navy	
17 September	(United States)	United States Navy	Suborbital	Missile test	17 September	Successful
17 September	Launch 1 of 4.					
18 September; 13:00	(United States) New Shepard	NS-35	(United States) Corn Ranch		(United States) Blue Origin	
18 September; 13:00	(United States) Blue Origin NS-35	Blue Origin	Suborbital	Technology demonstration	18 September	Successful
18 September; 13:00	This was the 12th and final mission for the RSS H.G. Wells Crew Capsule.					
18 September	(United States) UGM-133 Trident II		(United States) Ohio-class submarine		United States Navy	
18 September	(United States)	United States Navy	Suborbital	Missile test	18 September	Successful
18 September	Launch 2 of 4.					
20 September	(United States) UGM-133 Trident II		(United States) Ohio-class submarine		United States Navy	
20 September	(United States)	United States Navy	Suborbital	Missile test	20 September	Successful
20 September	Launch 3 of 4.					
21 September; 23:28	(United States) UGM-133 Trident II		(United States) Ohio-class submarine		United States Navy	
21 September; 23:28	(United States)	United States Navy	Suborbital	Missile test	21 September	Successful
21 September; 23:28	Launch 4 of 4.					
23 September; 00:00	(United States) HASTE	JENNA	(United States) MARS LC-2		(United States) Rocket Lab	
23 September; 00:00	(United States) JENNA	Hypersonix	Suborbital	Technology demonstration	23 September	Successful
23 September; 00:00	Sub-orbital launch under Rocket Lab’s Hypersonic Accelerator Suborbital Test Electron (HASTE) program.					
