= List of spaceflight launches in April–June 2025 =

This article lists orbital and suborbital launches during the second quarter of the year 2025.

For all other spaceflight activities, see 2025 in spaceflight. For launches in the rest of 2025, see List of spaceflight launches in January–March 2025, List of spaceflight launches in July–September 2025, or List of spaceflight launches in October–December 2025.

== Orbital launches ==
- ← Jan
- Feb
- Mar
- Apr
- May
- Jun
- Jul
- Aug
- Sep
- Oct
- Nov
- Dec →

=== April ===
Date and time (UTC)	Rocket	Flight number	Launch site		LSP	
Date and time (UTC)	Payload (⚀ = CubeSat)	Operator	Orbit	Function	Decay (UTC)	Outcome
Date and time (UTC)	Remarks					
1 April; 01:46:50	(United States) Falcon 9 Block 5	F9-454	(United States) Kennedy LC-39A		(United States) SpaceX	
1 April; 01:46:50	(United States) Fram2	SpaceX	Low Earth (Polar)	Private spaceflight Human spaceflight research	4 April; 16:19:28	Successful
1 April; 01:46:50	Crew Dragon orbital flight carrying four civilian passengers for 3.5 days, led by billionaire investor Chun Wang. First crewed spaceflight to a polar orbit. 200th launch from Launch Complex 39A.					
1 April; 04:00	(China) Long March 2D	2D-Y78	(China) Jiuquan SLS-2		(China) CASC	
1 April; 04:00	(China) Hulianwang Jishu Shiyan 6A	CASIC	Low Earth	Communications	In orbit	Operational
1 April; 04:00	(China) Hulianwang Jishu Shiyan 6B	CASIC	Low Earth	Communications	In orbit	Operational
1 April; 04:00	(China) Hulianwang Jishu Shiyan 6C	CASIC	Low Earth	Communications	In orbit	Operational
1 April; 04:00	(China) Hulianwang Jishu Shiyan 6D	CASIC	Low Earth	Communications	In orbit	Operational
1 April; 04:00	It is part of the Guowang (Xingwang) constellation. The satellite are manufactured by Galaxy Space and Chang Guang Satellite Technology.					
3 April; 02:12	(China) Long March 6	Y14	(China) Taiyuan LA-16		(China) CASC	
3 April; 02:12	(China) Tianping 3A-02	CAS	Low Earth	Radar calibration	In orbit	Operational
4 April; 01:02:50	(United States) Falcon 9 Block 5	Starlink Group 11-13	(United States) Vandenberg SLC-4E		(United States) SpaceX	
4 April; 01:02:50	(United States) Starlink × 27	SpaceX	Low Earth	Communications	In orbit	Operational
6 April; 03:07:20	(United States) Falcon 9 Block 5	Starlink Group 6-72	(United States) Cape Canaveral SLC-40		(United States) SpaceX	
6 April; 03:07:20	(United States) Starlink × 28	SpaceX	Low Earth	Communications	In orbit	Operational
7 April; 22:11:20	(United States) Falcon 9 Block 5	Starlink Group 11-11	(United States) Vandenberg SLC-4E		(United States) SpaceX	
7 April; 22:11:20	(United States) Starlink × 27	SpaceX	Low Earth	Communications	In orbit	Operational
8 April; 05:47:15	(Russia) Soyuz-2.1a		(Kazakhstan) Baikonur Site 31/6		(Russia) Roscosmos	
8 April; 05:47:15	(Russia) Soyuz MS-27	Roscosmos	Low Earth (ISS)	Expedition 72/73	In orbit	Docked to ISS
10 April; 16:47	(China) Long March 3B/E	3B-Y107	(China) Xichang LC-3		(China) CASC	
10 April; 16:47	(China) TJS-17	SAST	GTO to GSO	Technology demonstration Communications	In orbit	Operational
10 April; 16:47	(China) 1 Undisclosed satellite	TBA	GTO to GSO	TBA		
12 April; 12:25	(United States) Falcon 9 Block 5	F9-458	(United States) Vandenberg SLC-4E		(United States) SpaceX	
12 April; 12:25	(United States) USA-499 - USA-520 (Starshield Group 1-8)	NRO	Low Earth (SSO)	Reconnaissance	In orbit	Operational
12 April; 12:25	NROL-192 Mission (NRO Proliferated Architecture Mission). Ninth batch of SpaceX/Northrop built 22 Starshield satellites for the National Reconnaissance Office.					
13 April; 00:53:30	(United States) Falcon 9 Block 5	Starlink Group 12-17	(United States) Kennedy LC-39A		(United States) SpaceX	
13 April; 00:53:30	(United States) Starlink × 8	SpaceX	Low Earth	Communications	In orbit	Operational
13 April; 00:53:30	(United States) Starlink-D2C × 13	SpaceX	Low Earth	Communications	In orbit	Operational
14 April; 04:00	(United States) Falcon 9 Block 5	Starlink Group 6-73	(United States) Cape Canaveral SLC-40		(United States) SpaceX	
14 April; 04:00	(United States) Starlink × 27	SpaceX	Low Earth	Communications	In orbit	Operational
14 April; 04:00	B1067 became the first booster to launch for its 27th time.					
16 April; 19:33	(United States) Minotaur IV / Orion 38		(United States) Vandenberg SLC-8		(United States) Northrop Grumman	
16 April; 19:33	(United States) USA-521	NRO	Low Earth	Reconnaissance	In orbit	Operational
16 April; 19:33	(United States) USA-522	NRO	Low Earth	Reconnaissance	In orbit	Operational
16 April; 19:33	NROL-174 mission. This is the first Minotaur IV to launch from Vandenberg since 2011.					
18 April; 22:51	(China) Long March 6A	6A-Y11	(China) Taiyuan LA-9A		(China) CASC	
18 April; 22:51	(China) Shiyan 27A	CAST	Low Earth (SSO)	Technology demonstration	In orbit	Operational
18 April; 22:51	(China) Shiyan 27B	CAST	Low Earth (SSO)	Technology demonstration	In orbit	Operational
18 April; 22:51	(China) Shiyan 27C	CAST	Low Earth (SSO)	Technology demonstration	In orbit	Operational
18 April; 22:51	(China) Shiyan 27D	CAST	Low Earth (SSO)	Technology demonstration	In orbit	Operational
18 April; 22:51	(China) Shiyan 27E	CAST	Low Earth (SSO)	Technology demonstration	In orbit	Operational
18 April; 22:51	(China) Shiyan 27F	CAST	Low Earth (SSO)	Technology demonstration	In orbit	Operational
20 April; 12:29	(United States) Falcon 9 Block 5	F9-461	(United States) Vandenberg SLC-4E		(United States) SpaceX	
20 April; 12:29	(United States) USA-523 - USA-544 (Starshield Group 1-9)	NRO/USSF	Low Earth (SSO)	Reconnaissance	In orbit	Operational
20 April; 12:29	NROL-145 Mission (NRO's Proliferated Architecture Mission). Tenth batch of SpaceX/Northrop built 22 Starshield satellites for the National Reconnaissance Office. First NRO Proliferated Architecture Mission launch in partnership with USSF under the NSSL Phase 3 Lane 1 contract.					
21 April; 08:15:45	(United States) Falcon 9 Block 5	F9-462	(United States) Kennedy LC-39A		(United States) SpaceX	
21 April; 08:15:45	(United States) SpaceX CRS-32	NASA	Low Earth (ISS)	ISS logistics	In orbit	Docked to ISS
21 April; 08:15:45	Dragon will be carrying ESA's ACES experiment in its trunk. ACES consists of two atomic clocks, including CNES' PHARAO and Safran Time Technologies' SHM, other payload is STP-H10.					
22 April; 00:48:33	(United States) Falcon 9 Block 5	Bandwagon-3	(United States) Cape Canaveral SLC-40		(United States) SpaceX	
22 April; 00:48:33	(South Korea) KORSAT-3 (425 Project SAR Sat 3)	DAPA	Low Earth	Reconnaissance	In orbit	Operational
22 April; 00:48:33	(Germany) PHOENIX-I	ATMOS Space Cargo	Low Earth to Transatmospheric	Reentry capsule	22 April	Successful
22 April; 00:48:33	⚀ (United States) Tomorrow S7	Tomorrow.io	Low Earth	Meteorology	In orbit	Operational
22 April; 00:48:33	Dedicated SmallSat Rideshare mission to a 45-degree mid-inclination orbit, designated Bandwagon-3. Fourth of five dedicated launches for DAPA 425 Project (425 Project Flight 4). 300th launch from SLC-40.					
24 April; 09:17:31	(China) Long March 2F/G	2F-Y20	(China) Jiuquan SLS-1		(China) CASC	
24 April; 09:17:31	(China) Shenzhou 20	CMSA	Low Earth (TSS)	Crewed spaceflight	In orbit	Docked to TSS
24 April; 09:17:31	Ninth crewed mission to Tiangong Space Station (TSS).					
25 April; 01:52:40	(United States) Falcon 9 Block 5	Starlink Group 6-74	(United States) Cape Canaveral SLC-40		(United States) SpaceX	
25 April; 01:52:40	(United States) Starlink × 28	SpaceX	Low Earth	Communications	In orbit	Operational
27 April; 15:54	(China) Long March 3B/E	3B-Y109	(China) Xichang LC-2		(China) CASC	
27 April; 15:54	(China) Tianlian-2 05 (Tianlian-2E)	CAST	GTO to GSO	Communications	In orbit	Operational
28 April; 02:09:40	(United States) Falcon 9 Block 5	Starlink Group 12-23	(United States) Cape Canaveral SLC-40		(United States) SpaceX	
28 April; 02:09:40	(United States) Starlink × 10	SpaceX	Low Earth	Communications	In orbit	Operational
28 April; 02:09:40	(United States) Starlink-D2C × 13	SpaceX	Low Earth	Communications	In orbit	Operational
28 April; 20:10	(China) Long March 5B / YZ-2	5B-Y7 / SatNet LEO Group 03	(China) Wenchang LC-1		(China) CASC	
28 April; 20:10	(China) Guowang × 10	CAST	Low Earth	Communications	In orbit	Operational
28 April; 20:10	Third batch of satellites for the 13,000-satellite Guowang (Xingwang) megaconstellation.					
28 April; 20:42:30	(United States) Falcon 9 Block 5	Starlink Group 11-9	(United States) Vandenberg SLC-4E		(United States) SpaceX	
28 April; 20:42:30	(United States) Starlink × 27	SpaceX	Low Earth	Communications	In orbit	Operational
28 April; 23:01	(United States) Atlas V 551	AV-107/Kuiper-1/KA-01	(United States) Cape Canaveral SLC-41		(United States) ULA	
28 April; 23:01	(United States) KuiperSat × 27	Kuiper Systems (Amazon)	Low Earth	Communications	In orbit	Operational
28 April; 23:01	Carrying 27 satellites for Project Kuiper. Second of nine launches on Atlas V after a launch of two test satellites in 2023. This is ULA's first of 46 launches include 38 Vulcan Centaur and 8 Atlas V launches on behalf of Amazon to deploy a majority of the Project Kuiper broadband satellite constellation in low Earth orbit. Heaviest Payload launched by an Atlas V. Mission Designated "Kuiper-1 & Atlas Kuiper Mission #1 (KA-01)"					
29 April; 02:34:10	(United States) Falcon 9 Block 5	Starlink Group 12-10	(United States) Kennedy LC-39A		(United States) SpaceX	
29 April; 02:34:10	(United States) Starlink × 10	SpaceX	Low Earth	Communications	In orbit	Operational
29 April; 02:34:10	(United States) Starlink-D2C × 13	SpaceX	Low Earth	Communications	In orbit	Operational
29 April; 09:15	(Italy) Vega-C	VV26	(France) Kourou ELV		(France) Arianespace	
29 April; 09:15	Biomass	ESA	Low Earth (SSO)	Earth observation	In orbit	Operational
29 April; 09:15	Earth Explorer 7 of the Living Planet Programme.					
29 April; 13:37	(United States) Firefly Alpha	FLTA006	(United States) Vandenberg SLC-2W		(United States) Firefly	
29 April; 13:37	(United States) LM-400 Demo	Lockheed Martin Space	Low Earth	Technology demonstration	29 April	Launch failure
29 April; 13:37	Mission designated "Message In A Booster". First of 15 launches contracted with Lockheed Martin through 2029 with options for 10 more launches. Problem during stage separation and second stage ignition caused disintegration of the separated 1st stage and the loss of the Lightning engine nozzle extension on the 2nd stage, substantially reducing the engine's thrust. 2nd stage reached 320 km in altitude but did not reach orbital velocity, eventually impacted the Pacific Ocean north of Antarctica.					

- ← Jan
- Feb
- Mar
- Apr
- May
- Jun
- Jul
- Aug
- Sep
- Oct
- Nov
- Dec →

=== May ===
Date and time (UTC)	Rocket	Flight number	Launch site		LSP	
Date and time (UTC)	Payload (⚀ = CubeSat)	Operator	Orbit	Function	Decay (UTC)	Outcome
Date and time (UTC)	Remarks					
2 May; 01:51:10	(United States) Falcon 9 Block 5	Starlink Group 6-75	(United States) Cape Canaveral SLC-40		(United States) SpaceX	
2 May; 01:51:10	(United States) Starlink × 28	SpaceX	Low Earth	Communications	In orbit	Operational
4 May; 08:54:40	(United States) Falcon 9 Block 5	Starlink Group 6-84	(United States) Kennedy LC-39A		(United States) SpaceX	
4 May; 08:54:40	(United States) Starlink × 29	SpaceX	Low Earth	Communications	In orbit	Operational
7 May; 01:17:20	(United States) Falcon 9 Block 5	Starlink Group 6-93	(United States) Cape Canaveral SLC-40		(United States) SpaceX	
7 May; 01:17:20	(United States) Starlink × 28	SpaceX	Low Earth	Communications	In orbit	Operational
10 May; 00:19:50	(United States) Falcon 9 Block 5	Starlink Group 15-3	(United States) Vandenberg SLC-4E		(United States) SpaceX	
10 May; 00:19:50	(United States) Starlink × 26	SpaceX	Low Earth	Communications	In orbit	Operational
10 May; 06:28:00	(United States) Falcon 9 Block 5	Starlink Group 6-91	(United States) Cape Canaveral SLC-40		(United States) SpaceX	
10 May; 06:28:00	(United States) Starlink × 28	SpaceX	Low Earth	Communications	In orbit	Operational
11 May; 13:27	(China) Long March 6A	6A-Y9	(China) Taiyuan LA-9A		(China) CASC	
11 May; 13:27	(China) Yaogan 40-02A	CAST	Low Earth (Polar)	Reconnaissance	In orbit	Operational
11 May; 13:27	(China) Yaogan 40-02B	CAST	Low Earth (Polar)	Reconnaissance	In orbit	Operational
11 May; 13:27	(China) Yaogan 40-02C	CAST	Low Earth (Polar)	Reconnaissance	In orbit	Operational
12 May; 18:09	(China) Long March 3C/E	3C-Y19	(China) Xichang LC-3		(China) CASC	
12 May; 18:09	(China) TJS-19	SAST	GTO to GSO	Technology demonstration	In orbit	Operational
13 May; 01:15:10	(United States) Falcon 9 Block 5	Starlink Group 15-4	(United States) Vandenberg SLC-4E		(United States) SpaceX	
13 May; 01:15:10	(United States) Starlink × 26	SpaceX	Low Earth	Communications	In orbit	Operational
13 May; 05:02:20	(United States) Falcon 9 Block 5	Starlink Group 6-83	(United States) Kennedy LC-39A		(United States) SpaceX	
13 May; 05:02:20	(United States) Starlink × 28	SpaceX	Low Earth	Communications	In orbit	Operational
13 May; 05:02:20	B1067 became the first booster to launch for its 28th time.					
14 May; 04:12	(China) Long March 2D	2D-Y107	(China) Jiuquan SLS-2		(China) CASC	
14 May; 04:12	(China) Taikong Jisuan 01 (Xingshidai 37/Zhijiang 1)	ADASPACE	Low Earth (SSO)	TBA	In orbit	Operational
14 May; 04:12	(China) Taikong Jisuan 02 (Xingshidai 38/Zhijiang 2)	ADASPACE	Low Earth (SSO)	TBA	In orbit	Operational
14 May; 04:12	(China) Taikong Jisuan 03 (Xingshidai 27/Neijiang)	ADASPACE	Low Earth (SSO)	TBA	In orbit	Operational
14 May; 04:12	(China) Taikong Jisuan 04 (Xingshidai 28/Neijiang Gaoxin)	ADASPACE	Low Earth (SSO)	TBA	In orbit	Operational
14 May; 04:12	(China) Taikong Jisuan 05 (Xingshidai 29/Taizhou)	ADASPACE	Low Earth (SSO)	TBA	In orbit	Operational
14 May; 04:12	(China) Taikong Jisuan 06 (Xingshidai 30/Haikou)	ADASPACE	Low Earth (SSO)	TBA	In orbit	Operational
14 May; 04:12	(China) Taikong Jisuan 07 (Xingshidai 31/Maanshan Zhisuan 1)	ADASPACE	Low Earth (SSO)	TBA	In orbit	Operational
14 May; 04:12	(China) Taikong Jisuan 08 (Xingshidai 32/Chongzhou)	ADASPACE	Low Earth (SSO)	TBA	In orbit	Operational
14 May; 04:12	(China) Taikong Jisuan 09 (Xingshidai 33/Tiantie Keji)	ADASPACE	Low Earth (SSO)	TBA	In orbit	Operational
14 May; 04:12	(China) Taikong Jisuan 10 (Xingshidai 34/Miyan Wuliaoyuan)	ADASPACE	Low Earth (SSO)	TBA	In orbit	Operational
14 May; 04:12	(China) Taikong Jisuan 11 (Xingshidai 35/Yukongzhe)	ADASPACE	Low Earth (SSO)	TBA	In orbit	Operational
14 May; 04:12	(China) Taikong Jisuan 12 (Xingshidai 36/Dalinghaowan)	ADASPACE	Low Earth (SSO)	TBA	In orbit	Operational
14 May; 04:12	Taikong Jisuan Xingzuo (Space Computing Constellation)					
14 May; 16:38:50	(United States) Falcon 9 Block 5	Starlink Group 6-67	(United States) Cape Canaveral SLC-40		(United States) SpaceX	
14 May; 16:38:50	(United States) Starlink × 28	SpaceX	Low Earth	Communications	In orbit	Operational
16 May; 13:43:50	(United States) Falcon 9 Block 5	Starlink Group 15-5	(United States) Vandenberg SLC-4E		(United States) SpaceX	
16 May; 13:43:50	(United States) Starlink × 26	SpaceX	Low Earth	Communications	In orbit	Operational
17 May; 04:12	(China) Zhuque-2E	Y2	(China) Jiuquan LS-96		(China) LandSpace	
17 May; 04:12	(China) Tianyi 29 (Dizhi-1)	SpaceTY	Low Earth (SSO)	TBA	In orbit	Operational
17 May; 04:12	(China) Tianyi 34 (Nankeda-1)	SpaceTY	Low Earth (SSO)	TBA	In orbit	Operational
17 May; 04:12	(China) Tianyi 35 (Nanchang Hangkong-1)	SpaceTY	Low Earth (SSO)	TBA	In orbit	Operational
17 May; 04:12	(China) Tianyi 42 (Shenqi-2)	SpaceTY	Low Earth (SSO)	TBA	In orbit	Operational
17 May; 04:12	(China) Tianyi 45 (Beiyou-2)	SpaceTY	Low Earth (SSO)	TBA	In orbit	Operational
17 May; 04:12	(China) Tianyi 46 (Beiyou-3)	SpaceTY	Low Earth (SSO)	TBA	In orbit	Operational
17 May; 08:15	(United States) Electron	"The Sea God Sees"	(New Zealand) Mahia LC-1A		(United States) Rocket Lab	
17 May; 08:15	(Japan) QPS-SAR 10 (WADATSUMI-I)	iQPS	Low Earth	Earth observation	In orbit	Operational
17 May; 08:15	Second of eight dedicated launches to support the build out of iQPS’ planned constellation of 36 synthetic aperture radar (SAR) satellites.					
18 May; 00:29	(India) PSLV-XL	C61	(India) Satish Dhawan FLP		(India) ISRO	
18 May; 00:29	(India) EOS-09 (RISAT-1B)	ISRO	Low Earth (SSO)	Earth observation	18 May	Launch failure
18 May; 00:29	Follow-On to RISAT-1A Satellite. 3rd stage failure during burn.					
19 May; 07:38	(China) Ceres-1S	Y5	(China) Dong Fang Hang Tian Gang platform, Yellow Sea		(China) Galactic Energy	
19 May; 07:38	(China) Tianqi 16, 17, 18, 20	Guodian Gaoke	Low Earth	IoT	In orbit	Operational
20 May; 11:50	(China) Long March 7A	7A-Y15	(China) Wenchang LC-2		(China) CASC	
20 May; 11:50	(China) ChinaSat 3B (Feng Huo 3B)	China Satcom	GTO to GSO	Communications	In orbit	Operational
21 May; 03:19:10	(United States) Falcon 9 Block 5	Starlink Group 12-15	(United States) Cape Canaveral SLC-40		(United States) SpaceX	
21 May; 03:19:10	(United States) Starlink × 10	SpaceX	Low Earth	Communications	In orbit	Operational
21 May; 03:19:10	(United States) Starlink-D2C × 13	SpaceX	Low Earth	Communications	In orbit	Operational
21 May; 04:05	(China) Kinetica 1	Y7	(China) Jiuquan LS-130		(China) CAS Space	
21 May; 04:05	(China) Taijing-3 04 (Stilsat 1)	MinoSpace	Low Earth (SSO)	Earth observation	In orbit	Operational
21 May; 04:05	(China) Taijing-4 02A	MinoSpace	Low Earth (SSO)	Earth observation	In orbit	Operational
21 May; 04:05	(China) Lifangti-108 001 (Tada Huyang 1)	Tarim University / Future Aerospace	Low Earth (SSO)	Earth observation	In orbit	Operational
21 May; 04:05	(China) Xingjiyuan-1	SpaceRobot / Lanyue Electromechanical	Low Earth (SSO)	Earth observation	In orbit	Operational
21 May; 04:05	(China) Xingrui-11 (Beiligong Zhuhai 01)	BIT / Setret Space Technology	Low Earth (SSO)	Earth observation	In orbit	Operational
21 May; 04:05	(China) Xiguang-1 02 (Tanli)	Zhongke Xiguang Aerospace	Low Earth (SSO)	Earth observation	In orbit	Operational
21 May; 04:05	Return to flight of Kinetica 1 after a launch failure on 27 December 2024.					
23 May; 08:36	(Russia) Soyuz-2.1b / Fregat-M		(Russia) Plesetsk Site 43/4		(Russia) RVSN RF	
23 May; 08:36	(Russia) Kosmos 2588 (Nivelir-L №5)	VKS	Low Earth	Space surveillance	In orbit	Operational
23 May; 22:32:20	(United States) Falcon 9 Block 5	Starlink Group 11-16	(United States) Vandenberg SLC-4E		(United States) SpaceX	
23 May; 22:32:20	(United States) Starlink × 27	SpaceX	Low Earth	Communications	In orbit	Operational
24 May; 17:19:10	(United States) Falcon 9 Block 5	Starlink Group 12-22	(United States) Cape Canaveral SLC-40		(United States) SpaceX	
24 May; 17:19:10	(United States) Starlink × 10	SpaceX	Low Earth	Communications	In orbit	Operational
24 May; 17:19:10	(United States) Starlink-D2C × 13	SpaceX	Low Earth	Communications	In orbit	Operational
27 May; 16:57:15	(United States) Falcon 9 Block 5	Starlink Group 17-1	(United States) Vandenberg SLC-4E		(United States) SpaceX	
27 May; 16:57:15	(United States) Starlink × 24	SpaceX	Low Earth (SSO)	Communications	In orbit	Operational
27 May; 16:57:15	First launch of Starlink Group 17 Satellites. First Starlink launch to a SSO inclination (nearly directly south) in over 2 years since the launch of Starlink Group 3-5 on 27 April 2023.					
28 May; 13:30:00	(United States) Falcon 9 Block 5	Starlink Group 10-32	(United States) Kennedy LC-39A		(United States) SpaceX	
28 May; 13:30:00	(United States) Starlink × 27	SpaceX	Low Earth	Communications	In orbit	Operational
28 May; 17:31	(China) Long March 3B/E	3B-Y110	(China) Xichang LC-2		(China) CASC	
28 May; 17:31	(China) Tianwen-2	CNSA	Heliocentric	Asteroid sample-return Comet orbiter	In orbit	En route
28 May; 17:31	Formerly known as ZhengHe. It will travel to near Earth asteroid 469219 Kamoʻoalewa (2016 HO_{3}). it then travel to 311P/PanSTARRS, a comet-like asteroid, which it will reach in 2034.					
29 May; 04:12	(China) Long March 4B	4B-Y62	(China) Jiuquan SLS-2		(China) CASC	
29 May; 04:12	(China) Shijian 26	CAST	Low Earth (SSO)	Earth observation	In orbit	Operational
30 May; 17:37:59	(United States) Falcon 9 Block 5	F9-482	(United States) Cape Canaveral SLC-40		(United States) SpaceX	
30 May; 17:37:59	(United States) GPS III-08 Katherine Johnson (USA-545)	U.S. Space Force	Medium Earth	Navigation	In orbit	Operational
30 May; 17:37:59	Named after NASA mathematician and human computer Katherine Johnson. GPS III-08, originally scheduled to launch on a ULA Vulcan rocket, was reassigned to the Falcon 9. As a result, GPS IIIF-1, originally planned to launch on a Falcon Heavy, will now launch on Vulcan.					
31 May; 20:10:00	(United States) Falcon 9 Block 5	Starlink Group 11-18	(United States) Vandenberg SLC-4E		(United States) SpaceX	
31 May; 20:10:00	(United States) Starlink × 27	SpaceX	Low Earth	Communications	In orbit	Operational

- ← Jan
- Feb
- Mar
- Apr
- May
- Jun
- Jul
- Aug
- Sep
- Oct
- Nov
- Dec →

=== June ===
Date and time (UTC)	Rocket	Flight number	Launch site		LSP	
Date and time (UTC)	Payload (⚀ = CubeSat)	Operator	Orbit	Function	Decay (UTC)	Outcome
Date and time (UTC)	Remarks					
2 June; 23:57	(United States) Electron	"Full Stream Ahead"	(New Zealand) Mahia LC-1B		(United States) Rocket Lab	
2 June; 23:57	(United States) BlackSky Global 3-2 (BlackSky 21)	BlackSky Global	Low Earth (SSO)	Earth observation	In orbit	Operational
2 June; 23:57	Second of five dedicated launches for BlackSky's 3rd generation satellites.					
3 June; 04:43:30	(United States) Falcon 9 Block 5	Starlink Group 12-19	(United States) Cape Canaveral SLC-40		(United States) SpaceX	
3 June; 04:43:30	(United States) Starlink × 10	SpaceX	Low Earth	Communications	In orbit	Operational
3 June; 04:43:30	(United States) Starlink-D2C × 13	SpaceX	Low Earth	Communications	In orbit	Operational
3 June; 04:43:30	500th launch within the Falcon family, consisting of 5 Falcon 1, 11 Falcon Heavy, and now 484 Falcon 9 launches.					
4 June; 23:40:30	(United States) Falcon 9 Block 5	Starlink Group 11-22	(United States) Vandenberg SLC-4E		(United States) SpaceX	
4 June; 23:40:30	(United States) Starlink × 27	SpaceX	Low Earth	Communications	In orbit	Operational
5 June; 20:45	(China) Long March 6A	6A-Y8 / SatNet LEO Group 04	(China) Taiyuan LA-9A		(China) CASC	
5 June; 20:45	(China) Guowang × 5	CAST/SECM	Low Earth (Polar)	Communications	In orbit	Operational
5 June; 20:45	Fourth batch of satellites for the 13,000-satellite Guowang (Xingwang) megaconstellation.					
7 June; 04:54	(United States) Falcon 9 Block 5	F9-486	(United States) Cape Canaveral SLC-40		(United States) SpaceX	
7 June; 04:54	(United States) SXM-10	SiriusXM	GTO to GSO	Communications	In orbit	Operational
8 June; 14:20:10	(United States) Falcon 9 Block 5	Starlink Group 15-8	(United States) Vandenberg SLC-4E		(United States) SpaceX	
8 June; 14:20:10	(United States) Starlink × 26	SpaceX	Low Earth	Communications	In orbit	Operational
10 June; 13:05:40	(United States) Falcon 9 Block 5	Starlink Group 12-24	(United States) Cape Canaveral SLC-40		(United States) SpaceX	
10 June; 13:05:40	(United States) Starlink × 10	SpaceX	Low Earth	Communications	In orbit	Operational
10 June; 13:05:40	(United States) Starlink-D2C × 13	SpaceX	Low Earth	Communications	In orbit	Operational
11 June; 15:31	(United States) Electron	"The Mountain God Guards"	(New Zealand) Mahia LC-1A		(United States) Rocket Lab	
11 June; 15:31	(Japan) QPS-SAR 11 (YAMATSUMI-I)	iQPS	Low Earth (SSO)	Earth observation	In orbit	Operational
11 June; 15:31	Third of eight dedicated launches to support the build out of iQPS’ planned constellation of 36 synthetic aperture radar (SAR) satellites.					
13 June; 01:54:50	(United States) Falcon 9 Block 5	Starlink Group 15-6	(United States) Vandenberg SLC-4E		(United States) SpaceX	
13 June; 01:54:50	(United States) Starlink × 26	SpaceX	Low Earth	Communications	In orbit	Operational
13 June; 01:54:50	500th successful launch within the Falcon family, consisting of 2 Falcon 1, 11 Falcon Heavy, and now 487 Falcon 9 launches. Overall there have been 506 Falcon launches, including 3 failures of Falcon 1, 2 failures and 1 partial failure of Falcon 9.					
13 June; 15:29:00	(United States) Falcon 9 Block 5	Starlink Group 12-26	(United States) Cape Canaveral SLC-40		(United States) SpaceX	
13 June; 15:29:00	(United States) Starlink × 10	SpaceX	Low Earth	Communications	In orbit	Operational
13 June; 15:29:00	(United States) Starlink-D2C × 13	SpaceX	Low Earth	Communications	In orbit	Operational
14 June; 07:56	(China) Long March 2D	2D-Y42	(China) Jiuquan SLS-2		(China) CASC	
14 June; 07:56	(China) (Italy) CSES-02 / Zhangheng 1-02	CNSA / ASI	Low Earth (SSO)	Ionospheric research	In orbit	Operational
14 June; 07:56	Second CSES-Limadou satellite mission.					
17 June; 03:36:50	(United States) Falcon 9 Block 5	Starlink Group 15-9	(United States) Vandenberg SLC-4E		(United States) SpaceX	
17 June; 03:36:50	(United States) Starlink × 26	SpaceX	Low Earth	Communications	In orbit	Operational
17 June; 03:36:50	200th launch from SLC-4E.					
18 June; 06:30	(United States) Falcon 9 Block 5	Starlink Group 10-18	(United States) Cape Canaveral SLC-40		(United States) SpaceX	
18 June; 06:30	(United States) Starlink × 28	SpaceX	Low Earth	Communications	In orbit	Operational
19 June; 03:01:20	(Russia) Angara A5 / Briz-M		(Russia) Plesetsk Site 35/1		(Russia) RVSN RF	
19 June; 03:01:20	(Russia) Kosmos 2589 (14F166A №1)	VKS	Geosynchronous	TBA	In orbit	Operational
19 June; 03:01:20	(Russia) Kosmos 2590 (14F166A Subsat 1)	VKS	Geosynchronous	TBA	In orbit	Operational
19 June; 03:01:20	First operational launch of Angara A5. A new long fairing is used in this launch.					
20 June; 12:37	(China) Long March 3B/E	3B-Y111	(China) Xichang LC-2		(China) CASC	
20 June; 12:37	(China) ChinaSat 9C	China Satcom	GTO to Geosynchronous	Communications	In orbit	Operational
20 June; 12:37	ChinaSat 9C will replace ChinaSat 9.					
23 June; 05:58:30	(United States) Falcon 9 Block 5	Starlink Group 10-23	(United States) Cape Canaveral SLC-40		(United States) SpaceX	
23 June; 05:58:30	(United States) Starlink × 27	SpaceX	Low Earth	Communications	In orbit	Operational
23 June; 10:54:30	(United States) Atlas V 551	AV-105/KA-02/Kuiper-2	(United States) Cape Canaveral SLC-41		(United States) ULA	
23 June; 10:54:30	(United States) KuiperSat × 27	Kuiper Systems (Amazon)	Low Earth	Communications	In orbit	Operational
23 June; 10:54:30	Third of nine Project Kuiper launches on Atlas V.					
23 June; 21:25:30	(United States) Falcon 9 Block 5	Transporter-14	(United States) Vandenberg SLC-4E		(United States) SpaceX	
23 June; 21:25:30	(United States) Acadia-7 (Capella-17)	Capella Space	Low Earth (SSO)	Earth observation	In orbit	Operational
23 June; 21:25:30	(Norway) ARVAKER-II,III (N3X 2,3)	Kongsberg Defence and Aerospace	Low Earth (SSO)	Technology demonstration	In orbit	Operational
23 June; 21:25:30	(Denmark) (Sweden) BIFROST	Space Inventor	Low Earth (SSO)	Earth observation	In orbit	Operational
23 June; 21:25:30	(United Kingdom) ForgeStar 1	Space Forge	Low Earth (SSO)	Space manufacturing	In orbit	Operational
23 June; 21:25:30	(Canada) GHGSat-C12 Pierre	GHGSat	Low Earth (SSO)	Earth observation	In orbit	Operational
23 June; 21:25:30	(Canada) GHGSat-C13 Valmay	GHGSat	Low Earth (SSO)	Earth observation	In orbit	Operational
23 June; 21:25:30	(Japan) GRUS-3α	Axelspace	Low Earth (SSO)	Earth observation	In orbit	Operational
23 June; 21:25:30	(Finland) ICEYE X52-X57	ICEYE	Low Earth (SSO)	Earth observation	In orbit	Operational
23 June; 21:25:30	(Spain) IOD-2	Startical	Low Earth (SSO)	Air traffic management	In orbit	Operational
23 June; 21:25:30	(Italy) ION SCV-018 Passionate Paola	D-Orbit	Low Earth (SSO)	Space Tug	In orbit	Operational
23 June; 21:25:30	(Italy) ION SCV-020 Charismatic Carlus	D-Orbit	Low Earth (SSO)	Space Tug	In orbit	Operational
23 June; 21:25:30	(Italy) IRIDE-MS2-HEO 2-6,8,9	ASI/Argotec	Low Earth (SSO)	Earth observation	In orbit	Operational
23 June; 21:25:30	(United States) Lyra Block-1 3 (Lyra-3)	EchoStar	Low Earth (SSO)	Communications	In orbit	Operational
23 June; 21:25:30	(France) (Germany) Mission Possible	The Exploration Company	Low Earth (SSO)	Technology demonstration / Reentry capsule	23 June 2025	Partial failure
23 June; 21:25:30	(Australia) MMS-1 (ElaraSat-1)	Gilmour Space	Low Earth (SSO)	Technology demonstration	In orbit	Operational
23 June; 21:25:30	(United States) Otter Pup 2	Starfish Space	Low Earth (SSO)	Satellite docking	In orbit	Operational
23 June; 21:25:30	(United States) Pulsar 0 (Xona IOV)	Xona Space Systems	Low Earth (SSO)	Technology demonstration / Navigation	In orbit	Operational
23 June; 21:25:30	(Germany) SkyBee-A02	constellr	Low Earth (SSO)	Earth observation	In orbit	Operational
23 June; 21:25:30	(United States) T1DES (Dragoon)	SDA	Low Earth	Technology demonstration	In orbit	Operational
23 June; 21:25:30	(United States) VanZyl-2 (MuSat-3)	Hydrosat / Muon Space	Low Earth (SSO)	Earth observation	In orbit	Operational
23 June; 21:25:30	(United States) W-4 (Winnebago-4)	Varda Space Industries	Low Earth (SSO)	Reentry capsule	In orbit	Operational
23 June; 21:25:30	(United States) EarthDaily-1 (YAM 10)	EarthDaily / Loft Orbital	Low Earth (SSO)	Earth observation	In orbit	Operational
23 June; 21:25:30	⚀ (South Korea) ADDCUBE	Nara Space	Low Earth (SSO)	Earth observation	In orbit	Operational
23 June; 21:25:30	⚀ (Japan) AE2a	ArkEdge Space	Low Earth (SSO)	Earth observation	In orbit	Operational
23 June; 21:25:30	⚀ (Japan) AE3Va	ArkEdge Space	Low Earth (SSO)	Communications	In orbit	Operational
23 June; 21:25:30	⚀ (United States) ARCSTONE	NASA	Low Earth (SSO)	Lunar calibration	In orbit	Operational
23 June; 21:25:30	⚀ (France) BRO-18	UnseenLabs	Low Earth (SSO)	SIGINT	In orbit	Operational
23 June; 21:25:30	⚀ (Turkey) Connecta IoT-9, 10, 11, 12	Plan-S	Low Earth (SSO)	IoT	In orbit	Operational
23 June; 21:25:30	⚀ (Greece) DUTHSat-2	Democritus University of Thrace	Low Earth (SSO)	Technology demonstration / Earth observation	In orbit	Operational
23 June; 21:25:30	⚀ (Spain) (Switzerland) FOSSASAT 2E21 (WiseSat-4)	FOSSA Systems / WISeSat	Low Earth (SSO)	IoT	In orbit	Operational
23 June; 21:25:30	⚀ (United States) Good Ancestors Kilakila	Good Ancestor Foundation	Low Earth (SSO)	Amateur radio	In orbit	Operational
23 June; 21:25:30	⚀ (United States) HORIS-1, 2	MyRadar	Low Earth (SSO)	Technology demonstration	In orbit	Operational
23 June; 21:25:30	⚀ (United States) Hubble 4, 5 (Shaggy, Scooby) (Lemur-2)	Hubble Network / Spire Global	Low Earth (SSO)	Communications	In orbit	Operational
23 June; 21:25:30	⚀ (United States) (Bulgaria) Hubble 6, 7 (Lilo, Stitch)	Hubble Network / EnduroSat	Low Earth (SSO)	Communications	In orbit	Operational
23 June; 21:25:30	⚀ (Finland) Hyperfield 1B	Kuva Space	Low Earth (SSO)	Earth observation	In orbit	Operational
23 June; 21:25:30	⚀ (South Korea) JACK 001	Cosmoworks	Low Earth (SSO)	Earth observation	In orbit	Operational
23 June; 21:25:30	⚀ (United Kingdom) (United States) LacunaSat 4A, 4B (Lemur-2)	Lacuna Space / Spire Global	Low Earth	IoT	In orbit	Operational
23 June; 21:25:30	⚀ (United States) Lemur-2 (Krish)	Spire Global	Low Earth (SSO)	IoT	In orbit	Operational
23 June; 21:25:30	⚀ (Canada) MÖBIUS-1	Galaxia	Low Earth (SSO)	Software-Defined Satellite (SDS)	In orbit	Operational
23 June; 21:25:30	⚀ (United States) (France) (Switzerland) PADRE	UCB / GSFC / SwRI / FHNW / CEA Paris-Saclay	Low Earth (SSO)	X-ray astronomy	In orbit	Operational
23 June; 21:25:30	⚀ (Taiwan) PARUS-T2	TASA	Low Earth (SSO)	APRS/ADCS	In orbit	Operational
23 June; 21:25:30	⚀ (Germany) QUICK³ (TUBSAT-32)	Technische Universität Berlin	Low Earth (SSO)	Technology demonstration	In orbit	Operational
23 June; 21:25:30	⚀ (Indonesia) RIDU-Sat 1	Republic of Indonesia Defense University	Low Earth (SSO)	APRS	In orbit	Operational
23 June; 21:25:30	⚀ (Spain) SATMAR	Alén Space	Low Earth (SSO)	Technology demonstration	In orbit	Operational
23 June; 21:25:30	⚀ (Singapore) Satoro-T3	SATORO Space	Low Earth (SSO)	TBA	In orbit	Operational
23 June; 21:25:30	⚀ (South Korea) (United States) Sejong-2 (Lemur-2)	Hancom InSpace / Spire Global	Low Earth (SSO)	Earth observation	In orbit	Operational
23 June; 21:25:30	⚀ (United States) Time Flies	TrustPoint	Low Earth (SSO)	Navigation	In orbit	Operational
23 June; 21:25:30	⚀ (New Zealand) TPA-1	University of Auckland	Low Earth (SSO)	Technology demonstration	In orbit	Operational
23 June; 21:25:30	⚀ (United States) UND ROADS 1, 2	University of North Dakota	Low Earth (SSO)	Satellite docking	In orbit	Operational
23 June; 21:25:30	Dedicated SmallSat Rideshare mission to sun-synchronous orbit, designated Transporter-14. The ELaNa-56 mission, consisting of the ARCSTONE cubesat, was launched on this flight. First of 12 Satellite launch for the Space Development Agency's Tranche 1 Demonstration and Experimentation System (Tranche 1 DES Mission).					
25 June; 06:31:52	(United States) Falcon 9 Block 5	F9-495	(United States) Kennedy LC-39A		(United States) SpaceX	
25 June; 06:31:52	(United States) Ax-4	SpaceX / Axiom Space	Low Earth (ISS)	Private spaceflight	15 July; 09:31:41	Successful
25 June; 06:31:52	Axiom Mission 4, launching on Crew Dragon. 14-day commercial flight of four astronauts to the International Space Station.					
25 June; 19:54:50	(United States) Falcon 9 Block 5	Starlink Group 10-16	(United States) Cape Canaveral SLC-40		(United States) SpaceX	
25 June; 19:54:50	(United States) Starlink × 27	SpaceX	Low Earth	Communications	In orbit	Operational
26 June; 17:28	(United States) Electron	"Get The Hawk Outta Here"	(New Zealand) Mahia LC-1A		(United States) Rocket Lab	
26 June; 17:28	(United States) Hawk 12A,B,C	HawkEye 360	Low Earth (SSO)	SIGINT	In orbit	Operational
26 June; 17:28	⚀ (United States) Kestrel-0A	HawkEye 360	Low Earth (SSO)	Technology demonstration	In orbit	Operational
26 June; 17:28	Second of three dedicated launches for HawkEye 360.					
27 June; 04:26:00	(United States) Falcon 9 Block 5	Starlink Group 10-34	(United States) Cape Canaveral SLC-40		(United States) SpaceX	
27 June; 04:26:00	(United States) Starlink × 27	SpaceX	Low Earth	Communications	In orbit	Operational
28 June; 07:08	(United States) Electron	"Symphony In The Stars"	(New Zealand) Mahia LC-1B		(United States) Rocket Lab	
28 June; 07:08	(United States) Lyra-4 (Lyra Block-1 4)	EchoStar	Low Earth (SSO)	Communications	In orbit	Operational
28 June; 07:08	First of two dedicated missions on Electron to deploy a single spacecraft to a 650km circular Earth orbit for a confidential commercial customer. Two Electron launches from the same launch complex in Mahia after 37h of the last launch with the "Get The Hawk Outta Here" mission from LC-1A, and a new record among Electron missions.					
28 June; 16:33:03	(Japan) H-IIA 202	F50	(Japan) Tanegashima LA-Y1		(Japan) MHI	
28 June; 16:33:03	(Japan) GOSAT-GW (Ibuki GW)	JAXA	Low Earth (SSO)	Earth observation	In orbit	Operational
28 June; 16:33:03	Final flight of H-IIA, and H-II family as a whole. GOSAT-GW is a successor to the GCOM-W (Shizuku) and the GOSAT-2 (Ibuki 2) satellites.					
28 June; 17:13:00	(United States) Falcon 9 Block 5	Starlink Group 15-7	(United States) Vandenberg SLC-4E		(United States) SpaceX	
28 June; 17:13:00	(United States) Starlink × 26	SpaceX	Low Earth	Communications	In orbit	Operational
← Jan; Feb; Mar; Apr; May; Jun; Jul; Aug; Sep; Oct; Nov; Dec →
For flights after 30 June, see 2025 in spaceflight (July–December)

== Suborbital flights ==
Date and time (UTC)	Rocket	Flight number	Launch site		LSP	
Date and time (UTC)	Payload (⚀ = CubeSat)	Operator	Orbit	Function	Decay (UTC)	Outcome
Date and time (UTC)	Remarks					
8 April; 08:00	(Netherlands) T-minus DART		(Sweden) Esrange		(Netherlands) T-minus Engineering	
8 April; 08:00	(Sweden) PRIME 2?	KTH ?	Suborbital	Technology demonstration	8 April	Successful
13 April	(Iran) Emad, Ghadr-110, Kheibar Shekan, Shahab-3B missiles x120		(Iran)		(Iran)	
13 April	(Iran)	(Iran)	Suborbital	Weapon	13 April	Successful (most intercepted)
13 April	120 missiles launched from Iran to Israel					
14 April; 13:30:00	(United States) New Shepard	NS-31	(United States) Corn Ranch		(United States) Blue Origin	
14 April; 13:30:00	(United States) Blue Origin NS-31	Blue Origin	Suborbital	Space tourism	14 April	Successful
14 April; 13:30:00	Eleventh crewed New Shepard flight. Crew of six. First all-female spaceflight since Vostok 6. Apogee: 107 km (66 mi)					
18 April; 19:03	(New Zealand) Meraki		(New Zealand) Mount White Station		(New Zealand) NZ Rocketry Association	
18 April; 19:03	(New Zealand) Meraki 2	NZ Rocketry Association	Suborbital	Amateur	18 April	Successful
18 April; 19:03	Apogee: 122 km (76 mi). First NZ amateur rocket to reach space.					
25 April; 12:05	(United States) Long-Range Hypersonic Weapon		(United States) Cape Canaveral SLC-46		United States Army / United States Navy	
25 April; 12:05	(United States) Common-Hypersonic Glide Body (C-HGB)	United States Army / United States Navy	Suborbital	Missile test	25 April	Successful
25 April; 12:05	Second live-fire event for the Long-Range Hypersonic Weapon also known as Dark Eagle					
8 May; 00:20	(North Korea) Hwasong-11A		(North Korea) Wonsan		(North Korea) KPA Strategic Force	
8 May; 00:20	(North Korea) Reentry vehicle	KPA Strategic Force	Suborbital	Missile test	8 May	Successful
8 May; 00:20	Apogee: ~100 km (62 mi).					
21 May; 07:01	(United States) Minuteman III	GT-253GM	(United States) Vandenberg LF-10		(United States) AFGSC	
21 May; 07:01	(United States)	AFGSC	Suborbital	Test flight	21 May	Successful
21 May; 07:01	Re-entered ~4,200 mi (6,800 km) downrange near Kwajalein Atoll.					
27 May; 23:36:28	(United States) Starship	Flight 9	(United States) Starbase OLP-A		(United States) SpaceX	
27 May; 23:36:28	(United States) Starlink simulators × 8	SpaceX	Transatmospheric	Flight test	27 May	Failure
27 May; 23:36:28	Ninth Starship orbital test flight. Flight 9 features the first reflight of a Super Heavy booster, Booster 14 (B14), which previously launched Flight 7. Of the 33 engines on the booster, 29 were flight-proven.					
31 May; 13:39:11	(United States) New Shepard	NS-32	(United States) Corn Ranch		(United States) Blue Origin	
31 May; 13:39:11	(United States) Blue Origin NS-32	Blue Origin	Suborbital	Space tourism	31 May	Successful
31 May; 13:39:11	Twelfth crewed New Shepard flight. Crew of six. Apogee: 104 km (65 mi)					
13 June; 13:00	(United States) Spyder	Spyder-1	(United States) White Sands Missile Range LC-36		(United States) UP Aerospace	
13 June; 13:00	(United States)	Los Alamos National Laboratory	Suborbital	Test flight	13 June	Successful
13 June; 13:00	First flight of Spyder, single stage variant.					
13 June	(Iran) Ballistic Missile x150		(Iran)		(Iran)	
13 June	(Iran)	(Iran)	Suborbital	Weapon	13 June	Successful (most intercepted)
13 June	150 missiles launched from Iran to Israel					
13 June	(Yemen)		(Yemen)		(Yemen) Houthis	
13 June	(Yemen) Live warhead	Houthis	Suborbital	Missile launch	13 June	Successful
13 June	Targeted Israel.					
14 June	(Iran) Ballistic Missile x200		(Iran)		(Iran)	
14 June	(Iran)	(Iran)	Suborbital	Weapon	14 June	Successful (most intercepted)
14 June	200 missiles launched from Iran to Israel					
15 June	(Yemen) Palestine 2		(Yemen)		(Yemen) Houthis	
15 June	(Yemen) Live warhead	Houthis	Suborbital	Missile launch	15 June	Intercepted
15 June	Targeted Israel.					
15 June	(Iran) Ballistic Missile x50		(Iran)		(Iran)	
15 June	(Iran)	(Iran)	Suborbital	Weapon	15 June	Successful (most intercepted)
15 June	50 missiles launched from Iran to Israel					
16 June	(Iran) Ballistic Missile x40		(Iran)		(Iran)	
16 June	(Iran)	(Iran)	Suborbital	Weapon	16 June	Successful (few intercepted)
16 June	40 missiles launched from Iran to Israel					
17 June	(Iran) Ballistic Missile x20		(Iran)		(Iran)	
17 June	(Iran)	(Iran)	Suborbital	Weapon	17 June	Successful (most intercepted)
17 June	20 missiles launched from Iran to Israel					
18 June	(Iran) Sejjil		(Iran)		(Iran)	
18 June	(Iran)	(Iran)	Suborbital	Weapon	18 June	Successful
18 June	Single missile launched from Iran to Israel. Wounded one person.					
19 June	(Iran) Ballistic missile x30		(Iran)		(Iran)	
19 June	(Iran)	(Iran)	Suborbital	Weapon	19 June	Successful (most intercepted)
19 June	30 missiles launched from Iran to Israel in two salvos.					
20 June; 08:27	(United States) Terrier-Improved Malemute	NASA 46.026UE	(Marshall Islands) Reagan Test Site		(United States) NASA	
20 June; 08:27	(United States) SEED	ERAU	Suborbital	Sporadic E observations	20 June 2025	Successful
20 June; 08:27	Sporadic E Electrodynamics (SEED). First of two launches.					
20 June	(Iran) Ballistic Missile x25		(Iran)		(Iran)	
20 June	(Iran)	(Iran)	Suborbital	Weapon	20 June	Successful (most intercepted)
20 June	25 missiles launched from Iran to Israel					
22 June	(Iran) Ballistic Missile x27		(Iran)		(Iran)	
22 June	(Iran)	(Iran)	Suborbital	Weapon	22 June	Successful (most intercepted)
22 June	27 missiles launched from Iran to Israel					
23 June	(Iran) Ballistic Missile x14		(Iran)		(Iran)	
23 June	(Iran)	(Iran)	Suborbital	Weapon	23 June	13 intercepted, 1 impacted off target
23 June	14 missiles launched from Iran to Qatar					
24 June	(Iran) Ballistic Missile x20		(Iran)		(Iran)	
24 June	(Iran)	(Iran)	Suborbital	Weapon	20 June	Successful (most intercepted)
24 June	27 missiles launched from Iran to Israel					
24 June	(United States) ICBM-T3 ?	FTX-26a	(United States) Boeing C-17 Globemaster III, Pacific Ocean		(United States) MDA	
24 June	(United States)	MDA	Suborbital	Missile target	24 June	Successful
24 June	Flight Test Other-26a (FTX-26a) of the Aegis Ballistic Missile Defense System, tracked target for the first use of the Long Range Discrimination Radar (LRDR) at Clear Space Force Station, Alaska.					
26 June; 09:30	(United States) Terrier-Improved Orion	NASA 41.134WO	(United States) Wallops Flight Facility		(United States) NASA	
26 June; 09:30	(United States) RockOn	Wallops Flight Facility	Suborbital	Education	26 June	Successful
28 June; 08:11	(United States) Terrier-Improved Malemute	NASA 46.037UE	(Marshall Islands) Reagan Test Site		(United States) NASA	
28 June; 08:11	(United States) SEED	ERAU	Suborbital	Sporadic E observations	28 June	Successful
28 June; 08:11	Sporadic E Electrodynamics (SEED). Second of two launches.					
28 June	(Yemen)		(Yemen)		(Yemen) Houthis	
28 June	(Yemen) Live warhead	Houthis	Suborbital	Missile launch	28 June	Intercepted
28 June	Targeted Israel.					
29 June; 14:39:56	(United States) New Shepard	NS-33	(United States) Corn Ranch		(United States) Blue Origin	
29 June; 14:39:56	(United States) Blue Origin NS-33	Blue Origin	Suborbital	Space tourism	29 June	Successful
29 June; 14:39:56	13th crewed New Shepard flight. Crew of six. Apogee: 105 km (65 mi)					
