= Outline of space science =

Overview of and topical guide to space science

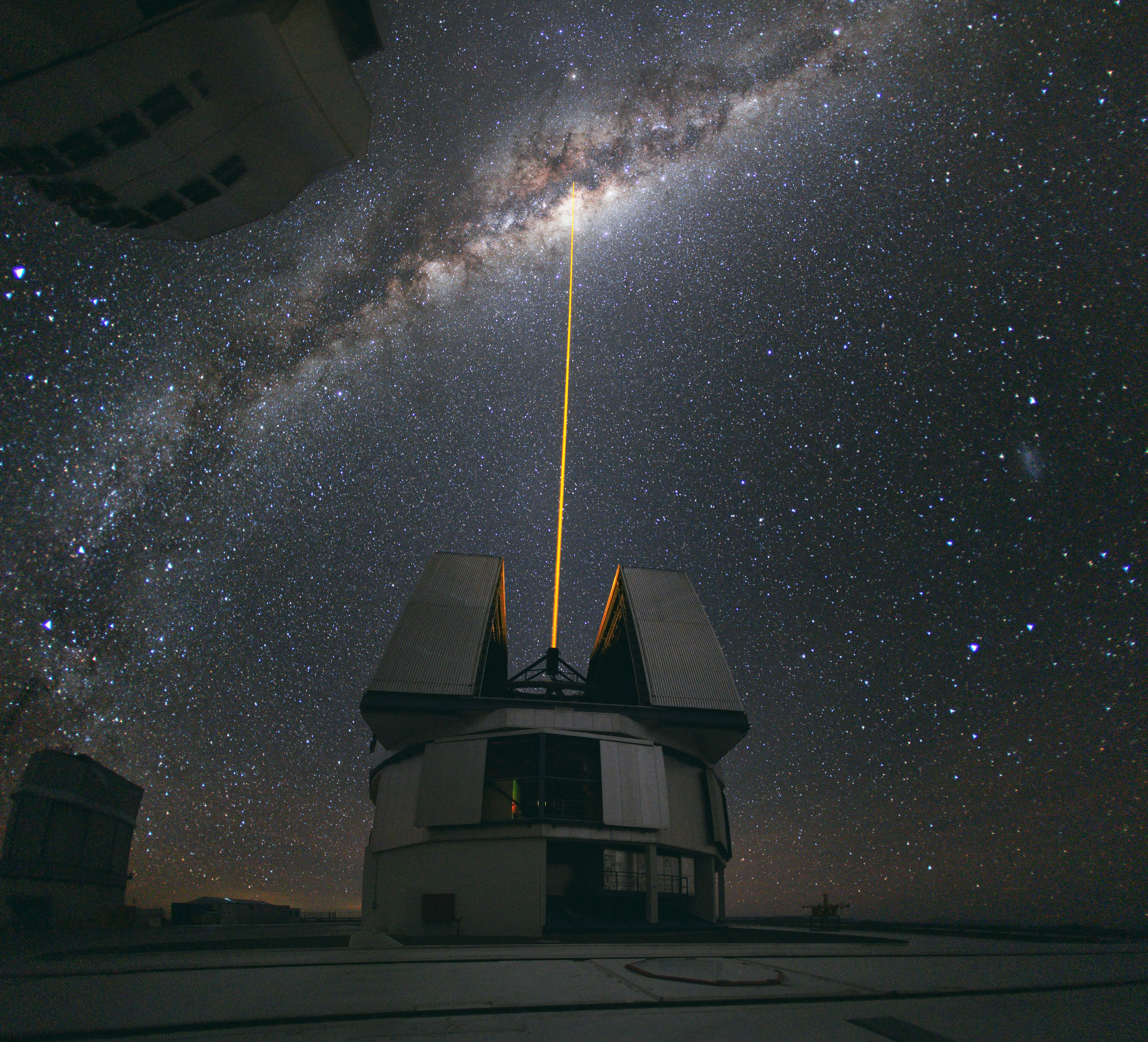
A laser-guided observation of the Milky Way Galaxy at the Paranal Observatory in Chile in 2010

The following outline is provided as an overview and topical guide to space science:

Space science – field that encompasses all of the scientific disciplines that involve space exploration and study natural phenomena and physical bodies occurring in outer space, such as space medicine and astrobiology.

== Branches of space sciences ==
=== Astronomy ===
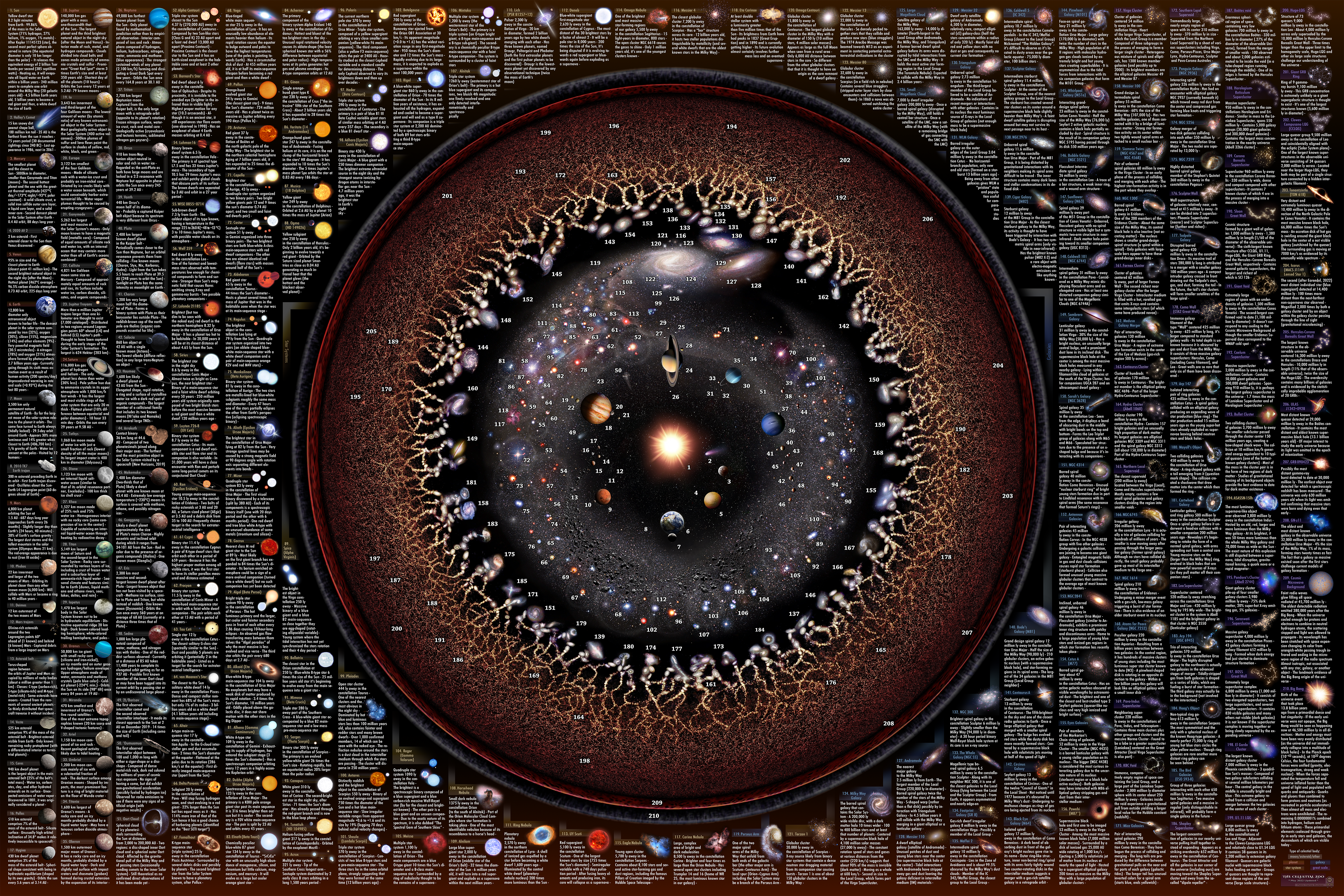
The diversity found in the different types and scales of astronomical objects make the field of study increasingly specialized.

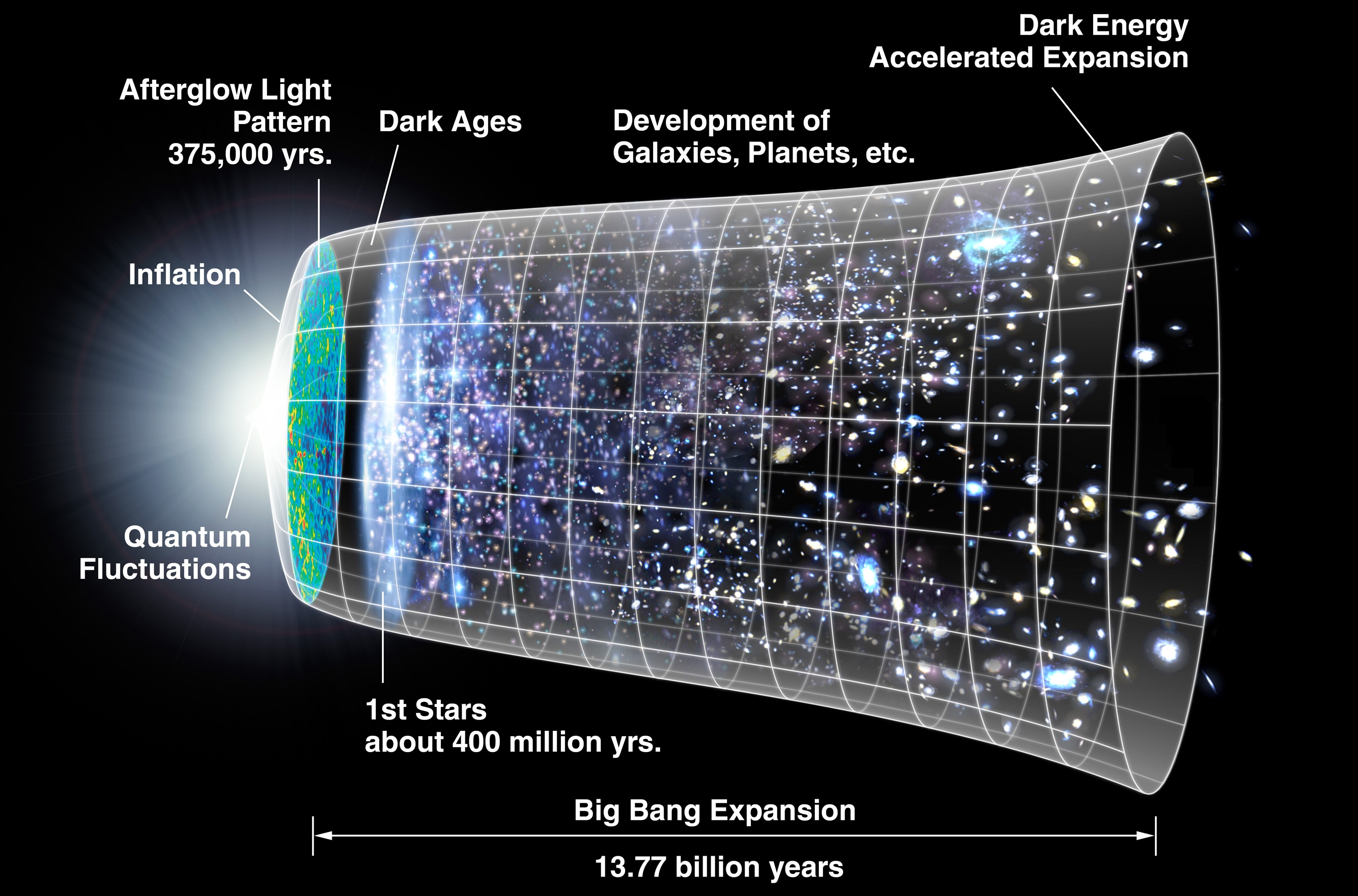
A proposed timeline of the origin of space, from physical cosmology

See astronomical object for a list of specific types of entities which scientists study. See Earth's location in the universe for an orientation.

- Subfields of astronomy:
  - Astrophysics – branch of astronomy that deals with the physics of the universe, including the physical properties of celestial objects, as well as their interactions and behavior. Among the objects studied are galaxies, stars, planets, exoplanets, the interstellar medium and the cosmic microwave background; and the properties examined include luminosity, density, temperature, and chemical composition. The subdisciplines of theoretical astrophysics are:
    - Computational astrophysics – The study of astrophysics using computational methods and tools to develop computational models.
    - Plasma astrophysics – studies properties of plasma in outer space.
    - Space physics – study of plasmas as they occur naturally in the Earth's upper atmosphere (aeronomy) and within the Solar System.
    - Solar physics – Sun and its interaction with the remainder of the Solar System and interstellar space.
    - Stellar astronomy – concerned with Star formation, physical properties, main sequence life span, variability, stellar evolution and extinction.
    - Galactic astronomy – deals with the structure and components of our galaxy and of other galaxies.
    - Extragalactic astronomy – study of objects (mainly galaxies) outside our galaxy, including Galaxy formation and evolution.
  - Cosmology
    - Physical cosmology – origin and evolution of the universe as a whole. The study of cosmology is theoretical astrophysics at its largest scale.
    - Chemical cosmology - study of the chemical composition of matter in the universe and the processes that led to those compositions.
    - Quantum cosmology – the study of cosmology through the use of quantum field theory to explain phenomena general relativity cannot due to limitations in its framework.
  - Planetary Science – study of planets, moons, and planetary systems.
    - Atmospheric science – study of atmospheres and weather.
    - Planetary geology
    - Planetary oceanography
    - Exoplanetology – various planets outside of the Solar System
  - Astrochemistry – studies the abundance and reactions of molecules in the Universe, and their interaction with radiation.
- Interdisciplinary studies of astronomy:
  - Astrobiology – studies the advent and evolution of biological systems in the universe.
  - Space biology – studies to build a better understanding of how spaceflight affects living systems in spacecraft, or in ground-based experiments that mimic aspects of spaceflight
  - Space chemistry – Reactions of elements to form more complex compounds, such as amino acids, are key to the study of chemistry in space.
    - Astrobotany – Sub-discipline of botany that is the study of plants in space environments.
  - Archaeoastronomy – studies ancient or traditional astronomies in their cultural context, utilizing archaeological and anthropological evidence.
  - Space archaeology – the study of human artifacts in outer space
  - Forensic astronomy – the use of astronomy, the scientific study of celestial objects, to determine the appearance of the sky at specific times in the past.
- Techniques used in astronomical research:
  - Astrometry – study of the position of objects in the sky and their changes of position. Defines the system of coordinates used and the kinematics of objects in our galaxy.
  - Photometry – study of how bright celestial objects are when passed through different filters
  - Spectroscopy – study of the spectra of astronomical objects
  - Observational astronomy – practice of observing celestial objects by using telescopes and other astronomical apparatus. Observatories on the ground as well as space observatories take measurements of celestial entities and phenomena. It is concerned with recording data. The subdisciplines of observational astronomy are generally made by the specifications of the detectors:
    - Radio astronomy – >300 μm
    - Submillimetre astronomy – 200 μm to 1 mm
    - Infrared astronomy – 0.7–350 μm
    - Optical astronomy – 380–750 nm
    - Ultraviolet astronomy – 10–320 nm
    - High-energy astronomy
      - Cosmic ray astronomy - charged particles with very high kinetic energy
      - X-ray astronomy – 0.01–10 nm
      - Gamma-ray astronomy – <0.01 nm
      - Neutrino astronomy – Neutrinos
    - Gravitational wave astronomy – Gravitons

=== Astronautics ===
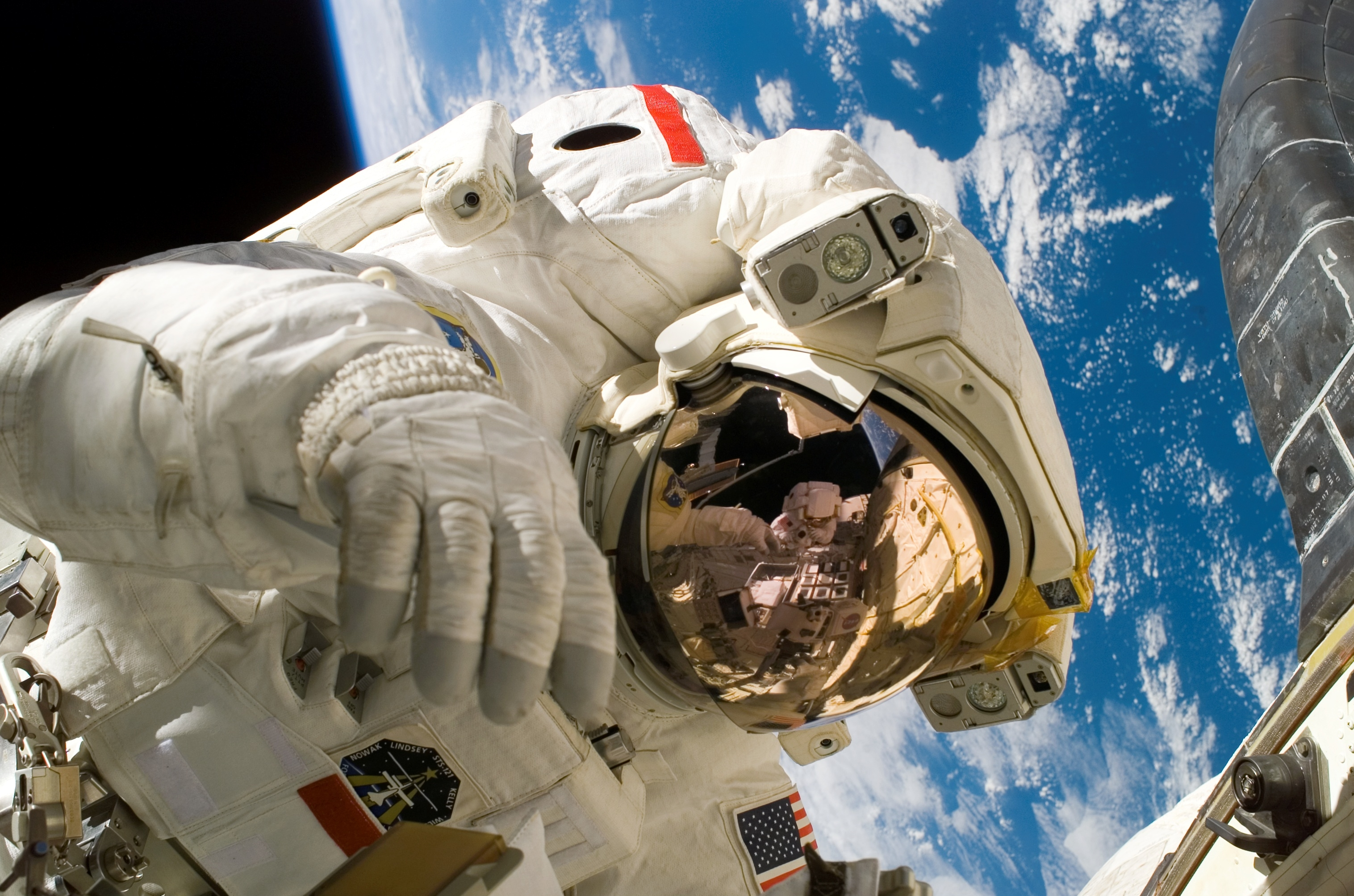
Astronaut Piers Sellers during the third spacewalk of STS-121, a demonstration of orbiter heat shield repair techniques

The science and engineering of spacefaring and spaceflight, a subset of Aerospace engineering (which includes atmospheric flight)

- Space technology is technology for use in outer space, in travel or other activities beyond Earth's atmosphere, for purposes such as spaceflight, space exploration, and Earth observation.
  - Spaceflight
    - Human spaceflight
    - Outline of space exploration
  - Space architecture
    - Life-support system
    - Space station
    - Space Habitation Module
- Life in space
  - Bioastronautics
  - Animals in space
  - Microorganisms tested in outer space
  - Plants in space
  - Humans in space
    - Women in space
    - Effect of spaceflight on the human body
    - Sleep in space
    - Food in space
    - Medicine in space
    - Neuroscience in space
    - Writing in space

== See also ==
- Space Sciences Laboratory – Research facility in the United States – University of California, Berkeley
- Space-based economy – Economic activity in space
- Commercial use of space – Economic activities related to space
  - Space manufacturing – Production of manufactured goods in an environment outside a planetary atmosphere
  - Space tourism – Human space travel for recreation
- Space warfare – Combat that takes place in outer space
  - Alien invasion – Common theme in science fiction stories and film
- Asteroid-impact avoidance – Methods to prevent destructive asteroid hits
- Space law – Law governing activities in outer space
- Remote sensing – Obtaining information through non-contact sensors
- Planetarium – Theatre for educational and entertaining shows about astronomy
- Centennial Challenges – NASA space competition inducement prize contests NASA prize contests
- Space and survival – Idea that spacefaring is necessary for long-term human survival
- Space colonization – Concept of permanent human habitation outside of Earth
- Space industry – Activities related to manufacturing components that go into Earth's orbit or beyond
- Timeline of artificial satellites and space probes
- Batteries in space
- Control engineering – Engineering discipline that deals with control systems
- Corrosion in space – Corrosion of materials occurring in outer space
- Nuclear power in space – Space exploration using nuclear energy
- Observatories in space – Instrument in space to study astronomical objects
- Orbital mechanics – Field of classical mechanics concerned with the motion of spacecraft
- Robotic spacecraft – Spacecraft without people on board
- Space environment – Study of how space conditions affect spacecraft
- Space logistics – Logistics for space travel
- Space technology – Technology developed for use in Space exploration
  - Space-based radar – Use of radar systems mounted on satellites
  - Space-based solar power – Concept of collecting solar power in outer space and distributing it to Earth
  - Spacecraft design – for launch vehicles and satellites
  - Spacecraft propulsion – Method used to accelerate spacecraft
