= Naos =

Naos may refer to:

- A naós or cella, the inner chamber in Greek and Roman temples
- An ancient Greek temple, called a naos in Koine Greek
- Naos (hieroglyph), an Egyptian hieroglyph
- Zeta Puppis, a star, also known as Naos
- NAOS (satellite), an earth observation satellite

== See also ==
- Naus (disambiguation)
