= Ariel (rocket) =

Gilmour Space Technologies Ariel
- Function: Suborbital launch vehicle & Sounding Rocket
- Manufacturer: Gilmour Space Technologies
- Country of origin: Australia

Size
- Stages: 1

Capacity

Payload to Kármán line
- Mass: 150kg

Launch history
- Status: Under development
- Total launches: 0
- Success(es): 0
- Landings: 0
- First flight: 2019

First stage
- Powered by: 1 G-70 Hybrid Engine
- Maximum thrust: 16,000 lbf (70 kN)

Ariel is a suborbital launch vehicle being developed by Australian private space company Gilmour Space Technologies, for use as a sounding rocket. The vehicle has been developed to demonstrate and test the company's numerous technologies. The rocket serves as a part of for the company's preparation orbital spaceflight capabilities after 2020.

== One Vision ==
On February 1, 2019, Gilmour revealed "One Vision", the first Ariel-class rocket to be constructed. The original launch date was set for late February, however, this was pushed back to "sometime in March". The main purpose of One Vision is to test the G-70 hybrid rocket motor, before it is used for commercial launches in 2020. One Vision will be launched from a custom-made mobile launch facility, which is the first of its kind built in Australia and should Ariel-class rockets be launched from it, would have the largest commercial launch capacity in the world.
