= Naus =

Naus may refer to:

- Carracks (or naus), early modern Portuguese ships
- John E. Naus, American priest
- Josef Naus, German surveyor and mountain climber

== See also ==
- Naos (disambiguation)
- Nau (disambiguation)
