= Atmos Space Cargo =

German aerospace company

Atmos Space Cargo is a German private aerospace company developing reusable space logistics and cargo-return technologies for low Earth orbit missions. The company is best known for its Phoenix re-entry capsule, designed to return scientific experiments and commercial payloads from space using an inflatable heat shield system.

== History ==
In April 2025, ATMOS conducted the first orbital test flight of the Phoenix 1 capsule aboard a SpaceX Bandwagon-3 mission, gathering re-entry and flight data for future operations. In August 2026, the company completed an early-stage design study for its reusable Phoenix 3 spacecraft, conducted with the European Space Agency (ESA) at ESTEC.

== See also ==
- List of private spaceflight companies
