= Muon Space =

American aerospace company

- Founded: 2021; 5 years ago
- Founder: Jonny Dyer; Dan McCleese; Paul Day; Reuben Rohrschneider; Pascal Stang
- Key people: Jonny Dyer (CEO); Paul Day (COO)

Muon Space is an American aerospace startup located in Silicon Valley, California. The company was founded in 2021 with the goal of building a climate-monitoring satellite constellation. By July 2023, the company had raised approximately $35 million in total funding to allow them to develop the technology to do so.

The company launched the first satellite of its constellation, dubbed MuSat-1, on June 12, 2023, on SpaceX's Transporter-8 rideshare mission aboard a Falcon 9 rocket from Vandenberg Space Force Base. This first satellite weighs 70 kg and will demonstrate the technology developed by Muon for the other satellites in its constellation. In 2024, Muon Space is expecting to launch two more satellites, MuSat-2 and MuSat-3.

Muon Space also has a program called Muon Halo, that is a service provided to customers who do not have the expertise to develop spacecraft, handle data processing and manage ground networks. The first payloads to be sent to space under that program are expected to be launched in 2025 and 2026. Muon Space received $60 million from paying customers to develop the systems required for these payloads.
