= Space Concordia =

Student organisation

Space Concordia, commonly referred to as SC, is a student organisation at Concordia University in Montreal, Canada, dedicated to the development of space technology and teaching students about space related sciences.

Over 150 members are organized in five divisions.

Space Concordia's Rocketry division is currently competing in the Base 11 Space Challenge, developing a liquid fuelled rocket with the goal to cross the Kármán line.

The development and most of the manufacturing is done in-house by students, including the construction of the mobile engine test stand Trailer Tom.

== History ==
Space Concordia was founded in 2010 by assistant professor Scott Gleason at Concordia University with the purpose of competing in the Canadian Satellite Design Challenge (CSDC). The team had less than ten members then. Their entry in the competition, the satellite Consat-1, won first place. The team working on satellites became later the Spacecraft division of Space Concordia.

In 2012 Rocketry and Robotics divisions were founded. Robotics builds rovers and Rocketry is dedicated to the construction of rockets.

Rocketry division's first rocket ever, Arcturus, was awarded 2nd place in the payload category of the 10th Intercollegiate Rocket Engineering Competition (IREC) in 2015. The solid rocket reached a height of 12,705 ft (3,872 m).

In 2016, Space Concordia won 2nd place in the basic category of the 11th IREC.

In 2018, the rocket Supersonice reached a height of 30,000 ft (9,100 m) and a top speed of mach 1.8. Space Concordia's first supersonic rocket won first place in the Spaceport America Cup.

Later in 2018, Rocketry started development of a liquid fuelled rocket to compete in the Base 11 Space Challenge. Space Concordia won second place in the design phase and first place in the Critical Design Review (CDR).

On June 18 2021, they successfully completed a hot-fire test of the engine. Space Concordia fired the most powerful liquid fuelled student rocket engine, producing an average thrust of 35 kN at ground level.

== Divisions ==
Space Concordia is organized into five divisions: Robotics, Liquid Rocketry, Spacecraft, Solid Rocketry and Space Health.

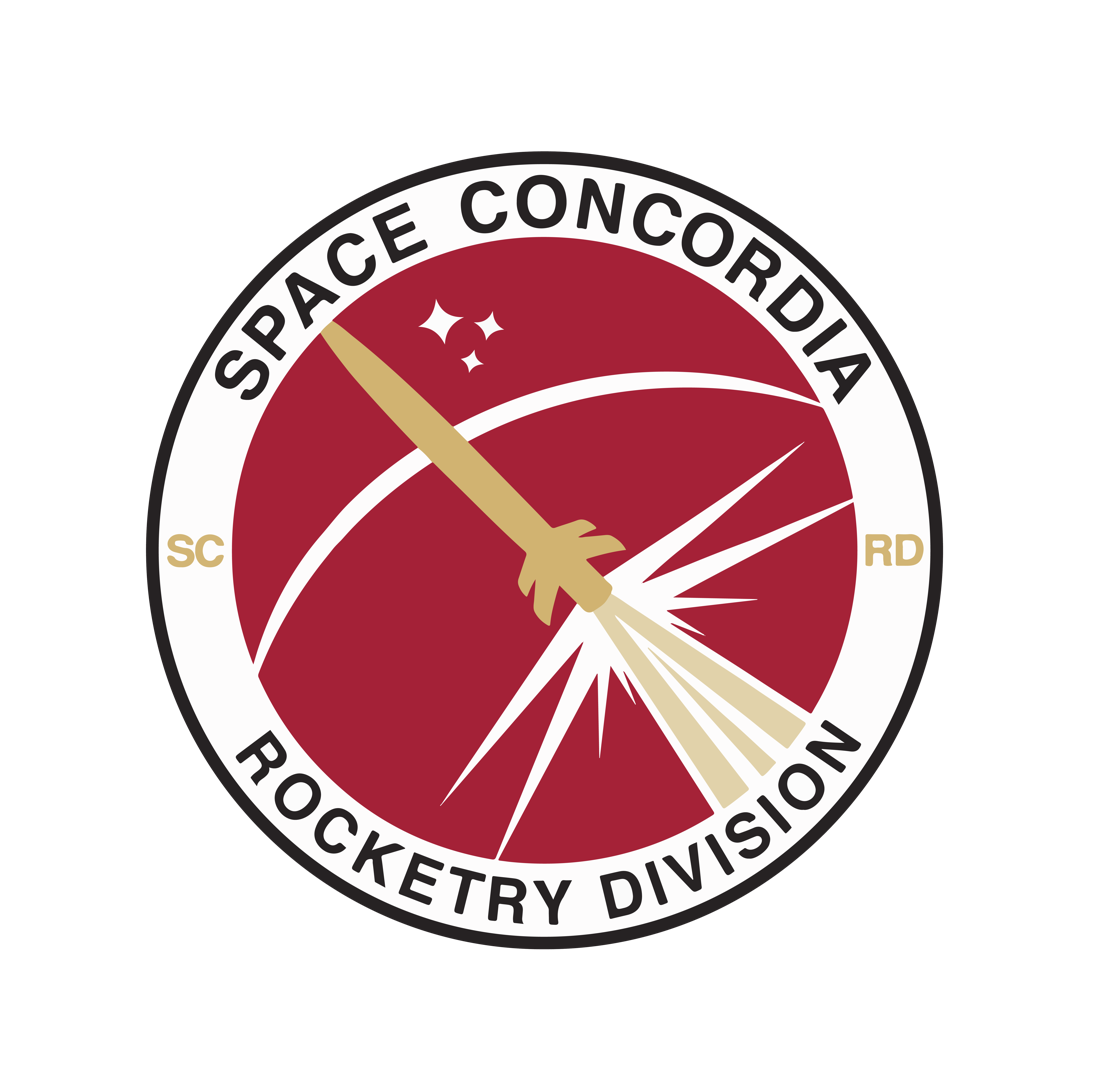
Space Concordia's Rocketry Division Logo

== Rocketry Division ==
Space Concordia Rocketry Division, commonly abbreviated as SCRD, focuses on the design, development and testing of liquid rockets.

Since 2018 Space Concordia Rocketry Division has been developing a liquid rocket known as "StarSailor". This rocket is designed to fly to the Kármán line. The rocket is powered by a pressure-fed Kerosene-Liquid Oxygen rocket which currently holds the Canadian record for highest thrust produced by amateur rocketry teams in Canada.

== Facilities ==
Space Concordia’s club room, commonly referred to as 'Space Lab', is located on the 9th floor of the Henry F. Hall Building on Concordia’s downtown campus.

Space Concordia’s members have also access to the 'Cage', an area in the basement of the Henry F. Hall Building, used by different clubs and capstone students. The Cage is used for manufacturing, and storing equipment and parts.

Concordia’s Engineering Design and Manufacturing Lab (EDML) is used by members to manufacture parts that require machining. The EDML is also located in the basement of the Henry F. Hall Building. It is supervised by university staff members, who also assist and train students. The lab is equipped with manual drills, mills, lathes and a welding area.

== Awards By Division ==
Spacecraft Division

- 2012 1st place in the first Canadian Satellite Design Challenge (CSDC)
- 2016 1st place in the third Canadian Satellite Design Challenge (CSDC)

Rocketry Division

- 2016 2nd place in the basic category of the 11th IREC
- 2018 1st place in 30k ft category of the Spaceport America Cup
- 2019 2nd place in design review of the Base 11 Space Challenge
- 2021 1st place in the Critical Design Review (CDR) of the Base 11 Space Challenge

== Rockets ==
Space Concordia has built and launched five rockets so far.

- Arcturus (2015)
- Aurelius (2016)
- Maurice (2017)
- Supersonice (2018)
- StarSailor (2018-Present)

== See also ==
- Concordia University
- Delft Aerospace Rocket Engineering
- Spaceport America Cup
- Liquid-propellant rocket
- WARR (TUM)
