= NAOS (satellite) =

Earth observation/reconnaissance satellite system

- Mission type: Earth observation Reconnaissance
- Operator: LUXEOps/MAE
- COSPAR ID: 2025-188C
- SATCAT no.: 65317
- Mission duration: 7+3 years (planned)

Spacecraft properties
- Manufacturer: OHB Italia
- Launch mass: 645 kg (1,422 lb)

Start of mission
- Launch date: 26 August 2025, 18:53 UTC
- Rocket: Falcon 9 Block 5
- Launch site: Vandenberg, SLC-4E
- Contractor: SpaceX

Orbital parameters
- Reference system: Geocentric orbit
- Regime: Sun-synchronous orbit
- Altitude: 450 km (280 mi)
- Inclination: 98°

NAOS (National Advanced Optical System) is a high-resolution Earth observation satellite developed by OHB Italia for the Luxembourg Directorate of Defence as part of the Luxembourg Earth Observation System (LUXEOSys). Designed for dual-use governmental and military purposes, NAOS provides very high-resolution optical imagery for applications in defense, security, and humanitarian efforts, supporting organizations such as NATO, European Union, and the United Nations. The satellite was launched on August 26, 2025, aboard a SpaceX Falcon 9 rocket from Vandenberg Space Force Base, California.

NAOS will be operated by LUXEOPs, consortium consisting of RHEA System Luxembourg, LUXSPACE, OHB and RHEA System.

== Orbit & operations ==
NAOS operates in a sun-synchronous Low Earth orbit at approximately 450 km altitude, allowing it to circle the Earth about 15 times per day and achieve global coverage. This orbit enables the satellite to capture more than 100 images daily, with a minimum response time of 17 hours from image request to availability.

== Launch ==
Originally scheduled for launch in 2023 aboard an Arianespace Vega-C rocket, NAOS faced delays due to issues with the launch vehicle. The mission was subsequently reassigned to a SpaceX Falcon 9 Block 5 rocket. The launch took place on August 26, 2025, at 18:53 UTC from Space Launch Complex 4E (SLC-4E) at Vandenberg Space Force Base, California. The Falcon 9 first stage booster, B1063 completed its 27th flight and successfully returned to Landing Zone 4 (LZ-4) at the launch site. The mission also carried secondary payloads as rideshare, including Dhruva Space LEAP-1, Planet Labs Pelican-3 and Pelican-4, and Capella Space Acadia-6, and Pixxel Firefly 4,5,6 satellites.

== Significance ==
The NAOS satellite represents Luxembourg's growing investment in space-based capabilities, aligning with the nation's strategic goals in defense and international cooperation. By providing high-resolution imagery to NATO, the EU, and other partners, NAOS enhances Luxembourg's contributions to collective security and global monitoring efforts. The project also underscores the increasing role of space in national security, complementing Luxembourg's other space initiatives, such as the GovSat program and the O3b mPOWER constellation.

== See also ==
- Falcon 9
- OHB
- Earth observation satellite
