= Cosmic ray astronomy =

Branch of observational astronomy dealing with high-energy cosmic rays

Cosmic ray astronomy is a branch of observational astronomy where scientists attempt to identify and study the potential sources of extremely high-energy (ranging from 1 MeV to more than 1 EeV) charged particles called cosmic rays coming from outer space. These particles, which include protons (nucleus of hydrogen), electrons, positrons and atomic nuclei (mostly of helium, but potentially of all chemical elements), travel through space at nearly the speed of light (such as the ultra-high-energy "Oh-My-God particle") and provide valuable insights into the most energetic processes in the universe. Unlike other branches of observational astronomy, it uniquely relies on charged particles as carriers of information.

== Detection methods ==
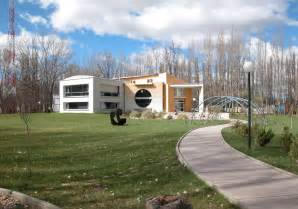
The Pierre Auger Observatory in Argentina is the world's largest cosmic ray observatory

Astronomers use ground-based detectors, high-altitude research balloons, artificial satellites and other methods to detect cosmic rays. Ground-based detectors, often spread over large areas (for example, the Pierre Auger Observatory is an array of detectors spread over 3,000 square kilometers), identify and analyze the secondary particles (electrons, positrons, photons, muons, etc.) produced in a chain reaction of particle interactions triggered by the collision of cosmic rays and Earth's atmosphere. The properties of the original cosmic ray particle, such as arrival direction and energy, are inferred from the measured properties of the extensive air shower, which is the cascade of secondary particles collectively showering down through the atmosphere. There are two kinds of ground-based detectors: Surface detector arrays analyze the air shower at a unique altitude, whereas air fluorescence detectors record the shower development in the atmosphere, based on the interactions of air shower particles with nitrogen molecules in the atmosphere. Modern "hybrid" detectors, such as the Pierre Auger Observatory in Argentina and the Large High Altitude Air Shower Observatory in Sichuan, China, take advantage of the complementary nature of these two. Moreover, scientific balloons (such as the one used in Cosmic Ray Energetics and Mass Experiment) and satellites (such as China's Dark Matter Particle Explorer or DAMPE telescope) can also be used to observe pure cosmic rays at very high altitudes and in outer space.

== Benefits ==
By studying the energy, direction, and composition of cosmic rays, scientists can uncover the sources and acceleration mechanisms behind these particles, which reveal astrophysical processes such as supernova explosions, black hole accretion, and galactic magnetic fields. Observations of cosmic rays led to the discovery of subatomic particles beyond the proton, neutron, and electron, including the positron and the muon, laying the groundwork for modern particle physics. It reveals the nucleosynthetic processes leading to the origin of the elements. By measuring cosmic rays, scientists discovered the presence of magnetic fields and radiation in the Solar System. Some cosmic rays originate from beyond the Solar System or galaxy, allowing scientists to estimate the amount and composition of matter in the universe, providing crucial information about its makeup. Cosmic rays are generated in extreme astrophysical environments such as exploding stars, black holes, and galactic collisions and provide a rare window into these processes. Energetic cosmic rays can interact with objects traveling through space, altering their isotopic composition. By studying these isotopes in meteorites, scientists can determine when they formed and fell on Earth, providing insights into the history of the Solar System. Cosmic rays have practical applications, including monitoring soil moisture for agriculture and irrigation practices and carbon-14 dating, which helps determine the ages of archaeological artifacts and geological formations.

== History ==
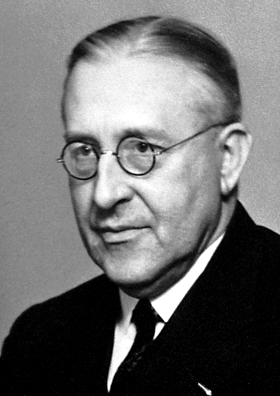
Austrian-American astronomer Victor Hess first discovered cosmic rays in 1912 with airborne ballons.

Historical milestones in cosmic ray astronomy include Victor Hess's discovery of cosmic rays during balloon flights in 1912; the identification of new subatomic particles like the positron and muon in the 1930s, expanding our understanding of particle physics; Pierre Victor Auger's discovery of extensive particle showers from cosmic ray collisions high in the atmosphere; ground-based detectors measuring cosmic ray flux and energy spectrum in the 1940s-1950s; the establishment of the Volcano Ranch cosmic ray observatory in the 1960s, initiating large-scale experiments; the discovery of cosmic ray anisotropy (the fact that cosmic rays do not arrive uniformly from every region of the sky) in the 1960s, unveiling variations in flux and direction; the emergence of high-energy gamma-ray telescopes in the 1980s-1990s, enabling observations of gamma rays produced by cosmic ray interactions; the advent of space-based detectors like AMS-02 on the International Space Station in the 2000s, providing insights from space; and recent progress in multi-messenger astronomy in the 2010s, integrating cosmic ray observations with other astrophysical signals for a more complete view of cosmic phenomena.

== Future ==
With advancements in technology and the development of more sensitive detection systems, astronomers anticipate making new discoveries about the sources, acceleration mechanisms, and propagation of cosmic rays. These insights will contribute to a deeper understanding of the underlying physics governing the cosmos. Future cosmic ray observatories, such as the Cherenkov Telescope Array, will use advanced techniques to detect gamma rays produced by cosmic ray interactions in Earth's atmosphere. Since these gamma rays will be the most sensitive means to study cosmic rays near their source, these observatories will enable astronomers to study cosmic rays with unprecedented precision. Cosmic ray astronomy faces difficulty in identifying the exact sources of cosmic rays because charged particles are deflected by magnetic fields in space, and as a result tracing the paths of cosmic rays back to their origins require sophisticated modeling techniques and multi-messenger observations to infer their source locations. Moreover, due to the high-energy nature of these rays, the need for full-sky exposure, minimization of deflection by magnetic fields and elimination of background from distant sources present technical challenges.
