= Gilmour Space Technologies =

Australian space company

Coordinates: 27.8171°S 153.2842°E

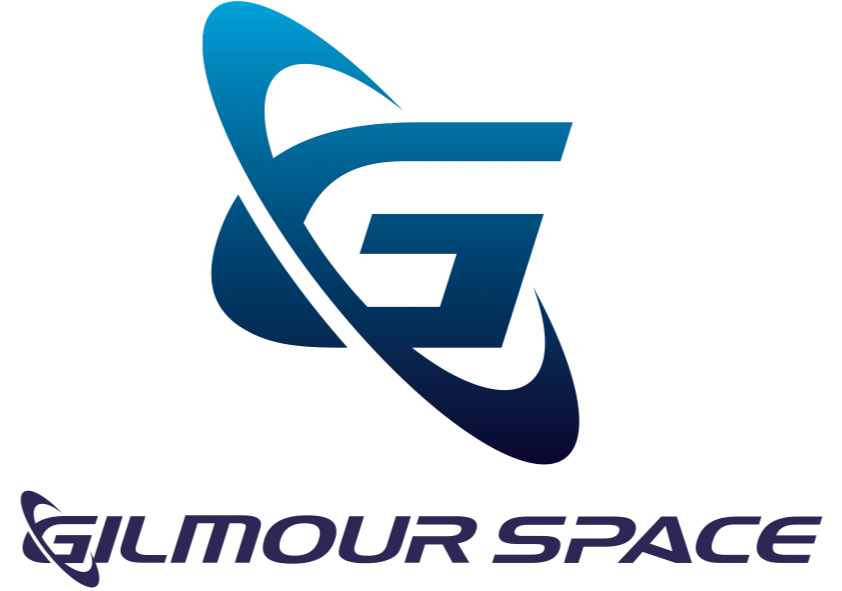
- Type: Private
- Industry: Aerospace
- Founded: 2013; 13 years ago
- Founders: Adam Gilmour, James Gilmour
- Headquarters: 77 Darlington Drive, Yatala, Queensland, Australia
- Services: Orbital rockets, space access, satellite buses
- Number of employees: 201
- Website: www.gspace.com

Gilmour Space Technologies is a venture-funded Australian aerospace company that is developing hybrid-propellant rocket engines and associated technologies to support the deployment of a low-cost launch vehicle.

Founded in 2012, Gilmour Space's function is to provide space launch services to the small satellite market using Australian-built Eris orbital rockets, launched from Gilmour's private spaceport in North Queensland. The company also intends to offer a ride-sharing service, in addition to a modular G-Sat small satellite bus/platform.

The maiden flight of Eris Block 1, which was unveiled by Prime Minister Anthony Albanese as Australia's first sovereign orbital rocket, took place on 30 July 2025 from Bowen Orbital Spaceport at Abbot Point, Bowen, resulting in failure after 14 seconds of flight.

Gilmour Space has long-term ambitions to develop a range of Eris-class launch vehicles capable of carrying larger satellites/payloads into low Earth orbits, and eventually provide space access for crewed orbital missions.

== Founding ==
Gilmour Space was founded in Australia 2013 by brothers Adam and James Gilmour.

The company's first project in 2013 was to design and manufacture high-fidelity spaceflight simulators and replicas for a number of space-related exhibits and the Spaceflight Academy Gold Coast. It began its rocket development program in 2015; and within 18 months, successfully launched Australia and Singapore's first privately developed hybrid test rocket reaching an altitude of 4–5 km in a 90 seconds flight.

Since then, the company has been developing larger rockets, including the One Vision suborbital rocket and Eris orbital launch vehicle.

== Investors ==
As a leading New Space pioneer in Australia, Gilmour Space is backed by some of the country's largest investors, including Blackbird Ventures (which led its Series A fund raise) and Main Sequence Ventures (which led its Series B raise); as well as international investors like Fine Structure Ventures (Series C) and 500 Startups. Other investors include Queensland Investment Corporation and Australian superannuation funds Hostplus, HESTA and NGS Super.

== Launch vehicles ==
=== RASTA test rocket ===
RASTA (Reusable Ascent SeparaTion Article) was a sub-orbital sounding rocket launched by Gilmour Space on 22 July 2016, propelled by a proprietary hybrid rocket engine. It performed nominally during the test flight and reached an apogee of 5 km. RASTA was the first launch vehicle flown by Gilmour Space and was the world's first demonstration of a rocket launch using 3D printed fuel.

=== One Vision suborbital rocket ===
One Vision was a sub-orbital sounding rocket designed to test Gilmour Space's new mobile launch platform and their hybrid rocket engines. On 29 July 2019, One Vision was prepared and fuelled for its maiden test flight, however, during the countdown to launch, the vehicle suffered an anomaly, resulting in a premature end to the mission. The anomaly was caused by a pressure regulator in the oxidiser tank that had failed to maintain required pressure, causing damage to the tank. According to the company, after a detailed investigation into the anomaly, 15 key recommendations were implemented into the design of Eris. As part of the One Vision launch campaign, the company also designed and built a mobile rocket launch platform (as there were no commercial Australian launch sites at the time), which was successfully tested during the campaign.

=== Eris-1 (Orbital rocket) ===
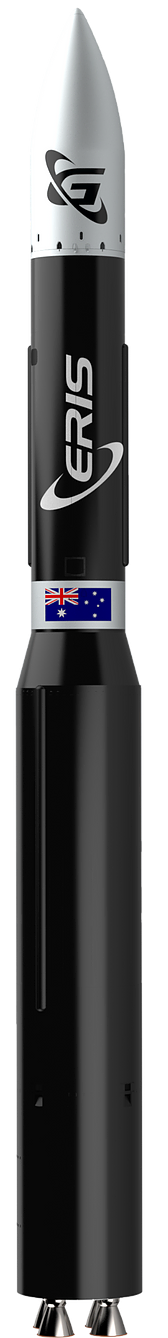
Graphic of Gilmour Space's Eris-1 rocket

Gilmour Space is currently developing its Eris Block 1 rocket, a three-stage small-lift launch vehicle designed to carry up to 300 kg of payload to low Earth orbit. The vehicle is known to have four of Gilmour's Sirius hybrid rocket motors propelling the first stage, another Sirius motor in its second stage, and a new Phoenix liquid rocket engine in its third stage. Eris has a height of 25m and a diameter of 2m for the first stage, which tapers at the interstage of the first and second stage to 1.5m. The payload fairing has 2 diameter versions, either 1.5m or 1.2m. Eris Block 1 will be the first Australian orbital rocket to launch from Australia, and the first orbital launch attempt from Australia in over 50 years. Moreover, if successful, Eris could be the world's first hybrid rocket to achieve orbit.

Eris first went vertical on the launchpad on 11 April 2024 in preparation for launch, and successfully conducted its first full wet dress rehearsal on 30 September 2024. Gilmour Space was granted a launch permit for Eris by the Australian Space Agency (ASA) on 4 November. The second and final wet test was conducted in early December, and the company received regulatory approval from the Civil Aviation Safety Authority (CASA) on 19 February 2025. Following multiple delays attributed to Tropical Cyclone Alfred, Gilmour was forced to further postpone the launch attempt.

On 4 May 2025, Gilmour announced that it had received approval from CASA to open a launch window starting on 15 May. However, problems with the payload fairing resulted in the first launch attempt being scrubbed. This was preceded by a separate issue with the ground support system that caused a 24-hour delay. The company stated that a thorough investigation would be conducted into the cause of the anomaly affecting the payload fairing, and that they hoped to get Eris back on the pad by June.

On 19 May, Adam Gilmour revealed that the issue with the fairing had been attributed to a technical fault during pre-flight checks. He explained that the rocket's stage separation mechanisms were pressurised with gas, but when power to the rocket's upper stage was turned off, this triggered the fairing to go through its separation sequence. However, the fairing itself was said to have functioned properly, and a replacement nose cone was dispatched from the company's Gold Coast factory.

Eris' maiden flight occurred on 30 July 2025 and was the first orbital launch attempt of an Australian-made rocket from Australian soil, according to Gilmour Space. Eris Block 1 attempted lift-off from Bowen shortly before 8:35 a.m. AEST, but the vehicle suffered a malfunction attributed to insufficient thrust, and crashed 14 seconds after launch.

Gilmour announced that they would review the data from TestFlight 1 to identify the cause of the failure, and apply learnings to their second launch attempt, dubbed TestFlight 2, which is slated to occur in early 2026. The company also confirmed that the next Block 1 vehicle is in production.

=== Further Eris variants ===
Gilmour Space has revealed it is developing an Eris Block 2 vehicle capable of lifting up to 1,000 kg to low Earth orbit, which is expected to enter commercial service in 2026. The company has also unveiled future plans for an Eris Heavy variant, which would be capable of lifting 4,000 kg payloads into orbit. If built, Eris Heavy would be classified as a medium-lift launch vehicle, potentially capable of carrying human-rated spacecraft.

=== Engine static tests ===
Since starting its rocket program in 2015, Gilmour Space has conducted hundreds of engine static test firings, most recently:

Engine static test firings
Date	Achieved thrust	Duration	Engine name
February, 2018	70 kN	4 seconds	"G-70" One Vision Engine
May, 2018	75 kN	12 seconds	Eris First/Second Stage Engine
August, 2018	80 kN	17 seconds	Eris First/Second Stage Engine
January, 2020	91 kN	10 seconds	Eris First/Second Stage Engine
June, 2020	Unknown	45 seconds	Eris Third Stage Engine
July, 2020	Unknown	110 seconds	Eris Third Stage Engine
February, 2021	90 kN	30 seconds	Eris First/Second Stage Engine
January 2022	110 kN	75 seconds	Eris hybrid First/Second Stage Engine
November 2022	115 kN	100 seconds	Eris hybrid First/Second Stage Engine

== Bowen Orbital Spaceport (BOS) ==
Bowen Orbital Spaceport, on the coast of Queensland, Australia

In May 2021, results from an environmental and technical study conducted by the Queensland Government for Abbot Point, Bowen gave Gilmour the green light to begin work on an orbital launch facility located in the Abbot Point Development Area.

Since then, the company has engaged with the indigenous Juru people and local businesses to construct the Bowen Orbital Spaceport. When approved, this privately operated site will provide Gilmour Space with launch access to 20° to 65° low- to mid-inclination equatorial orbits.

Following final approvals from the Federal Government and Australian Space Agency, BOS became Australia's first commercial orbital spaceport on the 5th of March 2024, with its maiden launch of Eris-1 (also Australia's first orbital launch vehicle) originally planned for later in 2024. Following delays with the issuance of launch permits, this was pushed back to March 2025, but licensing issues continued to delay the launch.

== Launches ==
Launch attempts are listed chronologically. Launches are expected to take place "no earlier than" (NET) the listed date.

=== 2025 ===
Flight No.	Date and time (UTC)	Launch site	Orbit	Launch Outcome
1	29 July 2025, 10:35pm UTC (30 July 2025, 8:35am AEST)	Bowen Orbital Spaceport	LEO (planned)	Failure
1	Maiden flight of Eris-1, 'Eris TestFlight 1'. Eris-1 attempted to reach low Earth orbit. On 4 May 2025, Gilmour Space announced that they had received approval from CASA, and that they were still waiting on final clearance from the ASA, which was granted on the 9th. They also stated their intention to open a two-week launch window starting on 15 May. The company was forced to postpone its first launch attempt on the morning of the 15th due to a technical issue with the rocket's electrical system. Co-founder and CEO Adam Gilmour announced their intention to make another launch attempt the following morning. However, the second attempt also had to be scrubbed after an unexplained anomaly caused the rocket's payload failing to separate while it was still on the launch pad. Gilmour Space reported no damage to property or personnel. Eris attempted lift-off on 30 July, with the mission ending in failure after 14 seconds of flight time.			

== Others ==
In February 2018 (since lapsed), Gilmour Space signed a reimbursable Space Act Agreement with NASA to collaborate on various research, technology development and educational initiatives, including the testing of its MARS rover at Kennedy Space Center.

In December 2019, Gilmour Space signed a statement of strategic intent with the Australian Space Agency as a demonstration of its commitment to launch Australia to space.

In June 2022, it was confirmed that Gilmour Space had been awarded a federal Modern Manufacturing Initiative Collaboration grant worth $52 million to establish the Australian Space Manufacturing Network (ASMN).

In mid-2024, construction was finalised on a 10,000 sqm advanced manufacturing facility in Yatala, Queensland, which will also serve as Gilmour Space's new headquarters. The facility is a large warehouse with an annexe for corporate offices, and is located within the Stockland Distribution Centre South.
