= List of Czech satellites =

This list covers all artificial satellites built or operated by institutions or companies from Czechoslovakia or Czechia.

Launched 1978 – 2019
#	Name	COSPAR ID	Purpose	Consortium	Launch date	Launch vehicle	Launch site
1	Magion 1	1978-099C	Atmospheric science, magnetosphere	Czechoslovak Academy of Sciences	24 October 1978	Kosmos-3M	Plesetsk
2	Magion 2	1989-080B	Atmospheric science, magnetosphere	Czechoslovak Academy of Sciences	28 September 1989	Tsyklon-3	Plesetsk
3	Magion 3	1991-086E	Atmospheric science, magnetosphere	Czechoslovak Academy of Sciences	18 December 1991	Tsyklon-3	Plesetsk
Dissolution of Czechoslovakia on 31 December 1992
4	Magion 4	1995-039F	Atmospheric science, magnetosphere	Czech Academy of Sciences	2 August 1995	Molniya-M	Plesetsk
5	Magion 5	1996-050B	Atmospheric science, magnetosphere	Czech Academy of Sciences	29 August 1996	Molniya-M	Plesetsk
6	MIMOSA	2003-031B	Atmospheric science	Czech Academy of Sciences, Space Devices	30 June 2003	Rokot	Plesetsk
7	VZLUSAT-1	2017-036AB	Technology demonstration	VZLU Aerospace	23 June 2017	PSLV-XL	Sriharikota
8	Lucky-7	2019-038W	Technology demonstration	SkyFox Labs, CTU	5 July 2019	Soyuz-2-1b	Vostochny

Launched in 2020s
#	Name	COSPAR ID	Purpose	Consortium	Launch date	Launch vehicle	Launch site
9	VZLUSAT-2	2022-002DF	Technology demonstration	VZLU Aerospace	13 January 2022	Falcon 9	SLC-40
10	BDSAT	2022-033U	Amateur radio, technology demonstration	CEITEC, BD Sensors, Spacemanic	1 April 2022	Falcon 9	SLC-40
11	Planetum-1	2022-057G	Education	Planetum, VZLU Aerospace, Spacemanic	25 May 2022	Falcon 9	SLC-40
12	BDSAT-2	2023-001CT	Amateur radio, technology demonstration	CEITEC, BD Sensors, Spacemanic	3 January 2023	Falcon 9	SLC-40
13	LASARsat	2024-247Q	Technology demonstration	LASAR, Planetum, Spacemanic, HiLASE, VZLU AEROSPACE, SkyFox Labs	21 December 2024	Falcon 9	SLC-4E
14	SATurnin-1	2025-009M	Earth observation	VZLU Aerospace	14 January 2025	Falcon 9	SLC-4E
15	TROLL	2025-009BB	Earth observation	TRL Space	14 January 2025	Falcon 9	SLC-4E
16	CEVROSAT 1	2025-248M	Amateur radio, education	CEVRO University, ČVC Electronic, Brno University of Technology, Mendel University in Brno	2 November 2025	Falcon 9	SLC-40
17	KOSTKA	2026-156BU	Amateur radio, Education, technology demonstration	ESA, YSpace, Brno University of Technology	7 July 2026	Falcon 9	SLC-4E

Future
Name	Purpose	Consortium	Launch date	Launch vehicle	Launch site	Ref
BRNOsat	Technology demonstration, UV astronomy, education	Brno, Hvězdárna a planetárium Brno, VZLU Aerospace, Spacemanic, Masaryk University, Brno University of Technology	2027			
CEVROSAT 2	Technology demonstration	CEVRO University, Stellar Space, Slovak Space Office, ČVC Electronic	2027			
VZLUGEM	Technology demonstration	VZLU Aerospace	2027			
Corvus-IOV	Technology demonstration	ESA, Spacemanic	2027			
CIMER	Technology demonstration, microbiology	ESA, YSpace, Brno University of Technology	2027			
RIDESHARE 2027	Technology demonstration	Spacemanic	2027			
SATen	Meteor observation, technology demonstration, testing the FREYA camera	Spacemanic, Brno University of Technology, Heyrovský Institute of Physical Chemistry (CAS), HiLASE, ESC Aerospace, VZLU Aerospace	2028			
QUVIK	UV astronomy	ESA, VZLU Aerospace	2028			
AMBIC	Earth observation	ESA, VZLU Aerospace	2030			
SOVA-S	Atmospheric science	ESA, OHB Czechspace, Berlin Space Technologies, OHB System, DLR	2030			
EARS	Atmospheric science	ESA, Stellar Exploration, Spacemanic, Groundcom	N/A			

== Gallery ==
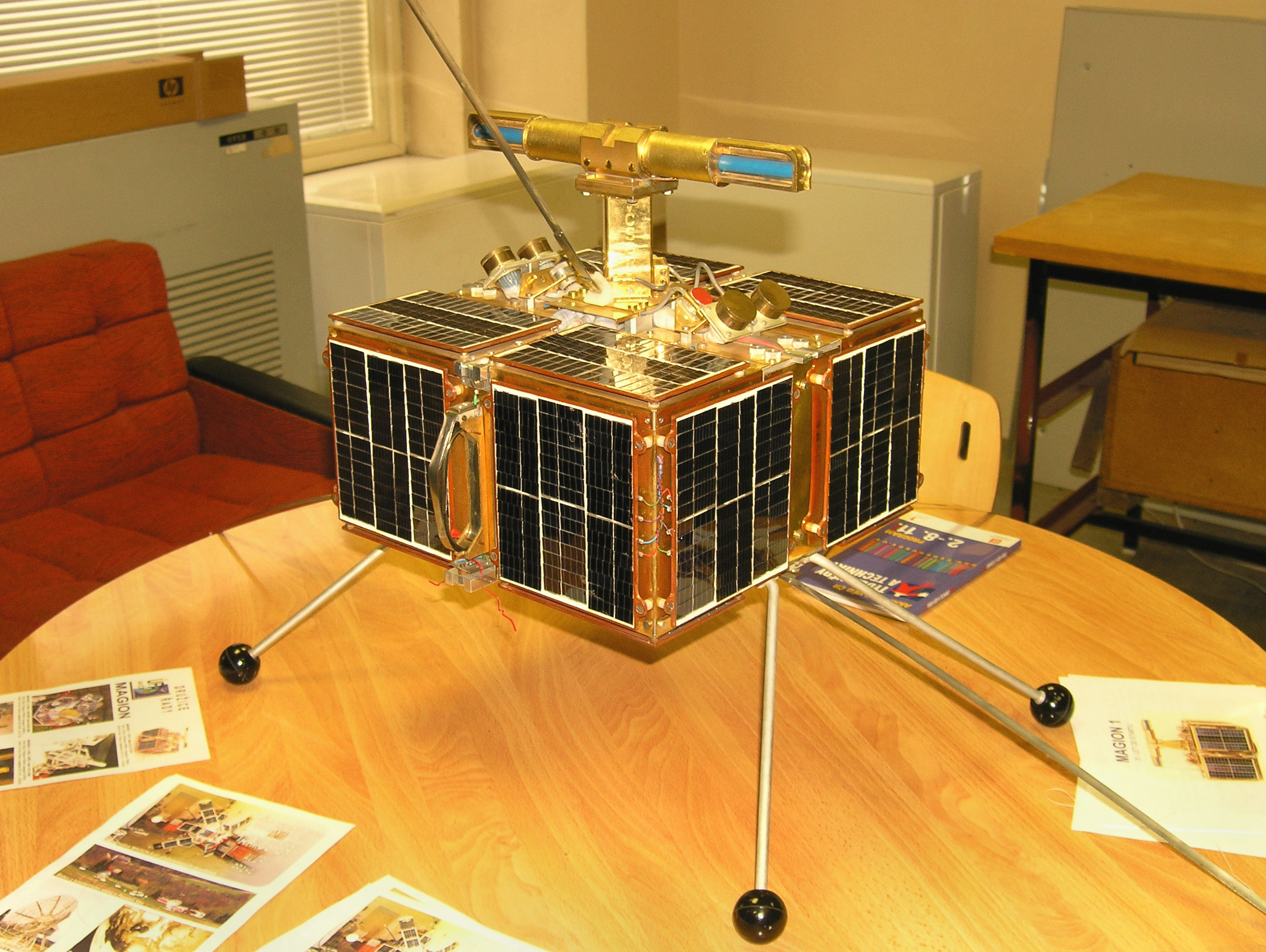
Magion 1

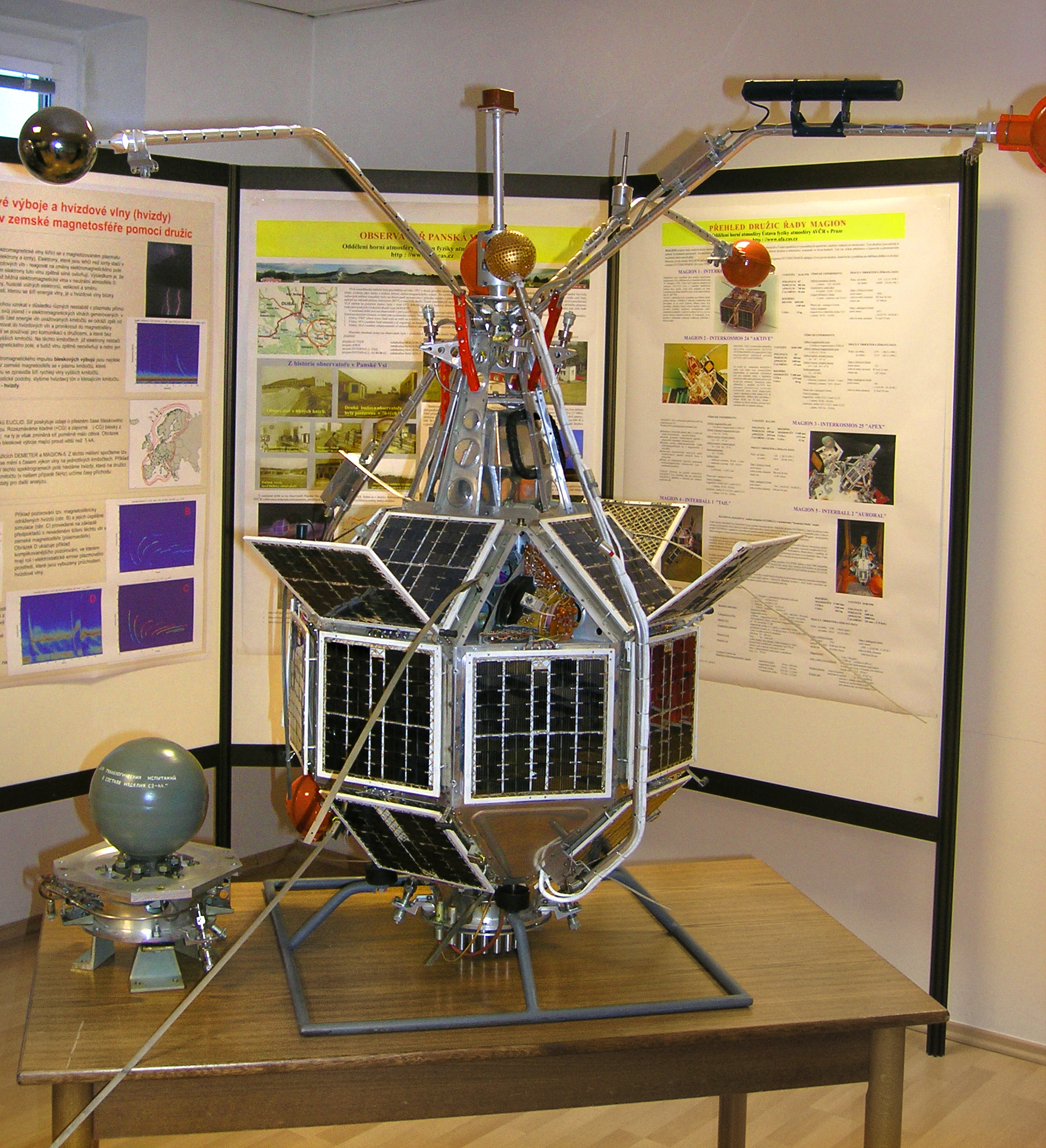
Magion 2 to 5

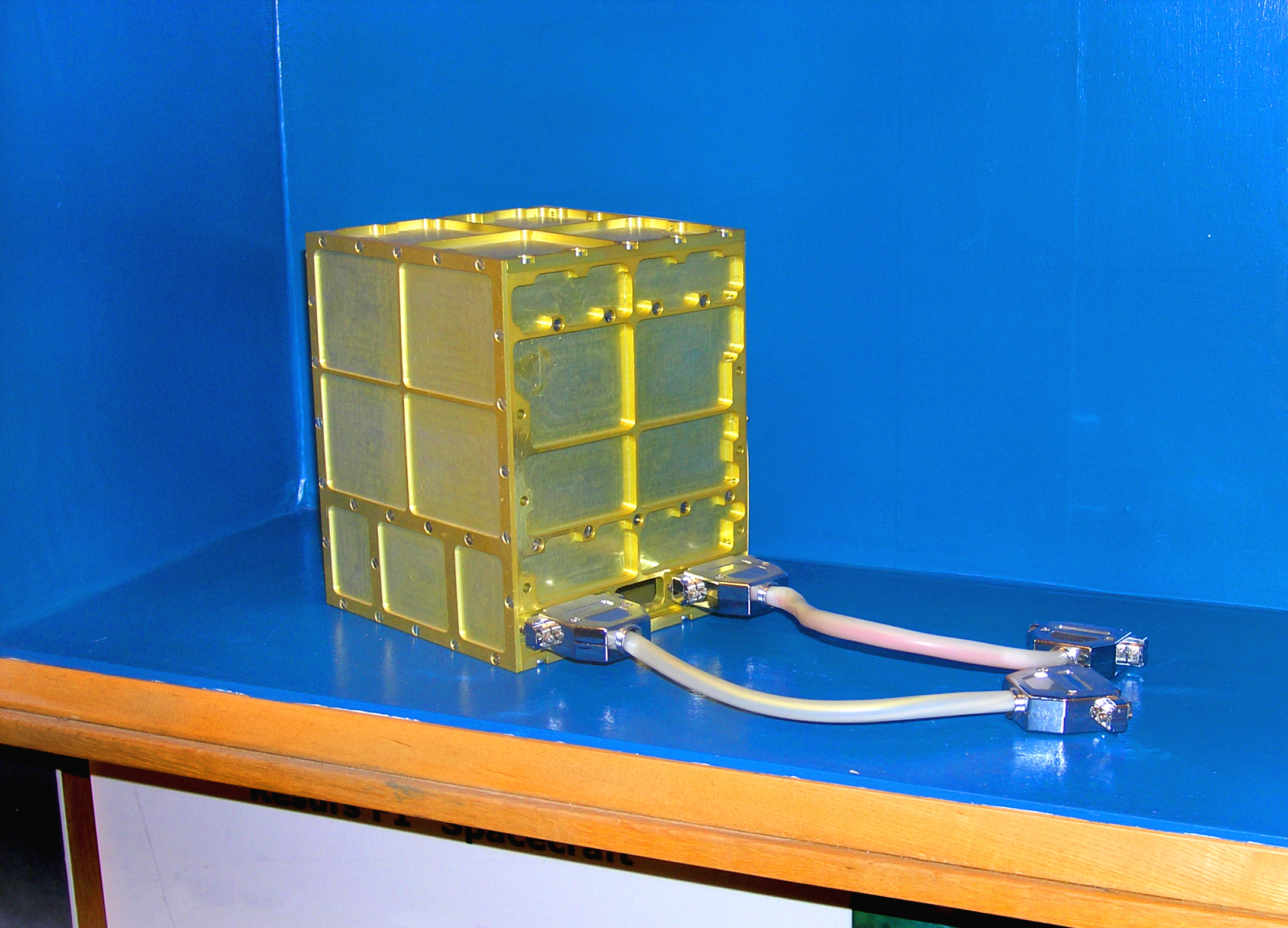
MACEK instrument

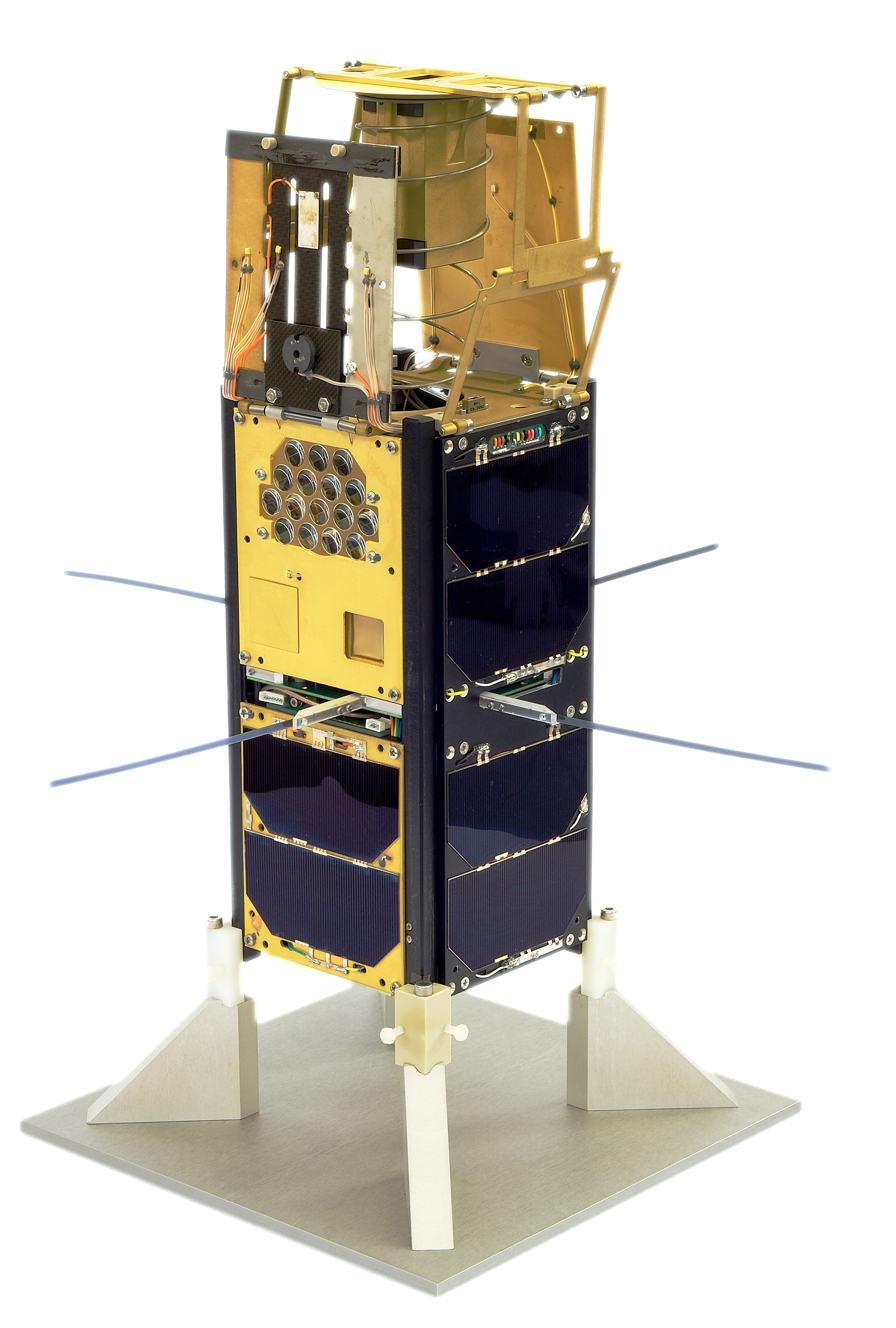
VZLUSAT-1

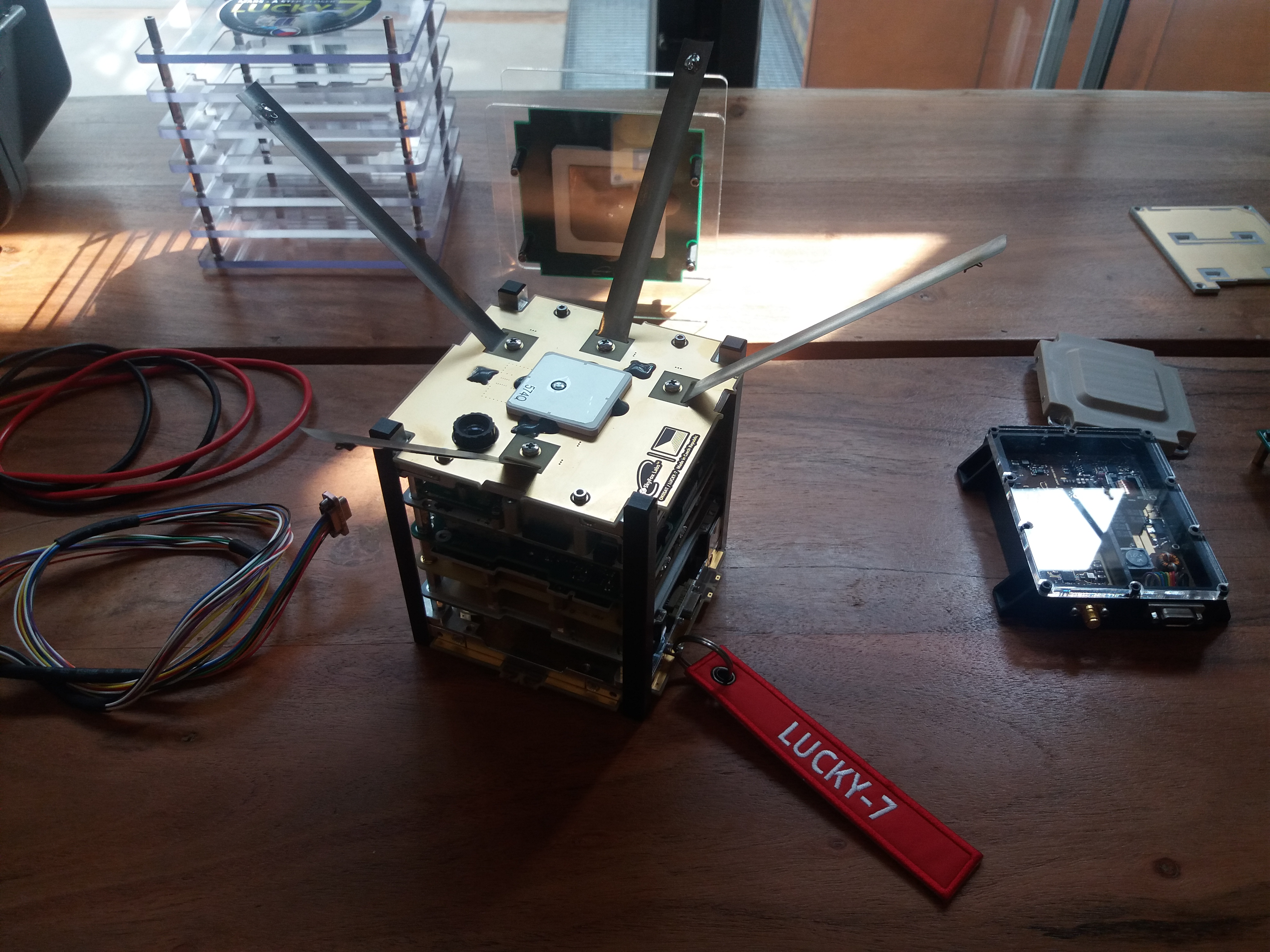
Lucky-7

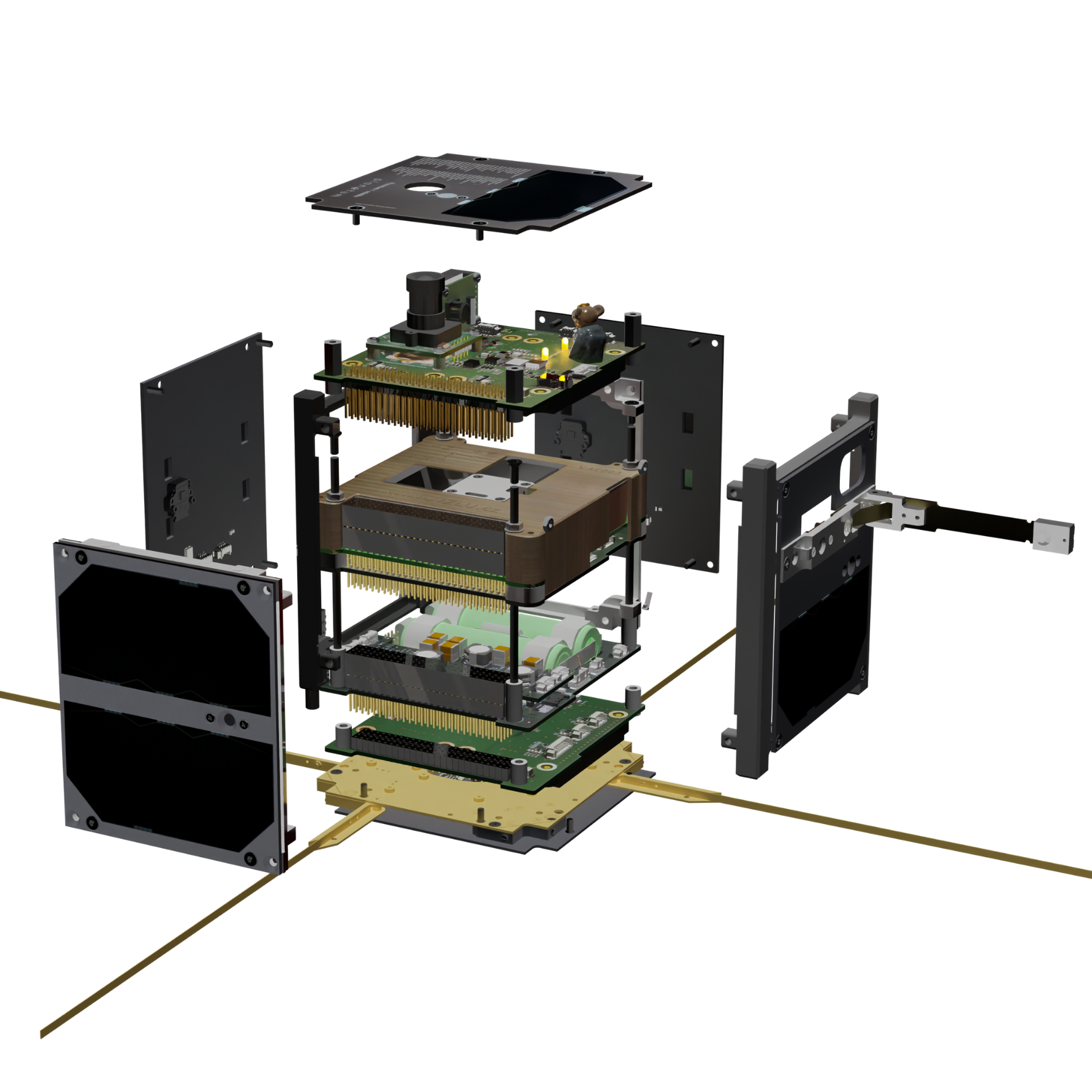
Planetum 1

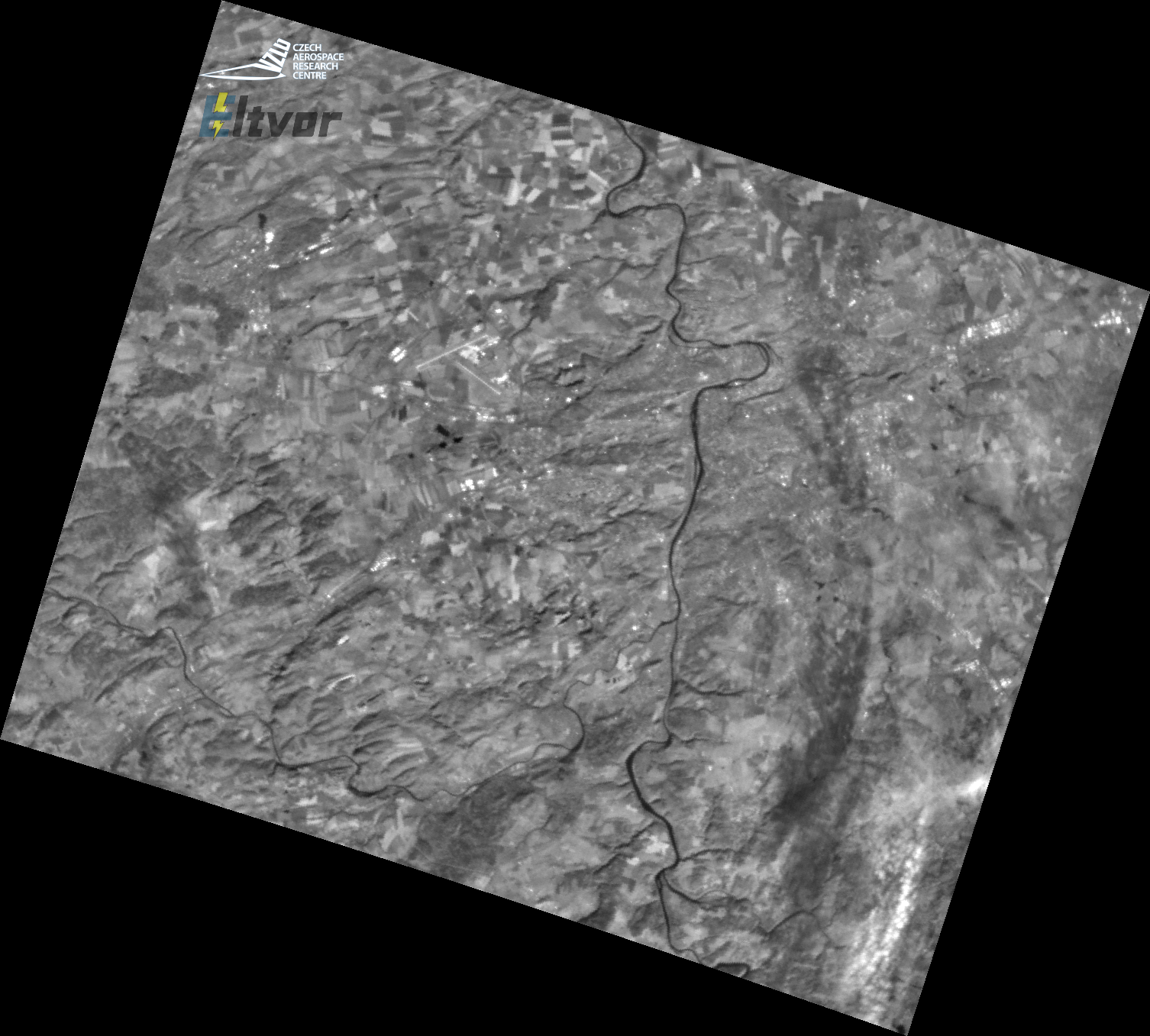
Prague by VZLUSAT-2

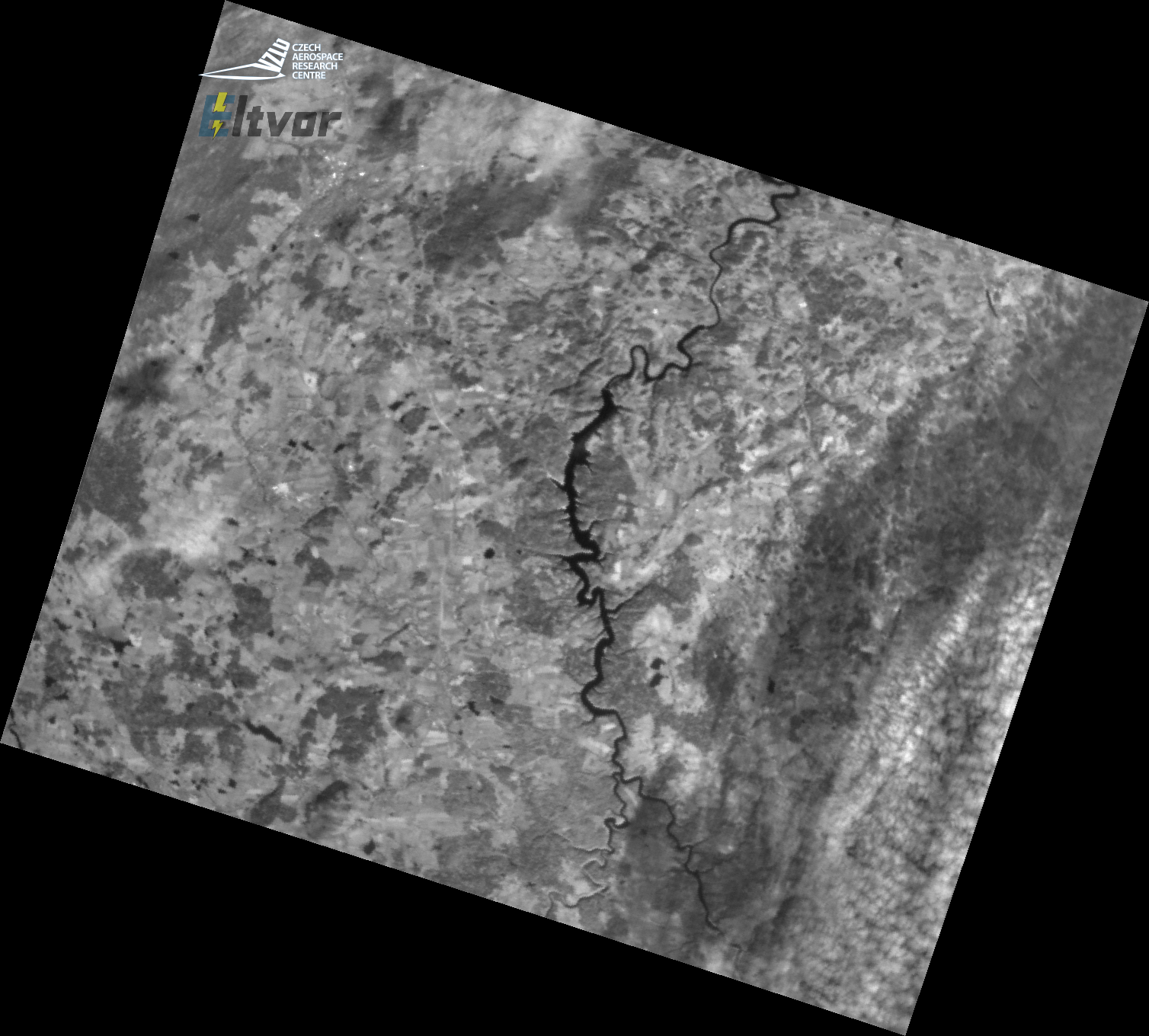
Orlík Reservoir by VZLUSAT-2

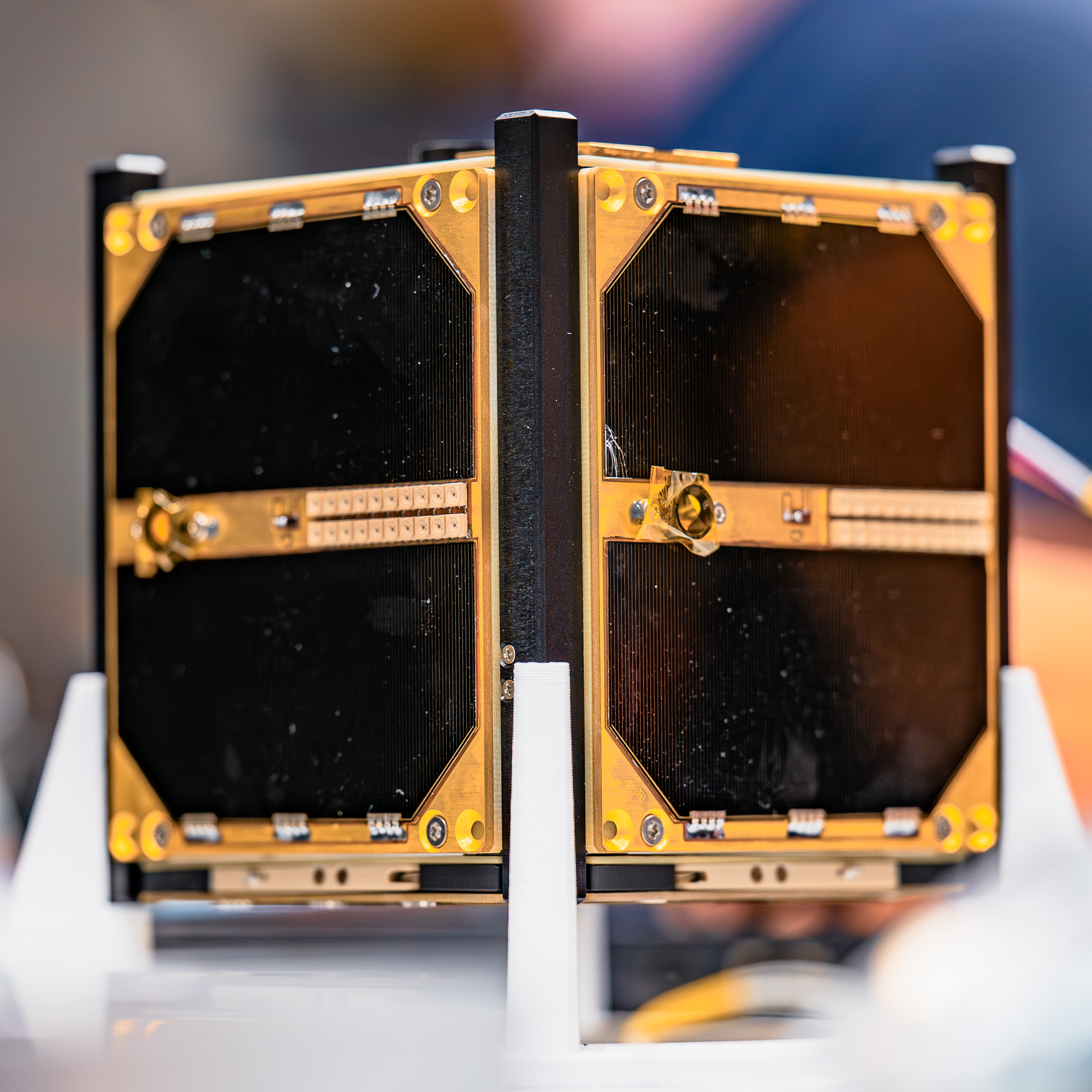
LASARsat

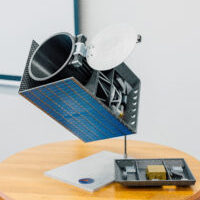
QUVIK

== See also ==
- List of Polish satellites
- List of Slovak satellites
- List of Slovenian satellites
- List of Ukrainian satellites
