= Magion =

Magion may refer to:

- Magion satellite series, a series of Czechoslovak research satellites
  - Magion 1, the first Czechoslovak satellite launched into orbit on October 24, 1978
- 2696 Magion, a main-belt asteroid discovered on April 16, 1980
- Magion (band), a Dutch band
