= DSB =

DSB may refer to:

== Science and technology ==
- Dictionary of Scientific Biography, a multivolume reference work edited by Charles Coulston Gillespie
- Double strand break, a break in both DNA strands, part of DNA repair
- Double-sideband transmission, in telecommunications
- Dsb, the warm-summer Mediterranean continental climate in the Köppen climate classification
- DsbA, a bacterial member of the Dsb (disulfide bond) family of enzymes

== Organizations ==
- De Surinaamsche Bank, Suriname
- Defense Science Board, of the United States
- Democrats for a Strong Bulgaria, a Bulgarian political party
- Department of Internal Security (ru:Главное управление собственной безопасности МВД России) or Departamenta sobstvennoi bezopasnosti of the Russian Ministry of Internal Affairs, an anticorruption and internal crime detection agency in Russia
- Deutsche Schallplatten Berlin, another name of VEB Deutsche Schallplatten
- Deutsche Schule Bratislava, a German international school in Bratislava, Slovakia
- Deutscher Schützenbund, the German Shooting and Archery Federation
- Dispute Settlement Body, of the World Trade Organization
- DSB (railway company) (Danske Statsbaner), a Danish train operating company
- DSB Bank (Dirk Scheringa Beheer), Netherlands
  - DSB Stadion, a football stadium in Alkmaar, Netherlands sponsored by DSB Bank
- DSB International School, a German school in Mumbai, India
- Dutch Safety Board, a Netherlands investigation agency
- German International School of Cairo (Deutsche Schule der Borromäerinnen Kairo), Egypt
- German School Beirut (Deutsche Schule Beirut), Lebanon
- Norwegian Directorate for Civil Protection (Direktoratet for samfunnssikkerhet og beredskap), a Norwegian government organization

== Other ==
- Dark square bishop, in chess
- Department Store Battles, a modification for Battlefield 2, a computer game
- Domestic Stability Buffer, a capital buffer set by a financial regulator in Canada requiring major domestic banks to keep some loan funds in reserve
- Don Salvador Benedicto, a municipality in the province of Negros Occidental, Philippines
- "Don't Stop Believin'", a song by American rock band Journey
- DSB, the ISO 639-2 or SIL International language code for the Lower Sorbian language - Dolnoserbski
