= BRNOsat =

Czech technology demonstration satellite

- Operator: Brno Observatory and Planetarium, Brno University of Technology, Masaryk University
- Website: www.brnoletidovesmiru.cz

Spacecraft properties
- Bus: 3U CubeSat
- Manufacturer: Spacemanic, VZLU Aerospace

Start of mission
- Launch date: 2027 (planned)

BRNOsat is a Czech educational and technology demonstration satellite under development by a consortium of institutions and companies mostly from Brno. The 3U CubeSat-type small satellite carries the LUVCam-2 telescope for UV astronomy developed by Masaryk University, Konkoly Observatory, and the Dunlap Institute. The telescope is based on the LUVCam-1 instrument aboard the Slovak satellite GRBBeta launched in 2024 and will demonstrate technologies for the future space telescope QUVIK. Other payloads aboard the satellite include experimental lubricants, labyrinth seals, and electronics developed by Brno University of Technology in cooperation with the European Space Agency. BRNOsat is expected to launch in 2027.

== See also ==
- List of Czech satellites
