= Veronika (satellite) =

Slovak satellite

- COSPAR ID: 2023-174F

Spacecraft properties
- Spacecraft type: 1U CubeSat
- Manufacturer: Spacemanic

Start of mission
- Launch date: 11 November 2023
- Rocket: Falcon 9

Veronika was a 1U CubeSat satellite commissioned by Slovak financier Boris Procik and built by Spacemanic. Named after Procik's daughter, it was Slovakia's first privately owned satellite and the world's first pink satellite. Veronika was Slovakia's third satellite in orbit after skCUBE and GRBAlpha.

== Background ==
Veronika was privately financed by Boris Procik as a symbolic and educational mission. It was manufactured by Spacemanic, with support from partners including the Technical University of Košice and Deutsche Schule Bratislava. The Slovak Space Office and ESA's rideshare partner Exolaunch facilitated the mission.

== History ==
Veronika was launched on 11 November 2023 aboard a Falcon 9 rocket as part of SpaceX's Transporter-9 rideshare mission. The satellite was deployed via Exolaunch's EXOpod Nova 16U deployer into a sun-synchronous orbit of approximately 550–600 km altitude. Ground communications were handled by the OM3KSI amateur radio club in Košice. Data from Veronika were made available via the SatNOGS network. The satellite ended its mission by reentering Earth atmosphere in August 2025.

== Mission Objectives ==
The satellite serves both amateur radio and educational purposes:

- Sends AX.25 telemetry, CW beacon, SSDV images, and digipeater messages
- Involves Slovak and Czech schools in communication experiments
- Broadcasts personalized messages from children and students

== Spacecraft Specifications ==
- Form Factor: 1U CubeSat
- Mass: ~1 kg
- Communications:
  - VHF/UHF amateur bands (~436.680 MHz)
  - Dual Murgas transceivers for multiple communication modes
- Payload:
  - Two onboard cameras
  - Experimental ADCS using electromagnetic actuators
  - GNSS receiver

== See also ==
- List of Slovak satellites
- List of CubeSats
- SpaceX Transporter missions
