= KOSTKA =

Czech educational satellite

- Operator: Brno University of Technology
- COSPAR ID: 2026-156BU
- SATCAT no.: 98395
- Website: cubesat.cz
- Mission duration: 2 years (planned)

Spacecraft properties
- Bus: 1U CubeSat

Start of mission
- Launch date: 7 July 2026, 7:12 UTC
- Rocket: Falcon 9 Transporter-17

KOSTKA (Czech for 'cube') is an educational and amateur radio satellite developed by the YSpace team from Brno University of Technology and launched in July 2026. The 1U CubeSat is the first Czech satellite designed and built entirely by students. KOSTKA serves as a precursor to YSpace's more ambitious mission CIMER designed to perform microbiological experiments in orbit.

== Objectives ==
The satellite is designed to test an innovative CubeSat antenna design, with which the team has won the ESA BIC Liftoff Challenge in 2025. Its mission is to measure UHF radio interference, transmit a radio beacon, serve as a digital repeater for radio amateurs, and transmit telemetry to various ground stations. Its designers also proposed to use the satellite to communicate with an automated meteorological station in Antarctica.

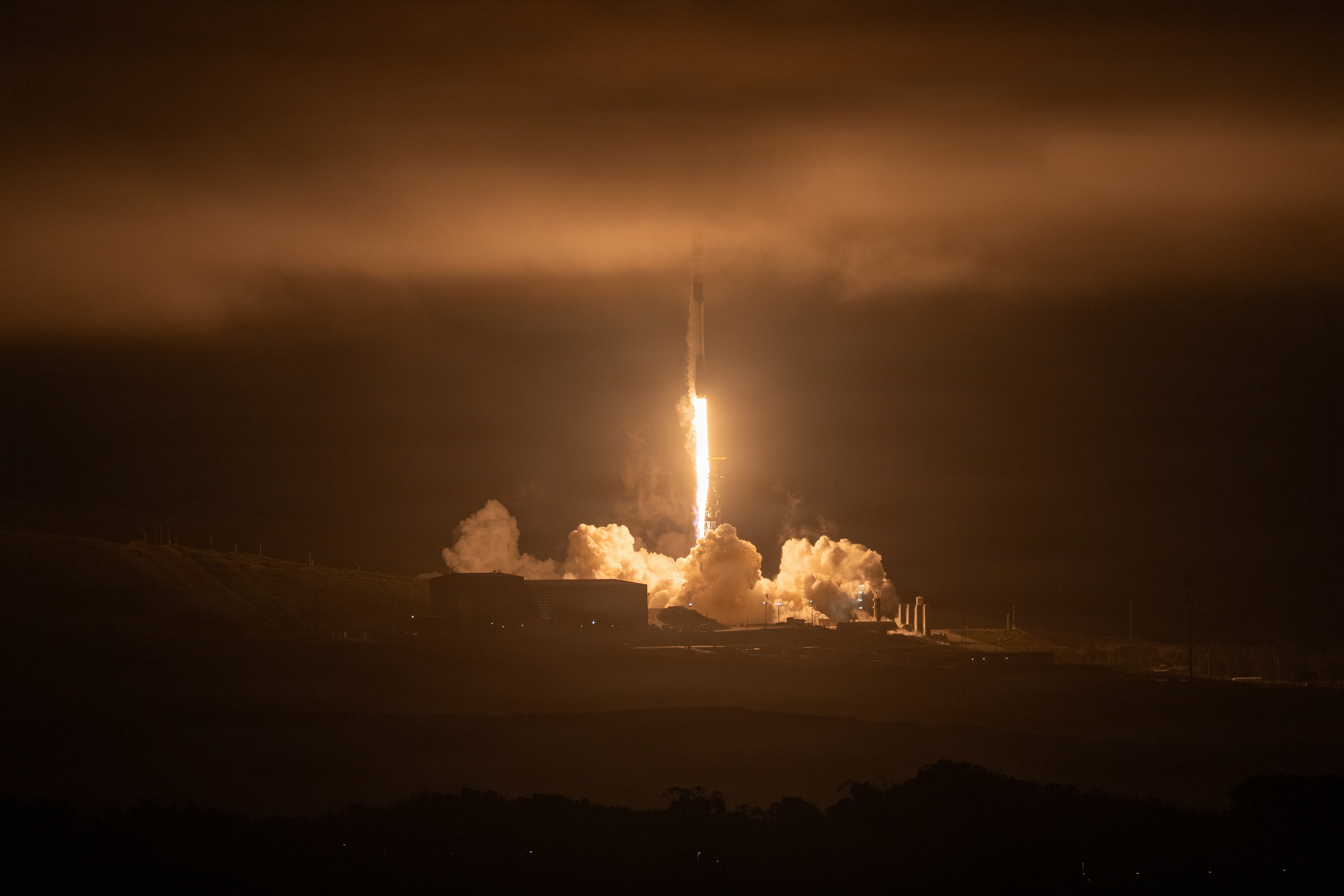
Launch of Transporter-17

== History ==
Work on the project started in 2023. In March 2026, the satellite has successfully passed its final tests. It was launched on 7 July 2026 on the Transporter-17 rideshare flight of Falcon 9 as the 17th Czech satellite. It was deployed at 8:04 UTC. One hour after deployment, the satellite's antenna successfully extended. Later during the day, the ground station on the roof of the Faculty of Electrical Engineering and Communication (FEEC) of Brno University of Technology received the first data from the satellite.

== See also ==
- List of Czech satellites
