= EARS (satellites) =

Future satellite constellation for GNSS radio occultation

- Manufacturer: Stellar Exploration, Spacemanic, Groundcom
- Country of origin: European Space Agency (Czech Republic) Czech republic

Specifications
- Bus: CubeSat

EARS (EArth Remote Sensing) is a future satellite constellation for atmospheric science under development by the Czech company Stellar Exploration, with the support of the European Space Agency's InCubed programme. Other companies involved in the project are Spacemanic and Groundcom. It is envisioned as a constellation of multiple nanosatellites using GNSS Radio Occultation for monitoring vertical profiles of temperature, pressure, humidity, and electron density in Earth atmosphere. Such data can be used in weather forecasting and climate research.

== See also ==
- List of Czech satellites
- List of European Space Agency programmes and missions
