= SSPA =

SSPA can refer to:

- Slovak Space Policy Association, a non-governmental organization
- South Sudan Patriotic Army
- State Secrets Protection Act, a bill proposed in the U.S. Congress in 2008
- Solid State Power Amplifier, a type of RF power amplifier that contains only solid-state (semiconductor) active devices

== See also ==
- SSPARS, Solid State Phased Array Radar System
