= CEVROSAT 2 =

Czech and Slovak space mission

- Operator: CEVRO University

Spacecraft properties
- Manufacturer: ČVC Electronic

Start of mission
- Launch date: 2027 (expected)
- Rocket: Falcon 9

CEVROSAT 2 is a future Czech and Slovak technology demonstration space mission under development by a consortium of academic institutions and companies from both countries led by the CEVRO University in Prague. The mission will consist of two identical small satellites, one for each country, carrying multiple in-orbit demonstration and validation (IOD/IOV) payloads. It builds upon the 2025 CEVROSAT 1 satellite project and is expected to cost up to CZK 120 million. The satellites are expected to be launch together on Falcon 9 in the second half of 2027.

== See also ==
- List of Czech satellites
- List of Slovak satellites
