= Radio occultation =

Remote sensing technique

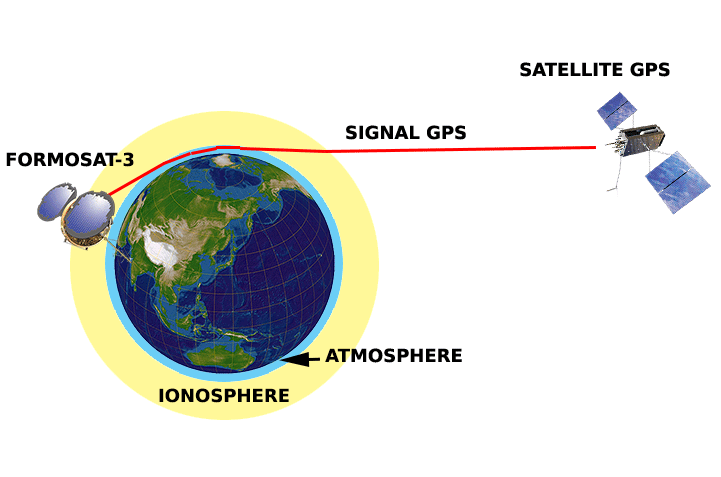
Radio occultation analysis of signal delay by the tandem FORMOSAT-3/COSMIC used as atmospheric sounding.

Radio occultation (RO) is a remote sensing technique used for measuring the physical properties of a planetary atmosphere or ring system. Satellites carrying onboard GNSS-Radio occultation instruments include CHAMP, GRACE and GRACE-FO, MetOp and the recently launched COSMIC-2.

== Atmospheric radio occultation ==
Atmospheric radio occultation relies on the detection of a change in a radio signal as it passes through a planet's atmosphere, i.e. as it is occulted by the atmosphere. When electromagnetic radiation passes through the atmosphere, it is refracted (or bent). The magnitude of the refraction depends on the gradient of refractivity normal to the path, which in turn depends on the density gradient. The effect is most pronounced when the radiation traverses a long atmospheric limb path. At radio frequencies the amount of bending cannot be measured directly; instead, the bending can be calculated using the Doppler shift of the signal given the geometry of the emitter and receiver. The amount of bending can be related to the refractive index by using an Abel transform on the formula relating bending angle to refractivity. In the case of the neutral atmosphere (below the ionosphere), information on the atmosphere's temperature, pressure and water vapor content can be derived, thus giving radio occultation data applications in meteorology.

== GNSS radio occultation ==
GNSS radio occultation (GNSS-RO), historically also known as GPS radio occultation (GPS-RO or GPSRO), is a type of radio occultation that relies on radio transmissions from GPS (Global Positioning System), or more generally from GNSS (Global Navigation Satellite System), satellites. This is a relatively new technique (first applied in 1995) for performing atmospheric measurements. It is used as a weather forecasting tool, and could also be harnessed in monitoring climate change. The technique involves a low-Earth-orbit satellite receiving a signal from a GNSS satellite. The signal has to pass through the atmosphere and gets refracted along the way. The magnitude of the refraction depends on the temperature and water vapor concentration in the atmosphere.

GNSS radio occultation amounts to an almost instantaneous depiction of the atmospheric state. The relative position between the GNSS satellite and the low-Earth-orbit satellite changes over time, allowing for a vertical scanning of successive layers of the atmosphere.

GNSS-RO observations can also be conducted from aircraft or on high mountaintops.

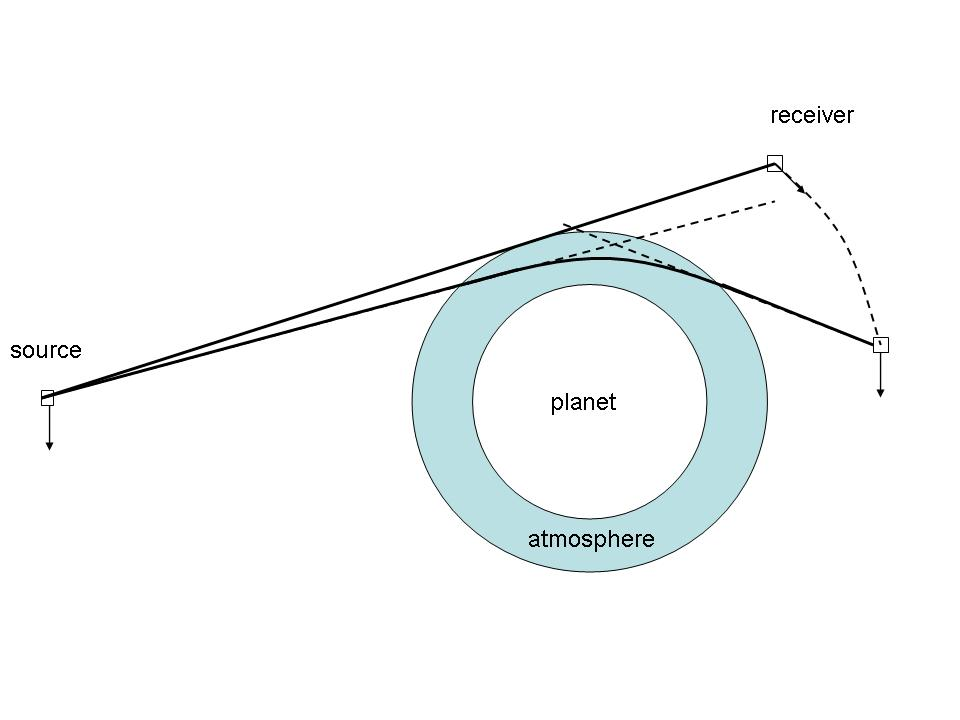
Illustration of radio occultation

== Planetary satellite missions ==
Current missions include REX on New Horizons.

== Satellite missions ==
- CLARREO
- Microlab 1
- FORMOSAT-3/COSMIC
- FORMOSAT-7/COSMIC-2
- CHAMP
- GRACE
- Oceansat
- RO instrument onboard Sentinel-6 Michael Freilich
- GRAS instrument onboard MetOp satellites
- Spire LEMUR cubesats
- PlanetiQ GNOMES smallsats
- Yunyao 1
- EARS

== See also ==
- Atmospheric limb sounding
- Bistatic radar
