= Ladislav Brožek =

Slovak astronomer

Minor planets discovered: 23
see § List of discovered minor planets

Ladislav Brožek (born 1952) is a Slovak astronomer. At the Bohemian Kleť Observatory, he discovered a total of 23 minor planets between 1979 and 1982, as credited by the Minor Planet Center.

One of his discoveries, the main-belt asteroid 2613 Plzeň, he named after his birthplace Plzeň. In 1981, he discovered 3102 Krok, a near-Earth object of the Apollo group. He also named another of his discoveries, 3834 Zappafrank, in memory of rock musician and composer Frank Zappa (1940–1993).

== List of discovered minor planets ==
2288 Karolinum	19 October 1979	list
2613 Plzeň	30 August 1979	list
2622 Bolzano	9 February 1981	list
2696 Magion	16 April 1980	list
3102 Krok	21 August 1981	list
3386 Klementinum	16 March 1980	list
3419 Guth	8 May 1981	list
3423 Slouka	9 February 1981	list
3424 Nušl	14 February 1982	list
3603 Gajdušek	5 September 1981	list
3834 Zappafrank	11 May 1980	list
4023 Jarník	25 October 1981	list

4146 Rudolfinum	16 February 1982	list
4190 Kvasnica	11 May 1980	list
4369 Seifert	30 July 1982	list
5221 Fabribudweis	16 March 1980	list
5417 Solovaya	24 August 1981	list
6076 Plavec	14 February 1980	list
6765 Fibonacci	20 January 1982	list
7739 Čech	14 February 1982	list
(10035) 1982 DC_{2}	16 February 1982	list
(16393) 1981 QS	24 August 1981	list
27675 Paulmaley	2 February 1981	list
Note: Ladislav Brožek made no co-discoveries

== See also ==
- List of minor planet discoverers § L. Brozek
