= 2613 Plzeň =

Asteroid

Discovery
- Discovered by: L. Brožek
- Discovery site: Kleť Obs.
- Discovery date: 30 August 1979

Designations
- Named after: Plzeň (Czech city)
- Alternative designations: 1979 QE · 1969 XA
- Minor planet category: main-belt · (outer)

Orbital characteristics
- Epoch 4 September 2017 (JD 2458000.5)
- Uncertainty parameter 0
- Observation arc: 47.16 yr (17,224 days)
- Aphelion: 3.1789 AU
- Perihelion: 2.9028 AU
- Semi-major axis: 3.0408 AU
- Eccentricity: 0.0454
- Orbital period (sidereal): 5.30 yr (1,937 days)
- Mean anomaly: 310.56°
- Mean motion: 0° 11^{m} 9.24^{s} / day
- Inclination: 13.017°
- Longitude of ascending node: 277.58°
- Argument of perihelion: 192.11°

Physical characteristics
- Dimensions: 22±9 km (generic); 28.007±0.132 km 28.18 km (IRAS:3)
- Geometric albedo: 0.0737 (IRAS:3); 0.077±0.010
- Absolute magnitude (H): 11.4

2613 Plzeň, provisional designation 1979 QE, is an asteroid from the outer region of the asteroid belt, approximately 28 kilometers in diameter. It was discovered on 30 August 1979, by Czech astronomer Ladislav Brožek at the South Bohemian Kleť Observatory in the Czech Republic. It was later named for the Czech city of Plzeň.

== Orbit and classification ==
Plzeň orbits the Sun in the outer main-belt at a distance of 2.9–3.2 AU once every 5 years and 4 months (1,937 days). Its orbit has an eccentricity of 0.05 and an inclination of 13° with respect to the ecliptic. It was first identified as 1969 XA at Crimea-Nauchnij in 1969. However, Plzeň's observation arc begins with its discovery observation in 1979, as its first identification remained unused.

== Physical characteristics ==
According to three observations made by the Infrared Astronomical Satellite IRAS and based on observations made by NASA's Wide-field Infrared Survey Explorer with its subsequent NEOWISE mission, the asteroid measures 28.0 and 28.2 kilometers in diameter and its surface has an albedo of 0.074 and 0.077, which is a typical albedo carbonaceous asteroids. Based on its absolute magnitude of 11.4, its mean-diameter is between 13 and 32 kilometers, assuming an albedo in the range of 0.05 to 0.25, which covers both stony and carbonaceous types.

As of 2016, Plzeň's spectral type, surface composition, rotation period and shape remain unknown.

== Naming ==
This minor planet was named in honour of the Czech city of Plzeň, birthplace of the discoverer. The official naming citation was published on 28 January 1983 (M.P.C. 7619).
