= 3102 Krok =

Rare-type asteroid and slow rotator

Discovery
- Discovered by: L. Brožek
- Discovery site: Kleť Obs.
- Discovery date: 21 August 1981

Designations
- Named after: Duke Krok (legendary Czech figure)
- Alternative designations: 1981 QA
- Minor planet category: NEO · Amor

Orbital characteristics
- Epoch 16 February 2017 (JD 2457800.5)
- Uncertainty parameter 0
- Observation arc: 35.44 yr (12,944 days)
- Aphelion: 3.1174 AU
- Perihelion: 1.1839 AU
- Semi-major axis: 2.1506 AU
- Eccentricity: 0.4495
- Orbital period (sidereal): 3.15 yr (1,152 days)
- Mean anomaly: 86.843°
- Mean motion: 0° 18^{m} 45^{s} / day
- Inclination: 8.4439°
- Longitude of ascending node: 172.09°
- Argument of perihelion: 154.78°
- Earth MOID: 0.1840 AU · 71.7 LD

Physical characteristics
- Dimensions: 1.48 km (derived); 1.6 km
- Synodic rotation period: 147.8±0.3 h 149.4±1 h 151.8
- Geometric albedo: 0.20 (assumed)
- Spectral type: QRS (Tholen); S (SMASS); Sqw · QRS; B–V = 0.834; U–B = 0.521
- Absolute magnitude (H): 16.14±0.2 (R) · 16.2 · 16.40±0.15 · 16.47±0.35 · 16.524±0.15

3102 Krok, provisional designation 1981 QA, is a rare-type asteroid and slow rotator, classified as a near-Earth object of the Amor group, that measures approximately 1.5 kilometers in diameter.

It was discovered on 21 August 1981, by Slovak astronomer Ladislav Brožek at Kleť Observatory in the Czech Republic. The asteroid was named after Duke Krok, a legendary Czech figure.

== Classification and orbit ==
Krok orbits the Sun at a distance of 1.2–3.1 AU once every 3 years and 2 months (1,152 days). Its orbit has an eccentricity of 0.45 and an inclination of 8° with respect to the ecliptic. The body's observation arc begins with its official discovery observation at Klet, as no precoveries were taken and no prior identifications were made.

It has an Earth minimum orbital intersection distance of 0.1840 AU (27,500,000 km), which translates into 71.7 lunar distances.

== Physical characteristics ==
In the Tholen classification, Krok is characterized as a rare QRS-type. In the SMASS taxonomy it is classified as a common S-type asteroid, and the "ExploreNEOs" Warm Spitzer program assigns a transitional Sqw-type. The R- and Q-types also belong to the larger group of stony asteroids.

=== Rotation and shape ===
In September 1991, a first rotational lightcurve of Krok was obtained by American astronomer Alan Harris. Lightcurve analysis gave an exceptionally long rotation period of 147.8 hours with a brightness amplitude of 1.0 magnitude, which indicates that the body has a non-spheroidal shape (U=3).

Between 2000 and 2005, several photometric observations made by Czech astronomer Petr Pravec gave a similar period between 149.4 and 151.8 and an amplitude of 0.7 to 1.3 (U=3/3-). This makes Krok as slow rotator.

=== Diameter and albedo ===
According to Tom Gehrels' 1994 publication "Hazards due to Comets and Asteroids", Krok measures 1.6 kilometers in diameter based on a generic surface albedo of 0.15, while the Collaborative Asteroid Lightcurve Link assumes a standard albedo for stony S-type asteroids of 0.20 and calculates a diameter of 1.48 kilometers with an absolute magnitude of 16.5.

== Naming ==
This minor planet was named after Duke Krok, a legendary figure in Czech history, and the first judge ("duke") of the Slavonic tribes in ancient Bohemia. He was also the father of Princess Libuše, who, together with her husband Přemysl founded the Přemyslid dynasty of Czech royalty. The official naming citation was published on 18 December 1994 (M.P.C. 24410).
