= MACEK =

Czech space accelerometer instrument

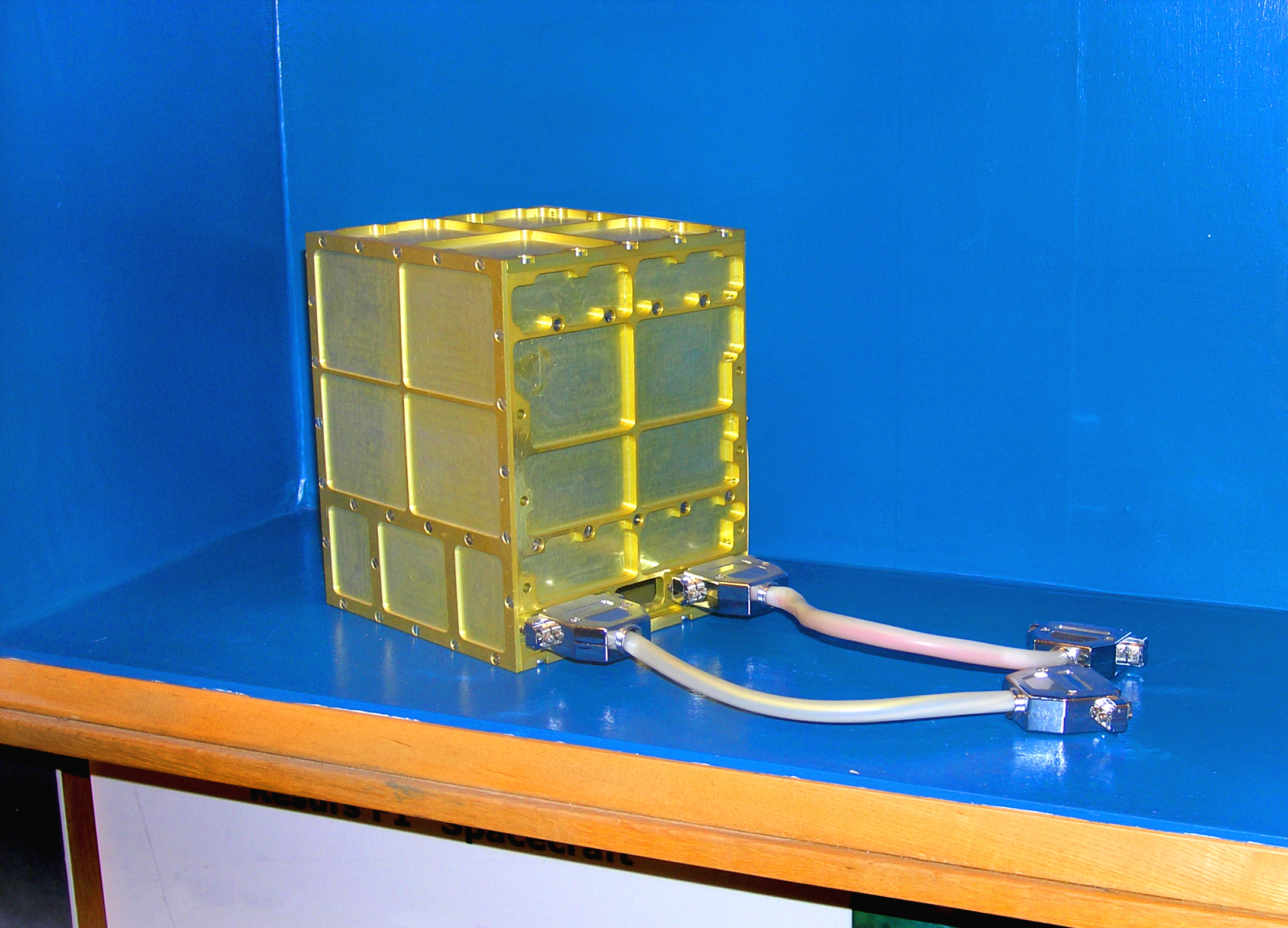
- Operator: (Czech Republic) Astronomical Institute of CAS
- Instrument type: Accelerometer

Properties
- Number launched: 3

Host spacecraft
- COSPAR ID: 1992-033A; 1996-057A; 2003-031B

MACEK (or MAC-03) is a microaccelerometer instrument developed by the Astronomical Institute of the Czech Academy of Sciences for measuring non-gravitational perturbations in spaceflight such as atmospheric drag and lift or radiation pressure. Iterations of the instrument flew on three orbital missions: the Russian satellite Resurs-F15 in 1992, the Space Shuttle flight STS-79 in 1996, and the Czech satellite MIMOSA in 2003. The asteroid 29555 MACEK, discovered at Kleť Observatory in 1998, was named after this instrument.

== See also ==
- List of Czech satellites
- FREYA – Czech scientific hyperspectral camera
