= Lucky-7 =

Czech technology demonstration satellite

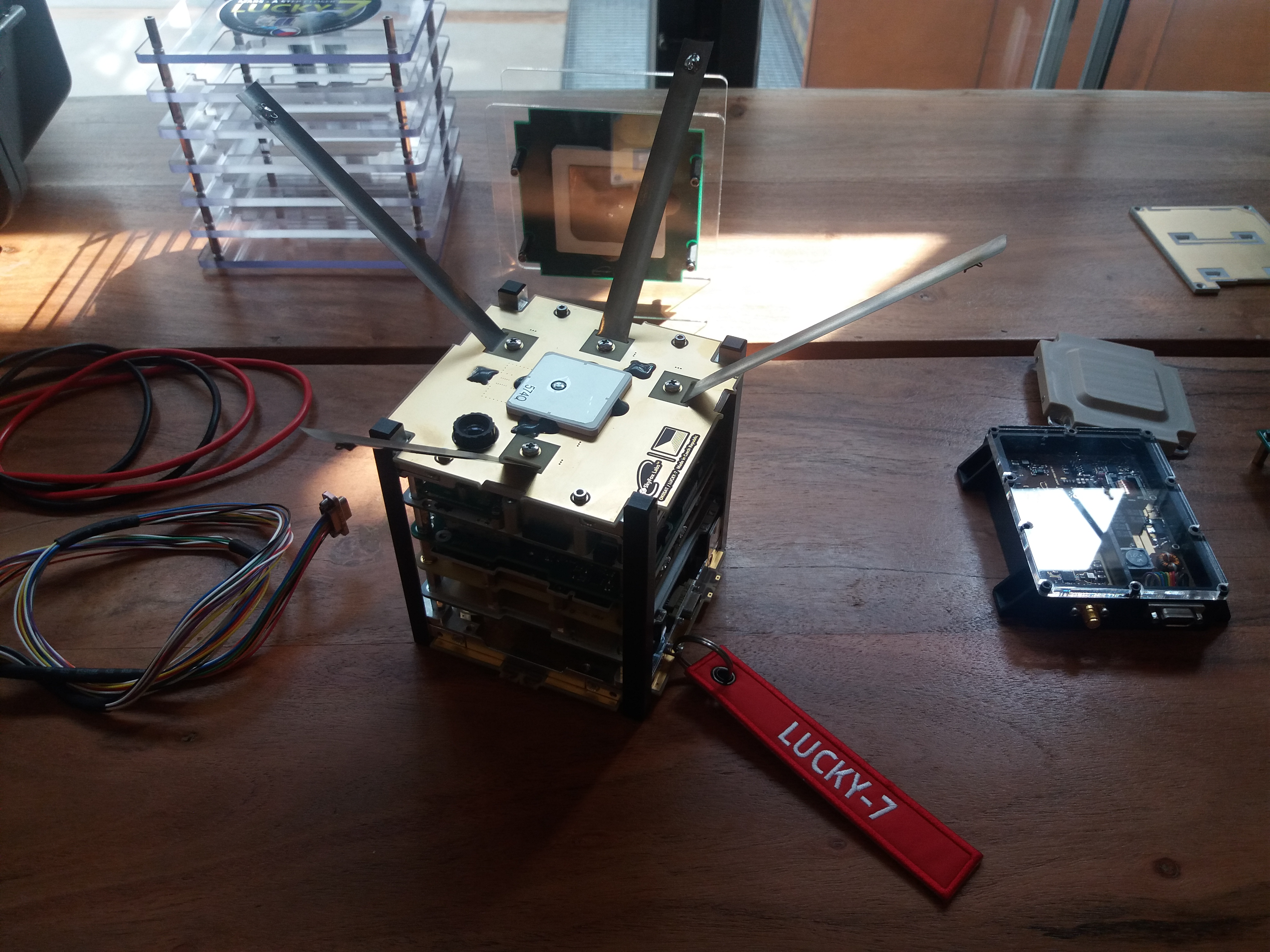
- Operator: SkyFox Labs
- COSPAR ID: 2019-038W
- SATCAT no.: 44406
- Website: www.lucky7satellite.org

Spacecraft properties
- Spacecraft type: 1U CubeSat

Start of mission
- Launch date: 5 July 2019
- Rocket: Soyuz-2-1b

End of mission
- Decay date: 21 December 2024

Lucky-7 was a technology demonstration satellite developed by the Czech team SkyFox Labs associated with the Czech Technical University. The 1U CubeSat-type satellite was testing various commercial off the shelf electronic components in space environment. The satellite was launched by a Soyuz-2-1b rocket on 5 July 2019 to the quasi-synchronous polar orbit, operated successfully in space, and ended its mission with destructive re-entry on 21 December 2024.
