= CIMER =

Czech technology demonstration satellite

- Operator: Brno University of Technology, Mendel University in Brno
- Website: www.vut.cz/en/yspace/mission-cimer

Spacecraft properties
- Bus: 3U CubeSat

Start of mission
- Launch date: 2027 (planned)

CIMER (Cyanobacteria In Microgravity Environment Research) is a future microbiology-focused technology demonstration satellite under development by the YSpace team from Brno University of Technology with the support of the Fly Your Satellite! programme of the European Space Agency. Its mission is to test the usefulness of desiccative hibernation for cultivation of cyanobacteria in space environment with possible applications in life support systems. The experimental payload "MIBICO" containing the microbes is being developed by Mendel University in Brno. The 3U CubeSat is expected to launch in late 2027.

== See also ==
- List of Czech satellites
