= List of Slovak satellites =

This list covers all artificial satellites built and operated by institutions or companies from Slovakia.

Launched
#	Name	COSPAR ID	Purpose	Consortium	Launch date	Launch vehicle	Launch site	Ref
1	skCube	2017-036AA	Technology demonstration, atmospheric science	Slovak Organization for Space Activities	23 June 2017	PSLV-XL	Sriharikota	
2	GRBAlpha	2021-022AD	Astronomy (gamma-ray bursts)	Konkoly Observatory, Technical University of Košice, Masaryk University, Hiroshima University, Hungarian Academy of Sciences	22 March 2021	Soyuz-2	Baikonur	
3	Veronika	2023-174F	Education	Boris Procik, Spacemanic	11 November 2023	Falcon 9	SLC-4E	
4	GRBBeta	2024-128C	Astronomy (gamma-ray bursts)	Konkoly Observatory, Technical University of Košice, Masaryk University, Hiroshima University, Ministry of Education, Research, Development and Youth of the Slovak Republic	9 July 2024	Ariane 62	Kourou	
5	MARINA	2026-156BD	Space weather, amateur radio	Satellites with Meaning, Technical University of Košice, ADVASPACE Radiation Data, Spacemanic	7 July 2026	Falcon 9 Transporter-17	SLC-4E	

Future
Name	Purpose	Consortium	Launch date	Launch vehicle	Launch site	Ref
CEVROSAT 2	Technology demonstration	CEVRO University, Stellar Space, Slovak Space Office, ČVC Electronic	2027			
FEIsat	Technology demonstration	ESA, Slovak University of Technology in Bratislava				

== Gallery ==
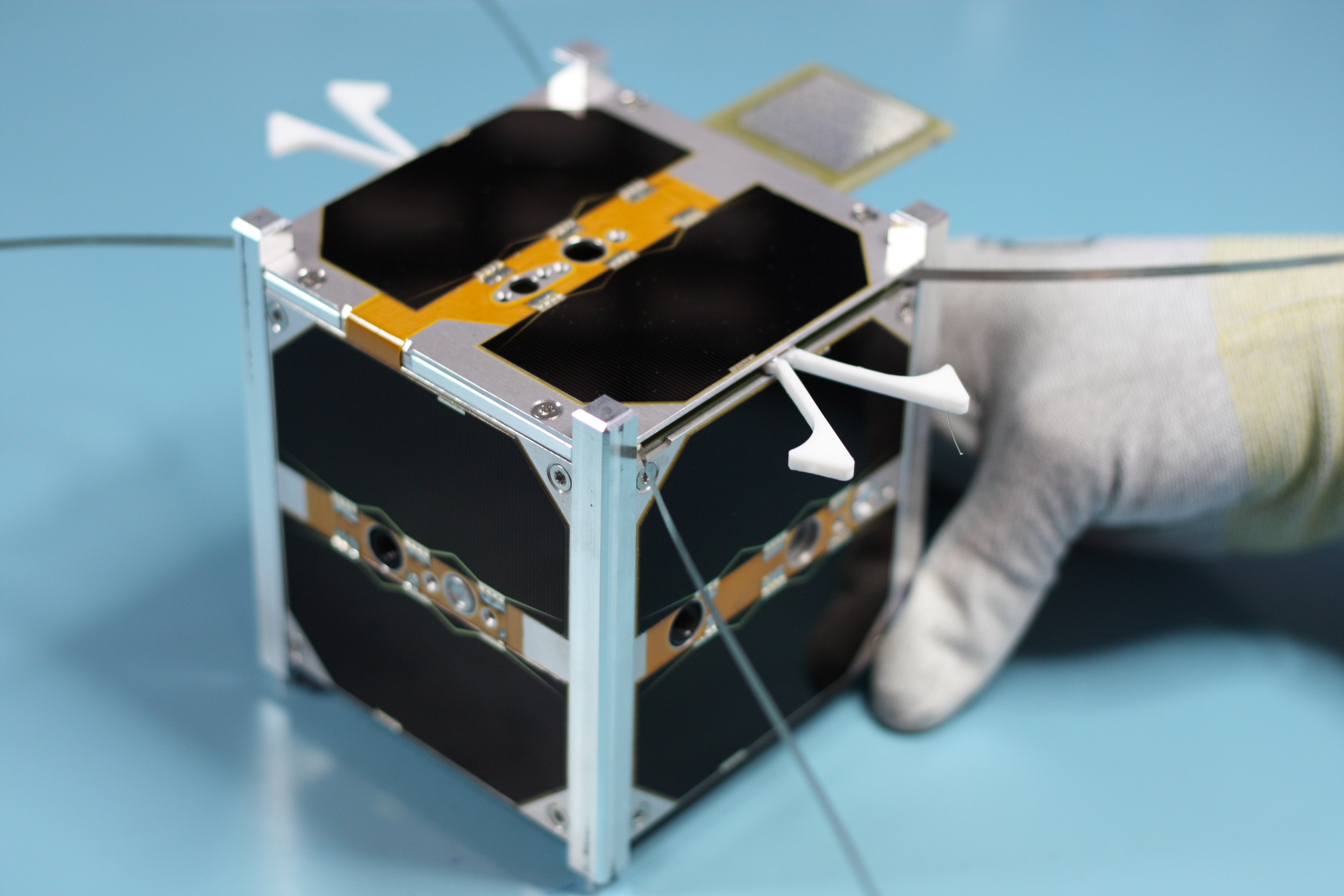
SkCube

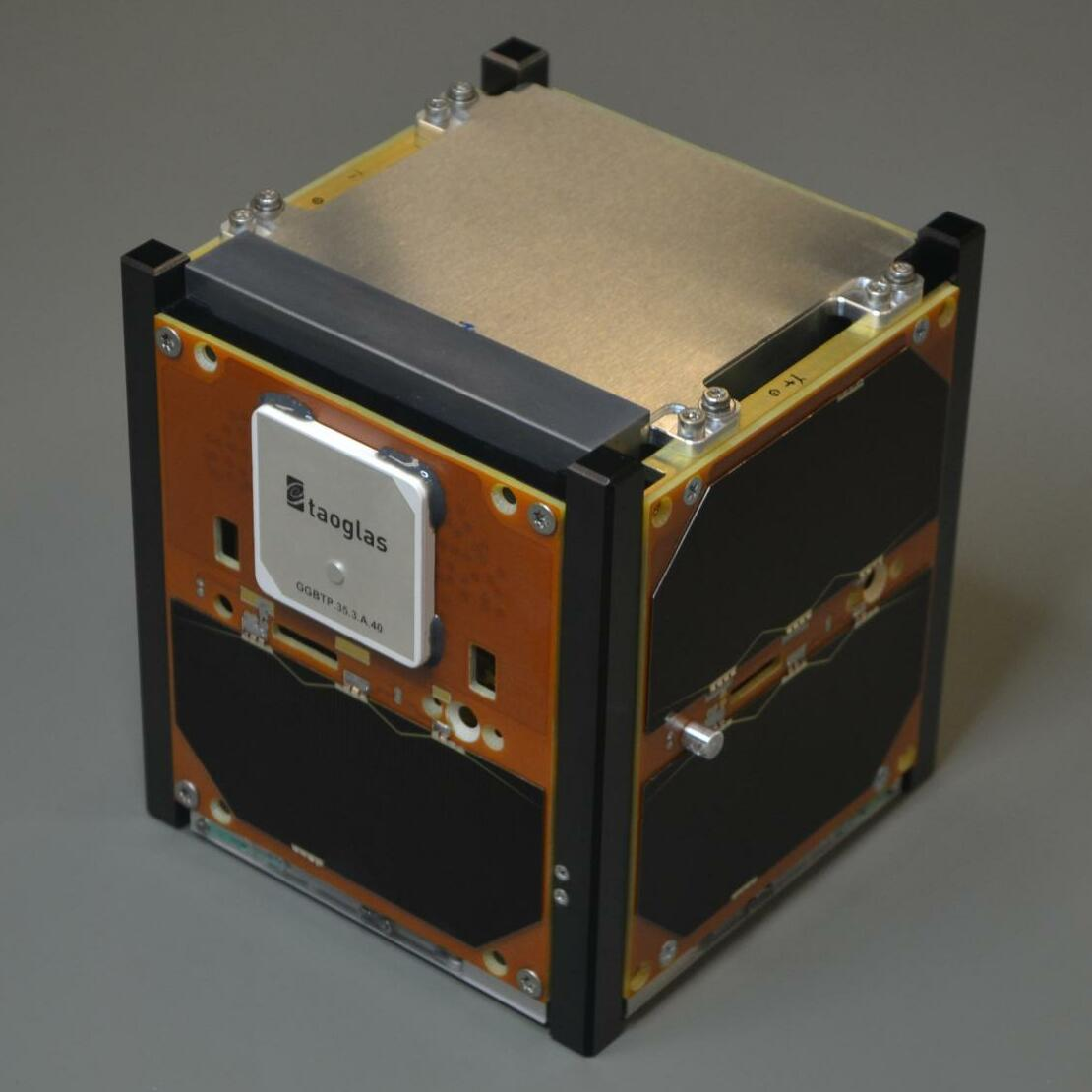
GRBAlpha

== See also ==
- Slovak Organization for Space Activities
- Slovak Space Policy Association
- List of Czech satellites
- List of Polish satellites
- List of Slovenian satellites
- List of Ukrainian satellites
