= MIMOSA =

Czech scientific microsatellite

- Organization: Academy of Sciences of the Czech Republic
- Contractor: Space Devices
- Mission Type: Atmospheric science
- Launch: June 30, 2003 on Rockot
- Launch site: Plesetsk Cosmodrome
- Mission duration: 18 months (calculated)
- Mass: 66 kg (146 lb)
- Webpage: www.asu.cas.cz/english/new/MIMOSA/

Orbital elements
- Semi-major axis: 6,948.57 km (4,317.64 mi)
- Eccentricity: 0.036
- Inclination: 96.80°
- Orbital Period: 96.07 minutes
- Right ascension of the ascending node: 60°

Instruments
- Accelerometer: 3-axis micro-accelerometer for measuring non-gravitational forces, accurate to about 10^{−11} ms^{−2}

MIMOSA (Micromeasurements of Satellite Acceleration), COSPAR 2003-031B, was a Czech scientific microsatellite. The satellite was nearly spherical with 28 sides and carried a microaccelerometer (MACEK) to monitor the atmospheric density profile by sensing the atmospheric drag on the approximated sphere.

MIMOSA was launched on 30 June 2003, alongside other miniature satellites including MOST and several CubeSat-based satellites. It was delivered to an eccentric orbit, with an initial perigee of 320 km (200 mi) and apogee of 845 km (525 mi). The satellite never became fully functional due to several technical problems on board. It is no longer in orbit. NORAD reported it burnt in the atmosphere on 11 December 2011.

== See also ==
- 2003 in spaceflight
