= Spacemanic =

Czech aerospace company

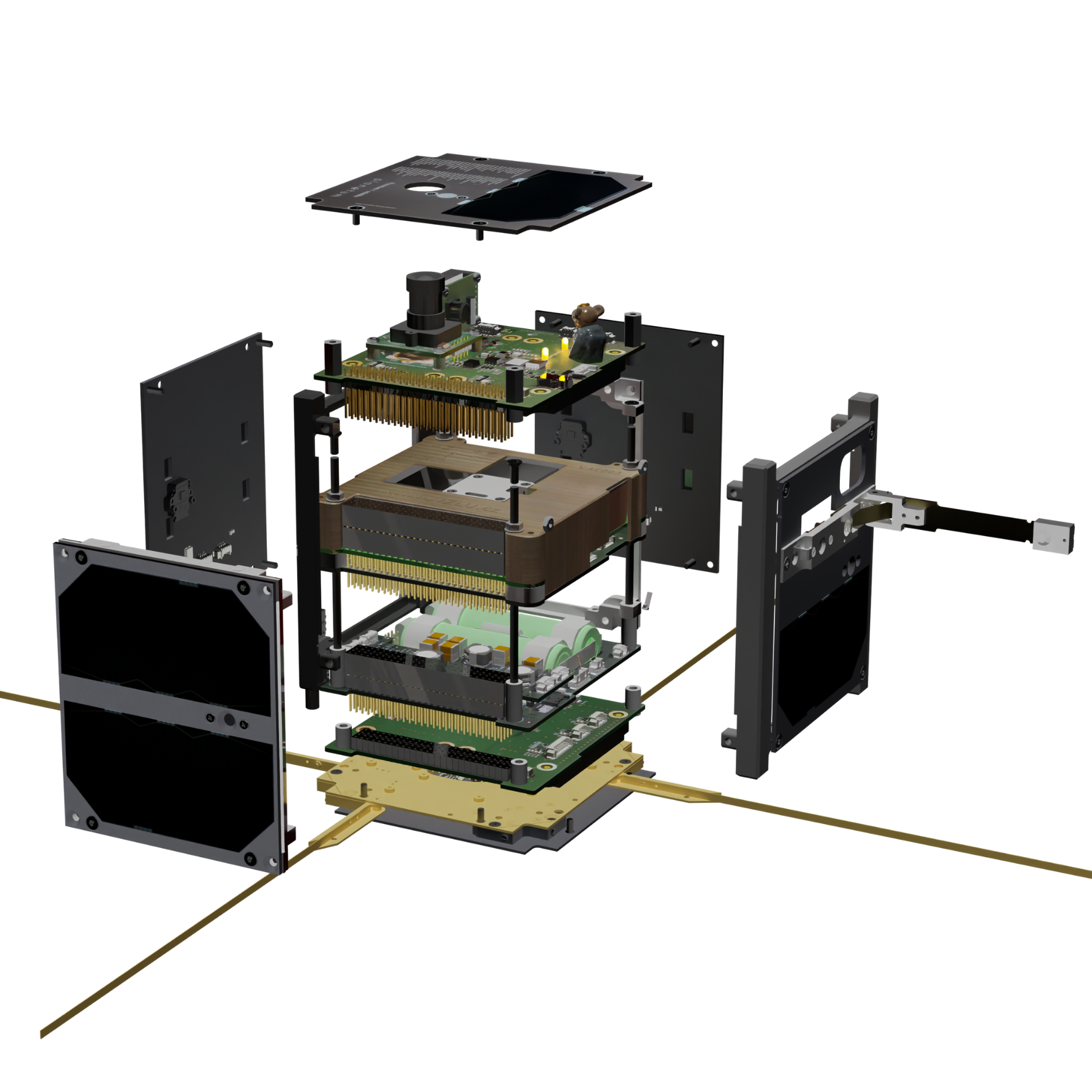
- Planetum-1 satellite by Spacemanic
- Type: Private
- Industry: Aerospace engineering
- Founded: 2017
- Headquarters: Brno
- Website: spacemanic.com

Spacemanic is a Czech aerospace company specializing in developing small satellites as well as associated hardware and services. Its initial team was founded in 2014 in Bratislava, Slovakia during the development of the first Slovak satellite skCUBE but later relocated to Brno, Czechia. The company was supported by the European Space Agency (ESA). Spacemanic built the first Croatian satellite CroCube as wall as multiple Czech and Slovak satellites.

== Missions ==
List of space missions by Spacemanic
Name	COSPAR ID	Purpose	Launch date
GRBAlpha	2021-022AD	Astronomy (gamma-ray bursts)	22 March 2021
BDSAT	2022-033U	Amateur radio, technology demonstration	1 April 2022
Planetum-1	2022-057G	Education	25 May 2022
BDSAT-2	2023-001CT	Amateur radio, technology demonstration	3 January 2023
Veronika	2023-174F	Education	11 November 2023
LASARsat	2024-247Q	Technology demonstration	21 December 2024
CroCube	2024-247T	Education	21 December 2024
GRBBeta	2024-128C	Astronomy (gamma-ray bursts)	9 July 2024
MARINA	2026-156BD	Space weather, amateur radio	7 July 2026

== See also ==
- List of Czech satellites
- List of Slovak satellites
- List of first satellites by country
- Slovak Organisation for Space Activities
- VZLU Aerospace – Czech aerospace company
