= LASARsat =

Czech technology demonstration satellite

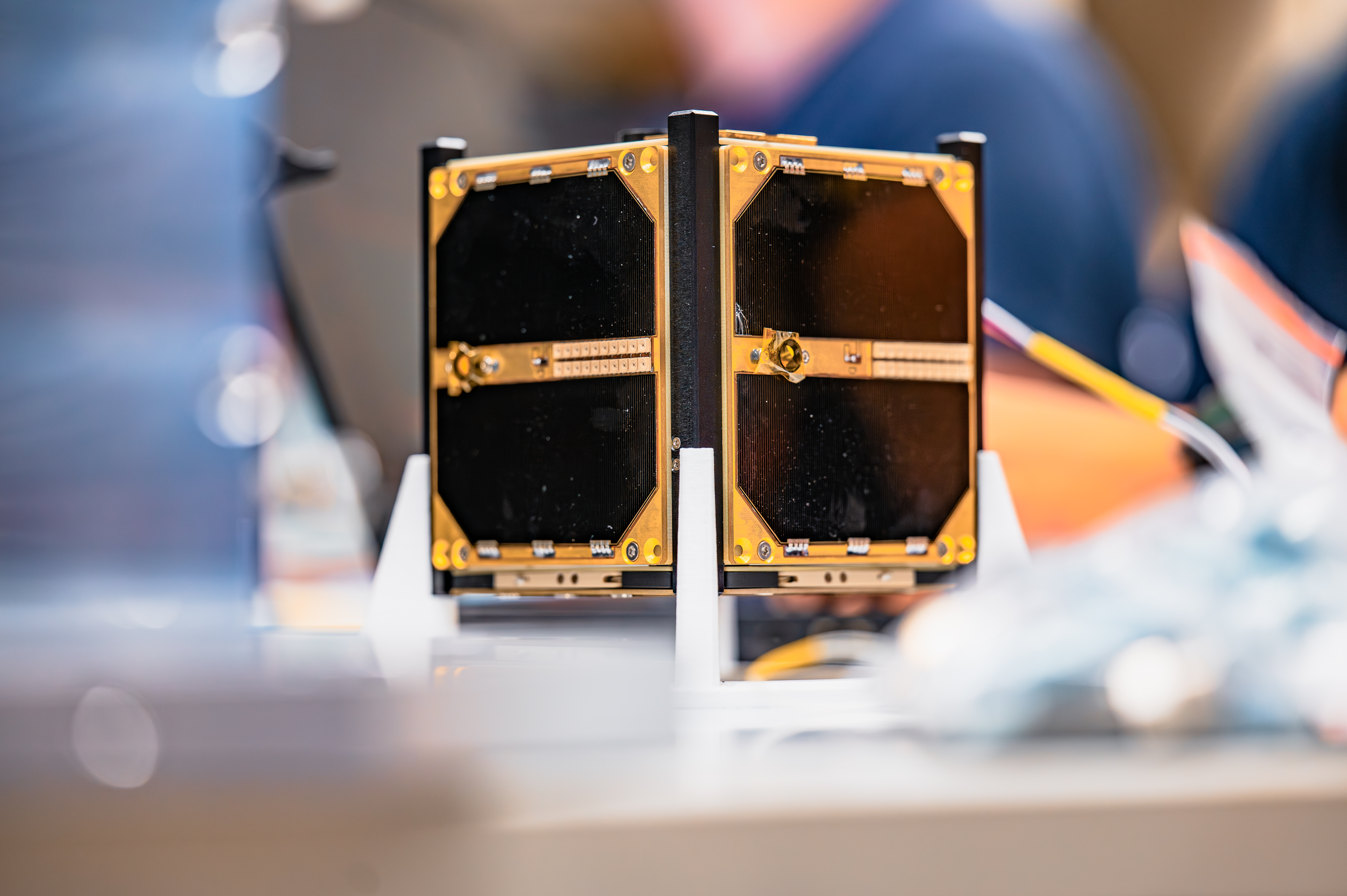
- Mission type: Technology
- Operator: LASAR by DoSpace, Planetum
- COSPAR ID: 2024-247Q
- SATCAT no.: 62391
- Website: https://lasar.info

Spacecraft properties
- Manufacturer: Spacemanic; HiLASE; VZLU AEROSPACE; SkyFox Labs
- Dry mass: 1.2 kilograms
- Dimensions: 10x10x11.3 centimeters

Start of mission
- Launch date: December 21, 2024, 11:34:24 UTC
- Rocket: Falcon 9
- Contractor: SpaceX

Orbital parameters
- Altitude: 500 – 600 kilometers
- Inclination: 45.5 degrees
- Period: 96 minutes
Instruments
- Photodiodes: Series of photodiodes
- LEDs: Series of LED
- Reflectors: Reflectors
- Langmuir probe: Langmuir probe
- Earthcam: Earth surveillance camera
- Dosimeters: Two dosimeters

LASARsat (Laser-Assisted Satellite Reentry satellite) is a Czech scientific microsatellite, which was launched on 21 December 2024. The LASARsat mission is a continuation of the Czech high school team LASAR, which won the Conrad Challenge, a global STEM competition held in Houston. The satellite is designed to test the possibilities of using high-power lasers for traffic management in orbit and to help to solve the problem of space debris. LASARsat is 1U specification CubeSat, with dimensions of 10×10×11.3 cm and total volume of 1000 cubic centimeters. The satellite was launched into a Low Earth orbit by SpaceX's Falcon 9 on the Bandwagon-2 mission.

== Payload ==
The satellite has control, energy and communication equipment on board, the latter being designed for amateur radio contact. LASARsat is also carrying a small capsule with non-alcoholic Czech beer.

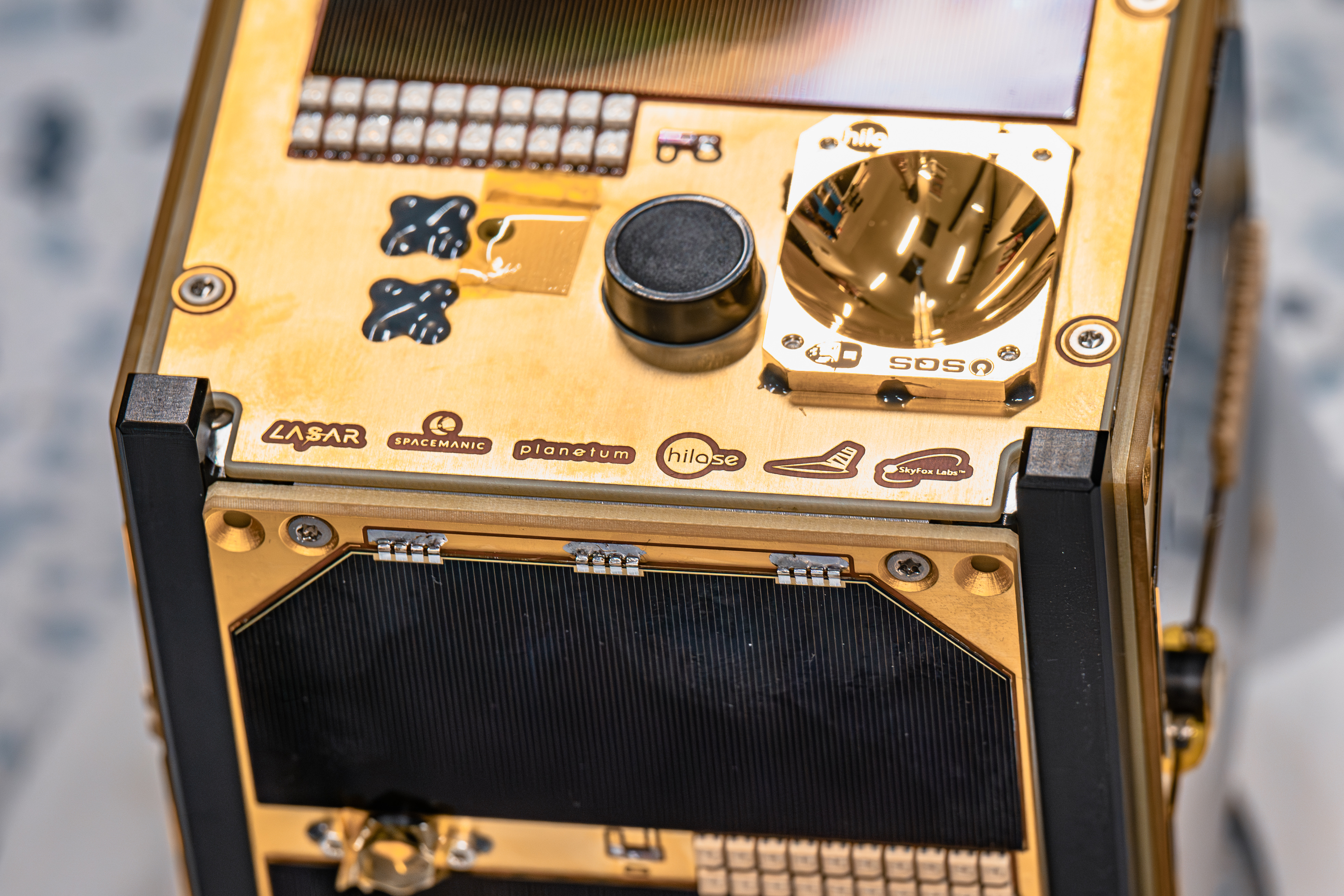
Detail of LASARsat and its instruments. Retroreflector and the series of photodiodes can be seen.

Seven scientific instruments are on board LASARsat:

- Photodiodes for measuring the laser's energy losses in Earth's atmosphere
- Series of light-emitting diodes (LEDs) for improving tracking accuracy
- Retroreflectors for reflecting the laser beam back to Earth's surface to allow its further study
- Langmuir probe for measuring changes in ionization upon laser's impact
- Earthcam, a camera for capturing the Earth's surface, on which the effects of the laser beam on optical sensors are tested
- Two dosimeters, one supplied by Czech Aerospace Research Centre and the other one by SkyFox Labs
