= Slovak Space Policy Association =

- Type: non-governmental organization
- Registration no.: 45791287
- Location(s): Kuzmányho 1 974 01 Banská Bystrica Slovakia
- Website: www.vesmirnapolitika.sk/en

Slovak Space Policy Association (SSPA) is a non-governmental organization, which deals with space security, law and economic aspects of the peaceful uses of outer space. It is the only fully professional think tank in the area of space policy in Slovakia. Its main mission is to promote public discussion on space-related themes that affect society, science and research, economy, and also foreign and security policy objectives of Slovakia. SSPA publishes its own in-house publication SSPA Reports, which has been granted ISSN 2585-755X.

SSPA works on the policy, security and legal aspects of the use of outer space and publishes both in professional and scientific journals, and members lecture at international conferences and congresses. SSPA members have conducted several work-related stays and internships in various institutions, such as the European Space Agency (ESA), National Aeronautics and Space Administration (NASA), European Centre for Space Law (ECSL), European Space Policy Institute (ESPI), European Commission and United Nations Office for Outer Space Affairs (UN OOSA). Additionally SSPA is (through its members) a national point of contact for the Space Generation Advisory Council (SGAC) and a member of a regional think-tanks network in the framework of the IRSEC Hub project.

== See also ==
- List of Slovak satellites
