= 2696 Magion =

Main-belt asteroid

Discovery
- Discovered by: L. Brožek
- Discovery site: Kleť Obs.
- Discovery date: 16 April 1980

Designations
- Named after: Magion 1 (Czechoslovak satellite)
- Alternative designations: 1980 HB · 1951 SK; 1953 GC · 1978 TN_{7}
- Minor planet category: main-belt · (inner) background · Phocaea

Orbital characteristics
- Epoch 23 March 2018 (JD 2458200.5)
- Uncertainty parameter 0
- Observation arc: 66.41 yr (24,255 d)
- Aphelion: 2.7287 AU
- Perihelion: 2.1712 AU
- Semi-major axis: 2.4499 AU
- Eccentricity: 0.1138
- Orbital period (sidereal): 3.83 yr (1,401 d)
- Mean anomaly: 35.557°
- Mean motion: 0° 15^{m} 25.2^{s} / day
- Inclination: 25.350°
- Longitude of ascending node: 186.23°
- Argument of perihelion: 283.31°

Physical characteristics
- Mean diameter: 10.06 km (calculated); 20.18±1.0 km 20.83±5.49 km 21.388±0.121 km 22.74±0.53 km 23.824±8.215 km 25.418±0.186 km
- Synodic rotation period: 480±6 h (Note: Lightcurve plot of (2696) Magion taken by Galad and Pravec at Modra in June 2007, with an ambiguous rotation period 474 (or 350) hours. Quality code of 2. Summary figures at the LCDB.)
- Geometric albedo: 0.0345±0.0036; 0.038±0.004; 0.04±0.03; 0.0421±0.0397; 0.054±0.003; 0.0687±0.008; 0.23 (assumed)
- Spectral type: X · S (assumed)
- Absolute magnitude (H): 12.00; 12.20; 12.39; 12.48±0.02

2696 Magion, provisional designation 1980 HB, is a dark background asteroid and a slow rotator from the inner regions of the asteroid belt, approximately 21 kilometers (13 miles) in diameter. It was discovered on 16 April 1980, by Slovak astronomer Ladislav Brožek at the Kleť Observatory in former Czechoslovakia. The X-type asteroid has an ambiguous rotation period of 480 hours and is possibly a tumbler. It was named for the first Czechoslovak satellite, Magion 1, launched in 1978.

== Orbit and classification ==
Magion is a non-family asteroid of the main belt's background population when applying the hierarchical clustering method to its proper orbital elements. Based on osculating Keplerian orbital elements, the asteroid has also been considered a member of the Phocaea family (701), a large family with two thousand members, named after 25 Phocaea.

It orbits the Sun in the inner asteroid belt at a distance of 2.2–2.7 AU once every 3 years and 10 months (1,401 days; semi-major axis of 2.45 AU). Its orbit has an eccentricity of 0.11 and an inclination of 25° with respect to the ecliptic. The body's observation arc begins with its first observation as 1951 SK at Goethe Link Observatory in September 1951, more than 28 years prior to its official discovery observation at Kleť.

== Physical characteristics ==
Magion has been characterized as an X-type asteroid by Pan-STARRS large-scale survey. It is also an assumed S-type asteroid based on its family classification.

=== Rotation period and slow rotator ===
In May 2007, a rotational lightcurve of Magion was obtained from photometric observations by astronomers Adrián Galád, Leonard Kornoš and Štefan Gajdoš at Modra Observatory in Slovakia. Lightcurve analysis gave an exceptionally long but ambiguous rotation period of 480±6 hours with a brightness amplitude of 0.31 magnitude (U=2). Alternative periods are 474 and 360 hours, respectively. Due to its long period, this slow rotator ranks among to the Top 100 of its kind. It may also be a tumbler, yet no strong evidence has been found (T0). (Note: PAR = 0. See (2696) Magion at the LCDB. Definition by the LCDB for PAR = 0: The tumbling damping time scale is long enough that tumbling might be expected, but observations are not sufficient to substantiate either tumbling or not tumbling (from NOTES (single letter flag(s)).)

=== Diameter and albedo ===
According to the surveys carried out by the Infrared Astronomical Satellite IRAS, the Japanese Akari satellite and the NEOWISE mission of NASA's Wide-field Infrared Survey Explorer, Magion measures between 20.18 and 25.418 kilometers in diameter and its surface has an albedo between 0.0345 and 0.0687.

The Collaborative Asteroid Lightcurve Link assumes a high albedo of 0.23 – derived from 25 Phocaea, the parent body of the Phocaea family – and consequently calculates a much smaller diameter of 10.06 kilometers based on an absolute magnitude of 12.2.

== Naming ==
This minor planet was named after "Magion 1", the first Czechoslovak artificial satellite, launched with Interkosmos 18 mission on 24 October 1978. The satellite studied the interactions between Earth's magnetosphere and its ionosphere, and it examined the special structure of extremely low frequency waves. The official naming citation was published by the Minor Planet Center on 28 January 1983 (M.P.C. 7620).
