= Magion (band) =

Dutch band

- Origin: The Hague, Netherlands
- Genres: Symphonic gothic metal
- Years active: 2005–2014
- Past members: Myrthe van Beest; Chris Vrij; Arjen van der Toorn; Joop de Rooij; Menno Bruggeling; David de Waal; Walter Romberg; David Gutierrez Rojas; Nienke Verboom
- Website: www.magionband.com

Magion was a Dutch symphonic metal band from The Hague, existing from 2005 to 2014. The band released two albums, an EP and two demos, and performed with bands such as Epica, Delain, Trail of Tears & Jorn. The album "Close to Eternity" was mastered by the Swedish rock/metal producer and musician Dan Swanö. Through the years the popularity of the group gradually grew, peaking late 2013 after the release of their second album "A Different Shade of Darkness", which generated various media attention and resulted in a performance at the 11th edition of the annual Metal Female Voices Fest in Belgium, late 2013. The band split up after disagreements in the spring of 2014.

== Discography ==
Studio albums

- 2010: Close to Eternity
- 2013: A Different Shade of Darkness

EPs

- 2009: Promo 2009 (EP)

== Band members ==
- Myrthe van Beest (Scenario II, ex-Slander, Fayx) - vocals (2005-2014)
- Chris Vrij - guitar, grunts (2005-2014)
- Arjen van der Toorn - guitar (2007-2014)
- Joop de Rooij (Aria Flame, Mercy Isle, ex-After the Silence, ex-Transentience, ex-Galanor) - keyboards (2011-2014)
- Menno Bruggeling - bass (2007-2014)
- David de Waal (ex-Intestine, Fayx, ex-Infinite Dawn, ex-Redeemer, ex-Annatar (live), ex-27 Ways to Win) - drums (2005-2012, 2013-2014)
- Walter Romberg (ex-Slander, Fayx, ex-Fenris, ex-Infinite Dawn) - keyboards (2005-2008, 2008-2011)
- David Gutierrez Rojas (Kingfisher Sky, ex-Elleanore, ex-Infinite Dawn) - keyboards (2008)
- Nienke Verboom (Mindshade) - live vocals (2013)
