= BDSAT =

Czech technology demonstration satellite

BDSAT, BDSAT-2
- Operator: CEITEC
- COSPAR ID: BDSAT: 2022-033U; BDSAT-2: 2023-001CT
- Website: www.bdsat.cz

Spacecraft properties
- Spacecraft type: 2x 1U CubeSat
- Manufacturer: Spacemanic

Start of mission
- Launch date: BDSAT: 1 April 2022; BDSAT-2: 3 january 2023
- Rocket: Falcon 9

End of mission
- Decay date: BDSAT: 8 March 2024; BDSAT-2: 14 February 2025

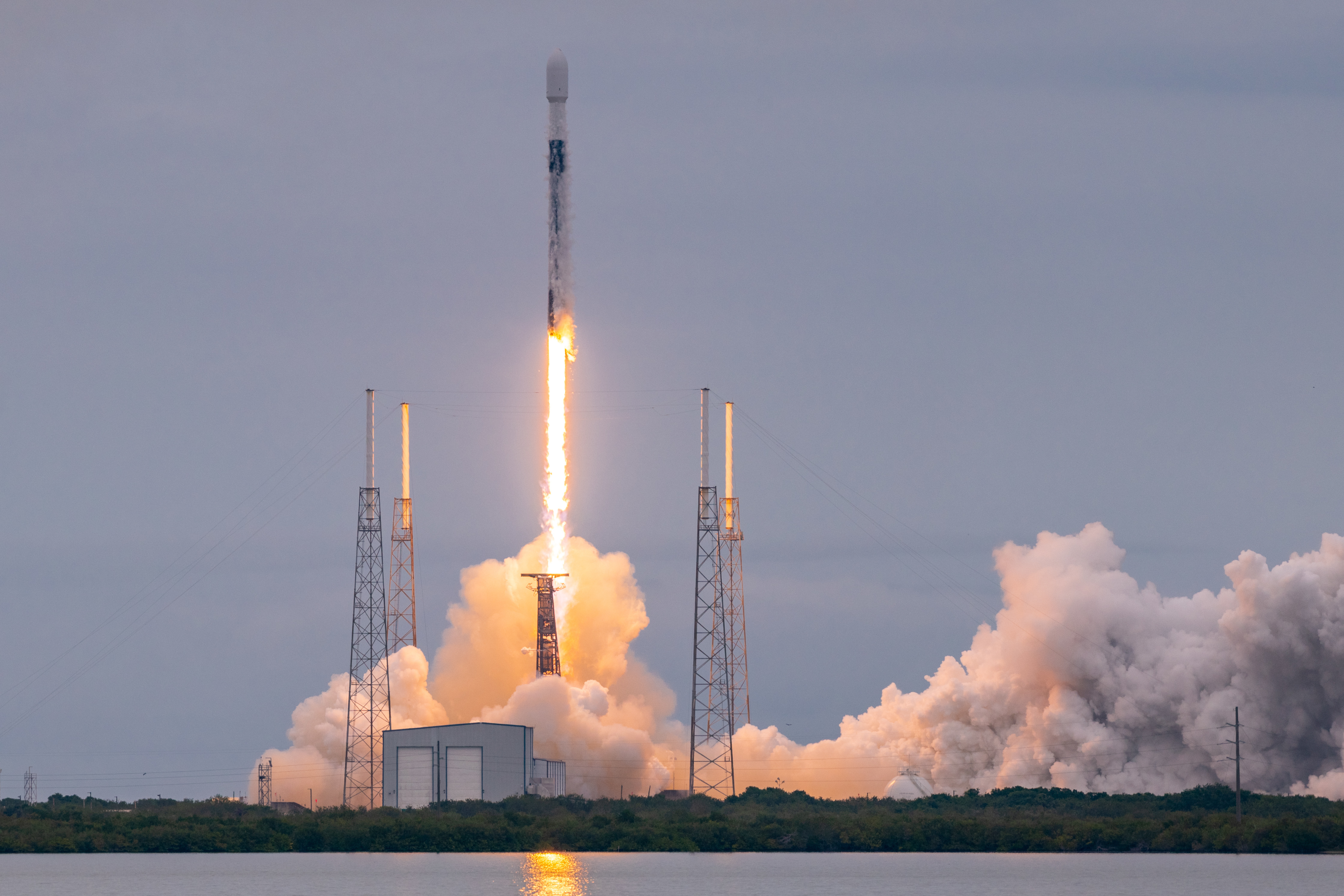
Launch of Transporter-4

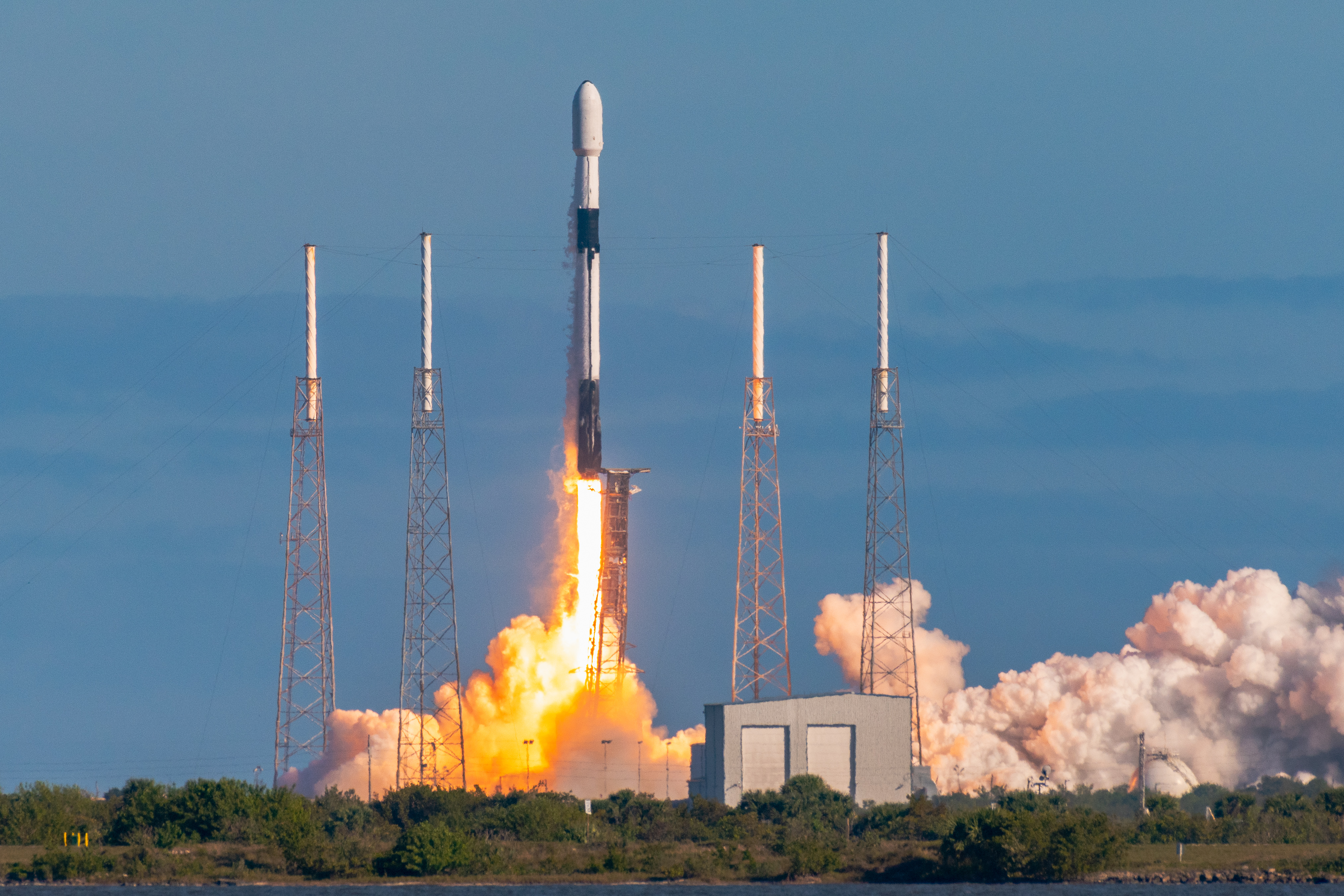
Launch of Transporter-6

BDSAT and BDSAT-2 were two technology demonstration and amateur radio satellites developed by a Czech consortium of the CEITEC institute and the companies BD Sensors and Spacemanic. The goal of the two 1U CubeSat-type satellites was to test pressure sensor devices and supercapacitor energy storage as well as to communicate with the radio amateur community. BDSAT was launched in April 2022 on the Transporter-4 flight of Falcon 9 but stopped transmitting signals after several weeks due to a software problem and burned up in the atmosphere in March 2024. The replacement satellite BDSAT-2 was launched in January 2023 on Transporter-6 and operated successfully. It ended its mission in destructive re-entry in February 2025.
