= Magion satellite series =

Satellites for magnetospheric research

Magion
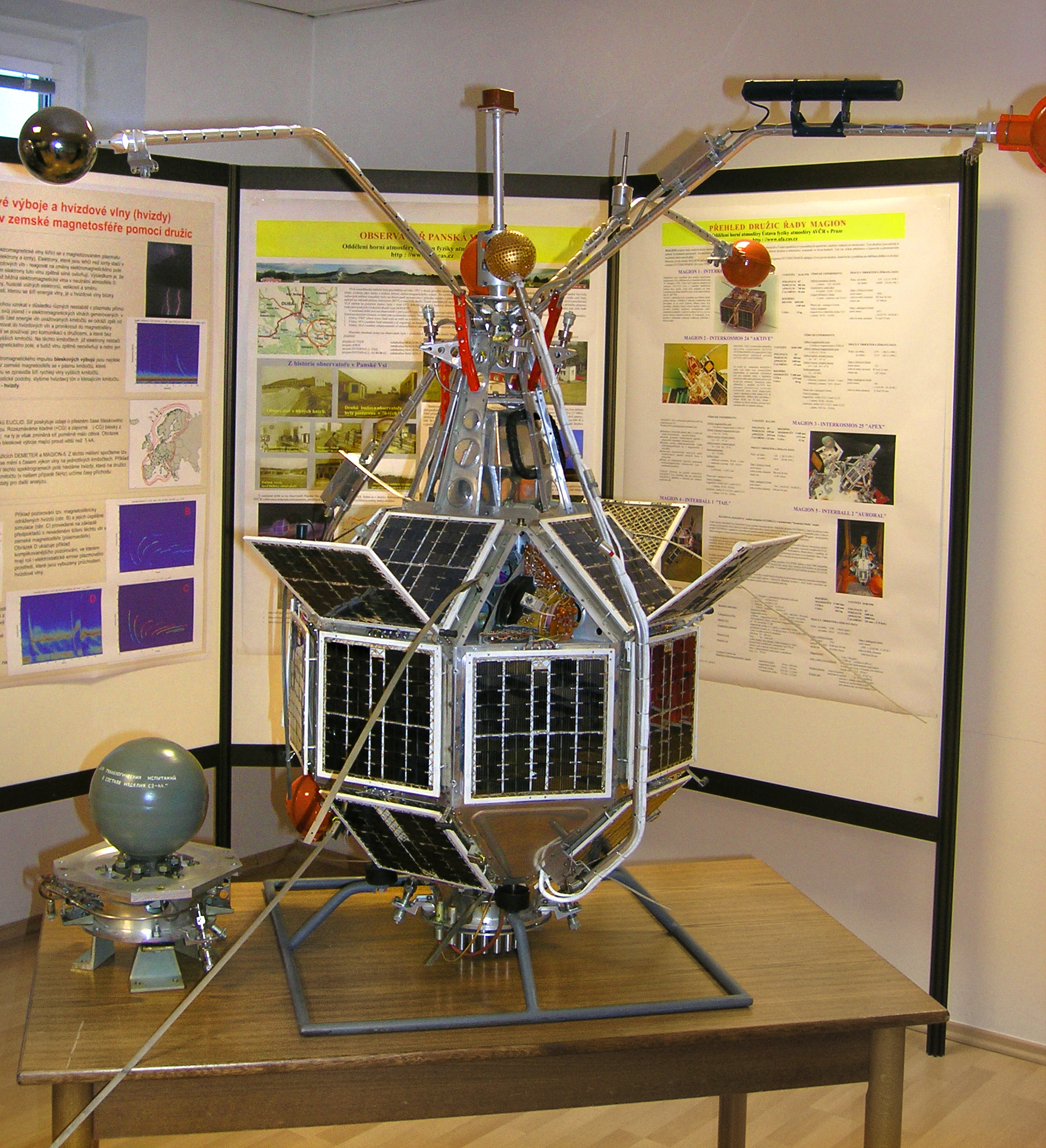
- Model of Magion 2 to 5
- Country of origin: Czechoslovakia, Czech Republic
- Operator: Academy of Sciences of Czechoslovakia

Production
- Launched: 5
- Maiden launch: 24 October 1978
- Last launch: 29 August 1996

Magion (derived from 'magnetosphere' and 'ionosphere') were five satellites for magnetospheric research, launched by Czechoslovakia and later the Czech Republic in cooperation with the Soviet Union and later Russia between 1978 and 1996. They were used for measuring the properties of Earth's magnetic field and the plasma environment around the planet. Each Magion satellite collaborated in a two point system with another satellite launched on the same launch vehicle. Magion 1, 2, and 3 were part of the Interkosmos programme and Magion 4 and 5 were part of the Interball programme. Magion 1 was the first Czechoslovak satellite and Magion 4 was the first Czech satellite. All Magion satellites were launched from the Plesetsk Cosmodrome.

Magion satellites
| Name | COSPAR ID | Launch date | Launch vehicle | Launched with | Orbit |
|---|---|---|---|---|---|
| Magion 1 | 1978-099C | 24 October 1978 | Kosmos-3M | Interkosmos 18 | 406 x 768 km |
| Magion 2 | 1989-080B | 28 September 1989 | Tsyklon-3 | Interkosmos 24 | 500 x 2,500 km |
| Magion 3 | 1991-086E | 18 December 1991 | Tsyklon-3 | Interkosmos 25 | 438 x 3,070 km |
| Magion 4 | 1995-039F | 2 August 1995 | Molniya-M | Interbol 1 | 1,000 x 198,000 km |
| Magion 5 | 1996-050B | 29 August 1996 | Molniya-M | Interbol 2, MuSat 1 (Victor) | 1,000 x 20,000 km |

== See also ==
- List of Czech satellites
