= Slovak Organisation for Space Activities =

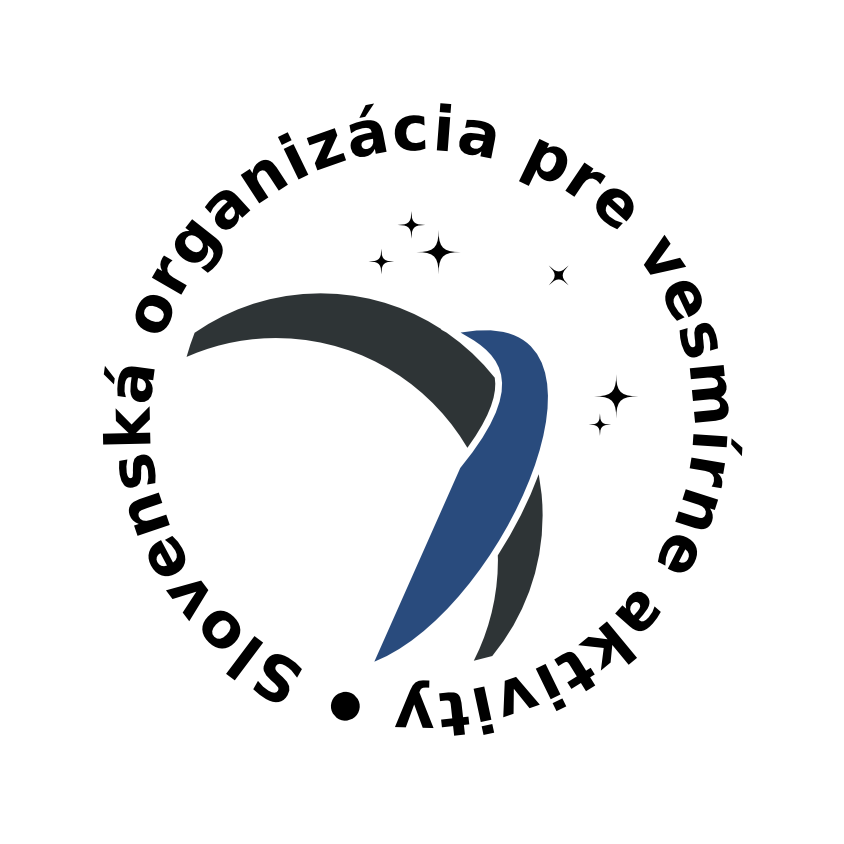
Slovak Organization for Space Activities

Slovak Organization for Space Activities - SOSA (Slovak: 'Slovenská organizácia pre vesmírne aktivity') is non-governmental organization based in Bratislava, Slovakia that promotes space-related research and technologies nationally. The organization supports Slovak activities with the European Space Agency (ESA) and the European Southern Observatory (ESO), developed skCUBE, the first Slovak satellite, and organizes events to promote space-related research and industry.

== Goals ==
SOSA promotes space-related research and technologies within the Slovak Republic. Its members include specialists, professionals and students. SOSA has used meteorological balloons to perform experiments at the edge of space. It organises space-themed educational projects and competitions, and enabled students to work on the development of its first probe skCube.

== Projects ==
=== Stratospheric Balloon - skBalloon ===
SOSA's first project started in 2008, sending meteorological balloons to the stratosphere. The project was named skBalloon. Its goal was to develop a re-usable probe that could be flown to near space, an altitude of 35–40 km, with a payload of technical experiments. The project became a commercial venture in 2013 under the company name GoSpace.

=== First Slovak Satellite - skCUBE ===
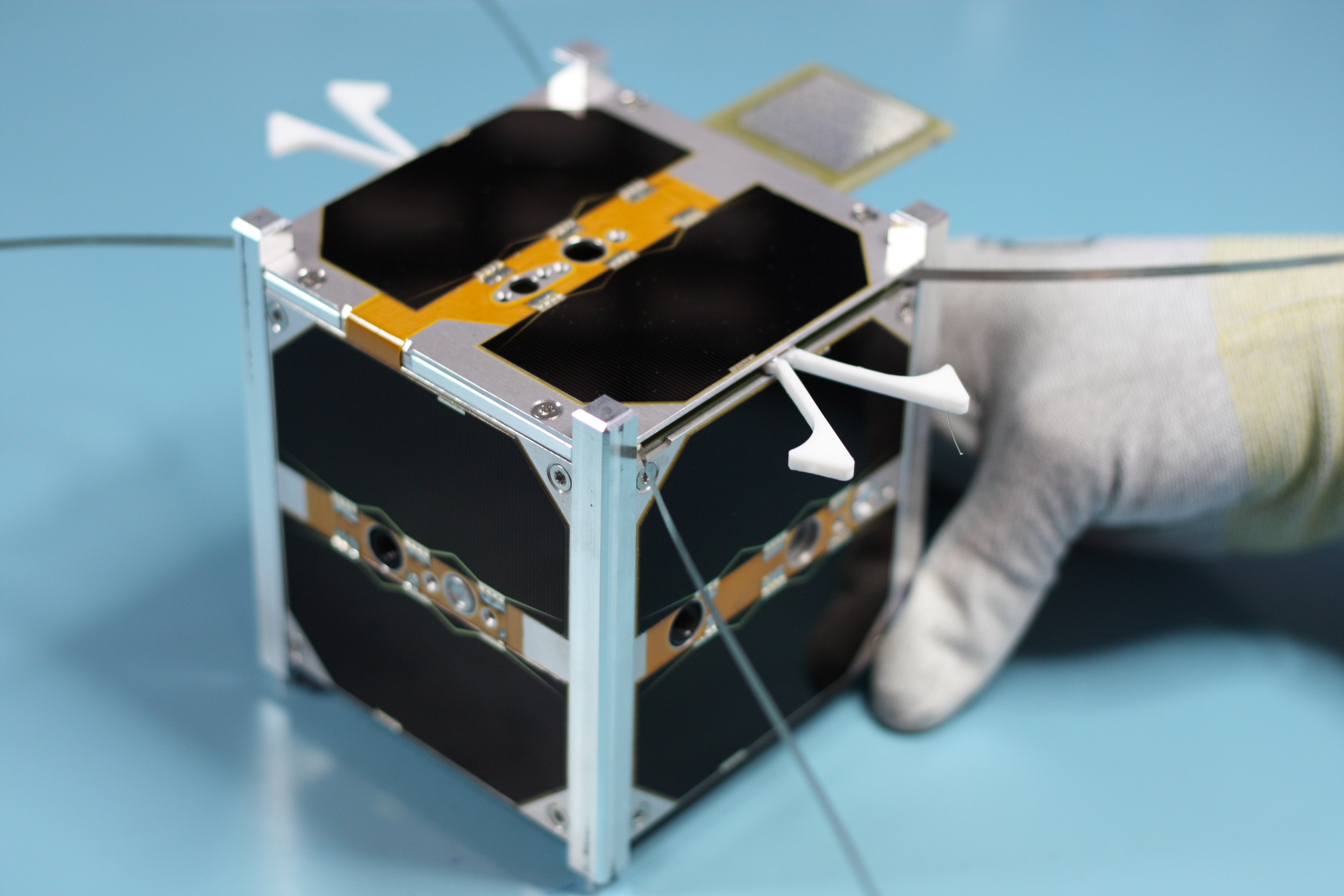
First Slovak satellite skCube

skCube is SOSA's project to design, construct, launch, operate and analyze data from CubeSat 1U. The satellite is 10x10x10cm in size and weighs 1056g. Slovak specialists participated in the development of Magion class satellites in the 1970s and space probes have components built in Slovakia. The goal was to launch a probe which will be designed, constructed and managed from Slovakia, which would be the country's first satellite launched since independence in 1993. The satellite was successfully launched on board a PSLV rocket from Sriharikota, India on June 23, 2017.

== See also ==
- List of Slovak satellites
