= German School Beirut =

Deutsche Internationale Schule Beirut (German International School Beirut)
- Lebanon

Information
- Established: 1954
- Chairman: Omar Salloum
- Slogan: Inspire, Educate, Support
- Website: http://www.dsb.edu.lb/

German International School Beirut (German: Deutsche Internationale Schule Beirut, DSB; Arabic: المدرسة الألمانيّة – بيروت) is a German international school in Lebanon, with campuses in Manara Bliss, Beirut and Khalde Naemeh, Doha. Students who graduate from this school may obtain German diplomas (Sprachdiplom Eins and Sprachdiplom Zwei), International Baccalaureate diplomas or the Lebanese Baccalaureate. All of its operating expenses come from tuition, since the school does not receive any funding from any government.

== History ==
The school opened as a kindergarten in 1954 and got a license for operating a Kindergarten that year from the Lebanese government. It accommodated the German citizens living in Lebanon. It also aimed at integrating the German and Lebanese culture in one school. It was considered a "Begegnungsschule" where the students graduate with the German Abitur and the Lebanese Baccalaureate. It was first located in Jal el Bahr near the Riviera Hotel.

The Lebanese authorities granted licenses for elementary classes in 1955 and secondary classes in 1961. In 1964 the school was relocated to Doha until 1977.

The Doha campus opened in 1966. Due to the Lebanese Civil War, classes were suspended in 1977. Over the period of three years, from 1977 till 1980, the school relocated three times, due to the Civil War in Lebanon. In 1977 the school moved to Besançon, in 1978 to the ACS, and finally to Manara in the year 1980 where it remains till now.

In 1980 classes resumed in a temporary location in Manara, Beirut. However the German teachers, making up 90% of the school's instructional staff, left after kidnappings of German citizens in the city occurred in 1985. In 1985 the German Abitur was no longer offered, and the Lebanese Brevet was the main degree that the students could acquire.The enrollment plummeted to 30 in 1989. War activity destroyed the school's Beirut campus that year. Damages also occurred at the Doha campus, which was renovated in 1995; at that time classes resumed at that campus. In 1995 the Doha branch was reestablished as the main branch of the D.I.S.B. Enrollment recovered, and the school had 1,090 students as of October 2011. In February 2016, the German International School of Beirut received the distinction of "Excellent German School Abroad", awarded by the German Agency for German Schools Abroad, and presented by the Ambassador of Germany in Lebanon Mr. Martin Huth.
