= Magion 1 =

Czechoslovak magnetosphere satellite

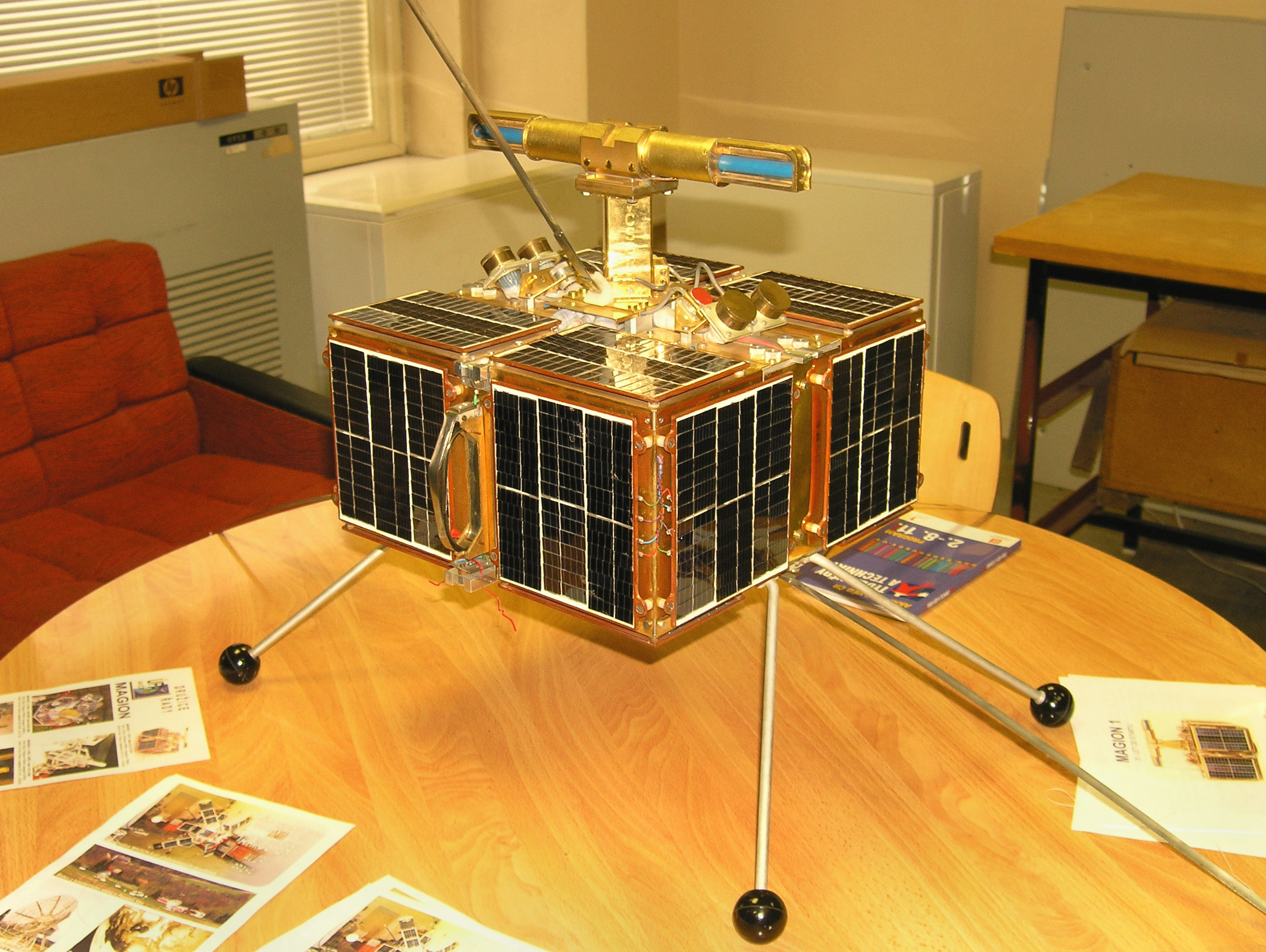
- Mission type: Magnetospheric research
- Operator: Academy of Sciences of Czechoslovakia
- COSPAR ID: 1978-099C
- SATCAT no.: 11110

Spacecraft properties
- Manufacturer: Academy of Sciences of Czechoslovakia

Start of mission
- Launch date: 24 October 1978
- Rocket: Kosmos-3M
- Launch site: Plesetsk Cosmodrome

Orbital parameters
- Reference system: Geocentric
- Regime: Low Earth orbit

Magion 1 was a Czechoslovak scientific satellite launched on 24 October 1978 as part of the Soviet Interkosmos programme. The mission was developed by the Academy of Sciences of Czechoslovakia to investigate plasma and electromagnetic phenomena in the Earth's magnetosphere and ionosphere.

== Mission ==
The satellite carried instruments designed to measure plasma parameters and electromagnetic waves in near-Earth space. Magion 1 separated from its parent spacecraft on 14 November 1978 and operated for several years before atmospheric re-entry on 10 September 1981.

== Legacy ==
Magion 1 was the first spacecraft in the Magion satellite series, followed by additional missions launched between 1989 and the 1990s as part of cooperative space research projects. The asteroid 2696 Magion was named after the satellite in recognition of its contribution to space research.
