= Deutsche Schule Bratislava =

German school in Bratislava, Slovakia

Coordinates: 48.1678°N 17.0979°E

Deutsche Schule Bratislava Slovak: Nemecká škola Bratislava

Information
- Language: German
- Website: https://deutscheschule.sk/de

Deutsche Schule Bratislava (DSB; Slovak: Nemecká škola Bratislava) is a German international school in Bratislava, Slovakia. It serves Kindergarten (kindergarten) and Vorschule (preschool) through Gymnasium. DSB is currently located on Bárdošova 33.
